= Black Canadians in Montreal =

Black Canadians, numbering 198,610, make up 11.3% of Montreal's population, as of 2021, and are the largest visible minority group in the city. The majority of Black Canadians are of Caribbean and of continental African origin, though the population also includes African American immigrants and their descendants (including Black Nova Scotians)

== Demographics ==
List of census subdivisions in the Montreal area with Black populations higher than the national average Source: Canada 2016 Census

- Montréal (10.3%)
- Dollard-des-Ormeaux (6.8%)
- Châteauguay (8.3%)
- Laval (7.8%)
- Pincourt (5.6%)
- Longueuil (7%)
- Côte-Saint-Luc (4.3%)
- Dorval (4.3%)
- Brossard (5.2%)
- Terrebonne (7.2%)

One of the most famous Black-dominated urban neighbourhoods in Montreal is Little Burgundy, regarded as the spiritual home of Canadian jazz due to its association with many of Canada's most influential early jazz musicians. In present-day Montreal, Little Burgundy and the boroughs of Côte-des-Neiges–Notre-Dame-de-Grâce, LaSalle, Pierrefonds-Roxboro, Villeray-Saint-Michel-Parc-Extension and Montréal-Nord have large Black populations, the latter of which has a large Haitian population.

== History ==
The first recorded black person to set foot on land now known as Canada was a free man named Mathieu de Costa. Travelling with navigator Samuel de Champlain, de Costa arrived in Nova Scotia some time between 1603 and 1608 as a translator for the French explorer Pierre Dugua, Sieur de Monts. The first known black person to live in what would become Canada was a slave from Madagascar named Olivier Le Jeune, who may have been of partial Malay ancestry. As a group, black people arrived in Canada in several waves. The first of these came as free persons serving in the French Army and Navy, though some were enslaved or indentured servants.

Marie-Joseph Angélique, a black slave from the Madeira islands who arrived in New France in 1725, was accused of setting the fire that burned down most of Montreal on 10 April 1734, for which she was executed. Angélique confessed under torture to setting fire to the home of her owner, a Mme Francois Poulin de Francheville, as a way of creating a diversion so she could escape as she did not wish to be separated from her lover, a white servant named Claude Thibault. Angélique believed her owner was going to sell her to the owner of a sugar plantation in the West Indies. Whether this confession was genuine or not continues to divide historians.

Joseph, a black slave who spoke French and English, escaped from his owner in Montreal in 1769. Several other black slaves escaped from the area over the following decades.

=== Modern era ===
Many of Canada's railway porters were recruited from the U.S., with many coming from the South, New York City, and Washington, D.C. They settled mainly in the major cities of Montreal, Toronto, Winnipeg and Vancouver, which had major rail connections. In Montreal, they settled primarily in the Little Burgundy neighbourhood. The railroads were considered to have good positions, with steady work and a chance to travel.

To combat poverty and social exclusion, the nascent black community of Little Burgundy founded numerous social organizations: the Women's Coloured Club of Montreal in 1902, the Union United Congregational Church in 1907, and the Negro Community Center in 1927. The neighbourhood became famous for producing several talented jazz musicians. During Prohibition and the later pre-Jean Drapeau years as an 'open city,' Little Burgundy was home to many lively nightclubs featuring homegrown and international performers; one of them was Rockhead's Paradise, owned by Rufus Rockhead, after whom a street is named. Oscar Peterson and Oliver Jones are the two best-known musicians who emerged from the bebop and post-bop era. As the community grew the community began to spread to nearby areas such as, Saint-Henri, Côte-Saint-Paul, Verdun and Ville Emard, often living side by side with poor and working class Francophones, who remained the majority in Le Sud-Ouest, during the early post-war years. While there were few legal barriers to mixed neighbourhoods in Montreal compared to the United States, everyday racism and discrimination limited housing choices by Black Canadians, limiting them to the South west (le Sud-Ouest) well into the 1960s.

In 1968 the Sir George Williams affair occurred as a result of racist policies at Sir George Williams University.

West Indian women, from both the Francophone and Anglophone Caribbean, came to Montreal after the Domestic Immigration Program of 1955 was established. Most settled in Little Burgundy.

Canada maintained its restrictions of immigration until 1962, when racial requirements were eliminated from Canadian immigration laws. This coincided with a wave of decolonization in the Caribbean. Over the next decades, several hundred thousand Afro-Caribbeans came from that region, becoming the predominant black population in Canada. Since then, an increasing number of new immigrants from Africa have been coming to Canada; they have also immigrated to the United States and Europe. This includes large numbers of refugees, but also many skilled and professional workers pursuing better economic conditions. Today's Black Canadians are largely of Caribbean origin, with some of recent African origin, and smaller numbers from the United States, Europe and Latin America.

In 1977, between 1,200 and 2,400 Black Nova Scotians lived in Montreal.Though dispersed throughout the city, many settled among African-Americans and English-speaking West Indians in Little Burgundy. As the black community grew, they began to move out of the Southwest, with the wealthiest families, often well-established railway employees, moving to Notre-Dame-de-Grâce. This trend was exacerbated by post-war urban renewal and construction in the lead up to Expo '67, such as the construction of the Ville Marie expressway, which displaced many residents. Those with the means often relocated to NDG and Côte-des-Neiges, creating a diverse Anglophone community in those respective boroughs, while poorer residents were often scattered in nearby areas. Language politics and discrimination may have contributed to the decline of Little Burgundy and le Sud Ouest, as Quebec nationalists and activists blamed the borough's poverty on discrimination from the wealthy Anglo business community towards Francophones, effectively ignoring the areas' diverse communities and inhabitants, including the robust black community. However, urban renewal policies also affected other groups such as the Irish in Griffintown and Pointe Saint-Charles. Indeed by 1973, the area's population had dropped from 14,710 in 1966 to just 7,000. By 1996, Little Burgundy, once home to 90 percent of the city's Black residents, was now home to only 2 percent of all Black people in Montreal.

=== Diversity ===
Today, Montreal's Black community has diversified considerably, led by the mostly francophone, Haitian community of 120,000 people, the largest in Canada. Haitians now outnumber the longer established Black Anglophone community, with large percentages of Haitians in Montréal-Nord, Saint-Michel, Rosemont and R.D.P. Today, Haitian Creole is the sixth most spoken language in Montreal and the seventh most spoken language in the province of Quebec.

Anglophones traditionally tend to concentrate in the city's western boroughs and historically the South West, while Haitians and other francophones settle in the diverse North eastern boroughs. Smaller groups include Jamaicans, Dominicans, Brazilians, other Caribbeans and students and migrants from mostly French-speaking African countries. Though most of the former have integrated into the larger Black Anglophone community, most black Montrealers are functionally bilingual today. A large number of Montreal's English-speaking Black community still lives in the Cote-des-Neiges and NDG, however the middle class has also moved to La Salle, the West Island and the South Shore.

== Culture ==
Carifiesta (French: Carifête) is an annual Caribbean Carnival held in Montreal. The festival incorporates the diversities that exist among the Canadians of African and Afro-Caribbean descent.

The Montreal Black Film Festival is held annually.

Black Canadians have had a major influence on Canadian music, helping pioneer many genres including Canadian hip hop, Canadian blues, Canadian jazz, R&B, Caribbean music, pop music and classical music. Some of the earliest musical influences include Oliver Jones, Oscar Peterson and Charlie Biddle.

Because the visibility of distinctively Black Canadian cultural output is still a relatively recent phenomenon, academic, critical and sociological analysis of Black Canadian literature, music, television and film tends to focus on the ways in which cultural creators are actively engaging the process of creating a cultural space for themselves which is distinct from both mainstream Canadian culture and African American culture. For example, most of the Black-themed television series which have been produced in Canada to date have been ensemble cast comedy or drama series centred around the creation and/or expansion of a Black-oriented cultural or community institution.

== Institutions ==
- the Negro Community Centre
- Union United Church
- Oscar Peterson Park
- Youth In Motion Community Centre
- Tyndale St. George's Community Centre
- Black Community Resource Centre
- Black Theatre Workshop, Montreal

== Media ==
The Community Contact is a newspaper serving Montreal's Black and Caribbean Community. Black Wealth Matters is a web series addressing issues in the community.

== Notable people ==
- Joel Anthony, retired basketball player
- Samuel Dalembert, retired basketball player
- Dominique Anglade, former leader of the Quebec Liberal Party
- Tyrone Benskin, former member of Parliament for Jeanne-Le Ber
- Chris Boucher, professional basketball player
- Lu Dort, NBA professional basketball player for the Oklahoma City Thunder
- Michaëlle Jean, journalist, broadcaster, and Governor General of Canada
- Georges Laraque, retired hockey player, politician, entrepreneur
- Oliver Jones, jazz pianist and composer
- Kaytranada, electronic music producer
- Khem Birch, basketball player, Toronto Raptors
- Oscar Peterson, jazz pianist and composer
- Benjamin St-Juste, American football player
- Daisy Sweeney, classical music and piano teacher
- Peter Worrell, retired hockey player
- Alexsandra Wright, actress
- Bennedict Mathurin, basketball player, Indiana Pacers
- Olivier-Maxence Prosper, basketball player, Dallas Mavericks

== See also ==
- List of black Canadians
- African diaspora
- African-Canadian Heritage Tour
- List of topics related to the African diaspora
- Slavery in Canada
- Demographics of Canada

== Sources ==
- Benjamin, Drew. The Refugee, or the Narratives of Fugitive Slaves in Canada, Related by Themselves, with an Account of the History and Condition of the Colored Population of Upper Canada. 1856.
- Hill, Daniel G (1992), The Freedom-Seekers, Blacks in Early Canada, Stoddart Publishing Co. Limited, ISBN 0-7737-5558-6
- Burgundy Jazz | Life and Music in Little Burgundy
- David Austen, All Roads Led to Montreal: Black Power, the Caribbean, and the Black Radical Tradition in Canada, The Journal of African American History, Vol. 92, 2007, 517
- Wilton, Katherine (2015), Problems and challenges persist for black Quebecers
