= Montreal Jubilation Gospel Choir =

Canadian choir

- Also known as: MJGC
- Origin: Montreal, Quebec, Canada
- Genre: Gospel music
- Years active: 1982–present
- Label: justin-time.com
- Website: jubilationchoir.com

The Montreal Jubilation Gospel Choir is a choir from Montreal, Quebec, Canada, that sings primarily traditional and contemporary Gospel music. The choir's repertoire also includes Gregorian chant, Bach chorales, oratorios, traditional Zulu music and modern jazz.

== History ==
The choir was founded and directed by Trevor W. Payne in 1982 and gave its first performance at the St. James United Church in Montreal. The choir was founded to commemorate the 75th anniversary of Montreal's oldest black community church, Union United Church up the street from the Atwater Market on the corner of Delisle and Atwater, which borders the St. Henri and Little Burgundy neighborhoods. The two other founding members were the Reverend Frank Gabourel, minister of the Union United Church, and Daisy Peterson Sweeney, the sister of Oscar Peterson, who taught both her brother Oscar Peterson and Oliver Jones to play the piano. The first members primarily came from The Montreal Black Community Youth Choir, which existed between 1974 and 1981 and was also directed by Payne.

In 1983 the choir signed with Justin Time Records, and in 1986 released a recording in with guest singer Salome Bey. In 1993 the MJGC performed in the oratorio Song of Songs by Klaus König. In 1995 their album Jubilation V: Joy to the World won a Juno. They won the outstanding recording artist in 1987 by The Association of Gospel Music Ministries, and in 1989 they were named the best choral ensemble, and also won for best gospel album. In the years 1993 to 1995 they were named vocal group of the year by the Canadian magazine Jazz Report. The choir released a 25-year retrospective album in 2007, Jubilation XI – Looking Back, Vol. 2.

The Montreal Jubilation Gospel Choir has performed at gospel celebrations in Montreal and across Canada, the United States, and Europe.

They have performed with such entertainers as Celine Dion, Ray Charles, New Kids on the Block, Oliver Jones, Martine St. Clair, and Salome Bey. They have performed at many festivals, including the Montreal International Jazz Festival, the Stratford Festival in Ontario, the Harbourfront, Toronto festival and the International Choral Festival. They have recorded a total of eleven CDs, some of which have won Juno Awards.

In 2017 Payne retired as director of the choir.

== Discography ==
=== Montreal Black Community Youth Choir ===
- The Montreal Black Community Youth Choir (RCI 424)
- Goin' Up Yonder (Presqu'ile PE 13501)

=== Montreal Jubilation Gospel Choir ===
- Highway to Heaven (Justin Time JUST 10-2, 1986)
- Jubilation II (Justin Time JUST 21-2, 1988)
- Jubilation III – Glory Train (Justin Time JUST 35, 1990)
- Jubilation IV – A Capella (Justin Time JUST 46-2, 1992)
- Song of Songs (Enja ENJ-7057 2 1993)
- Jubilation V – Joy to the World (Justin Time JUST 54-2, 1994)
- Jubilation VI – Looking Back (Justin Time JUST 66/67-2, 1995)
- Jubilation VII – Hamba Ekhaya – Goin' Home (Justin Time JUST 96-2, 1997)
- Jubilation VIII – A Capella Plus (Justin Time JUST 167-2, 2001)
- Jubilation IX – Goin' Up Yonder (Justin Time JUST-183-2, 2002)
- Jubilation X – I'll Take You There (Justin Time JUST-215-2, 2005)
- Jubilation XI – Looking Back, Vol. 2 (Justin Time JTP 7502-2, 2008)

== Awards ==
Association of Gospel Music Ministries' Golden Note Award

- 1987 Outstanding Recording Artist

Juno Awards

- 1990 nominee, Best Roots and Traditional Album: Jubilation II
- 1991 nominee, Best Roots and Traditional Album: Jubilation III – Glory Train
- 1995 Best Blues/Gospel Album: Jubilation V – Joy to the World
- 2003 nominee, Contemporary Christian/Gospel Album Of The Year: Jubilation VIII – A Capella Plus
