= Little Burgundy =

Area of Montreal in Quebec, Canada

Petite-Bourgogne Petite-Bourgogne
- Neighbourhood
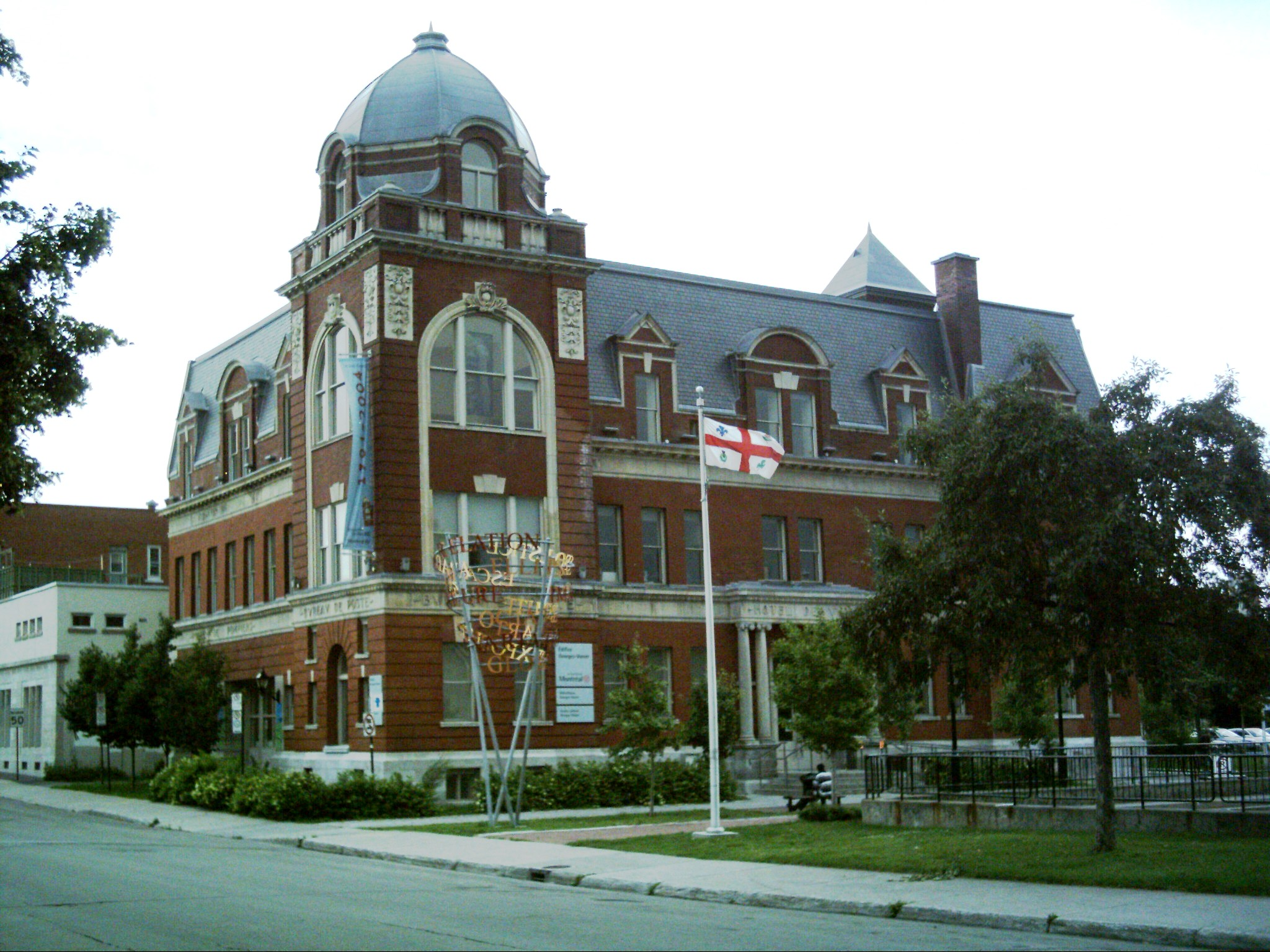
- Edifice Georges Vanier

- Location of Petite-Bourgogne in Montreal
- Coordinates: 45°29′07″N 73°34′33″W
- Country: Canada
- Province: Quebec
- City: Montreal
- Borough: Le Sud-Ouest
- Established: 1864

Population (2011)
  - Total: 10,046
- Postal Code: H3J
- Area codes: 514, 438

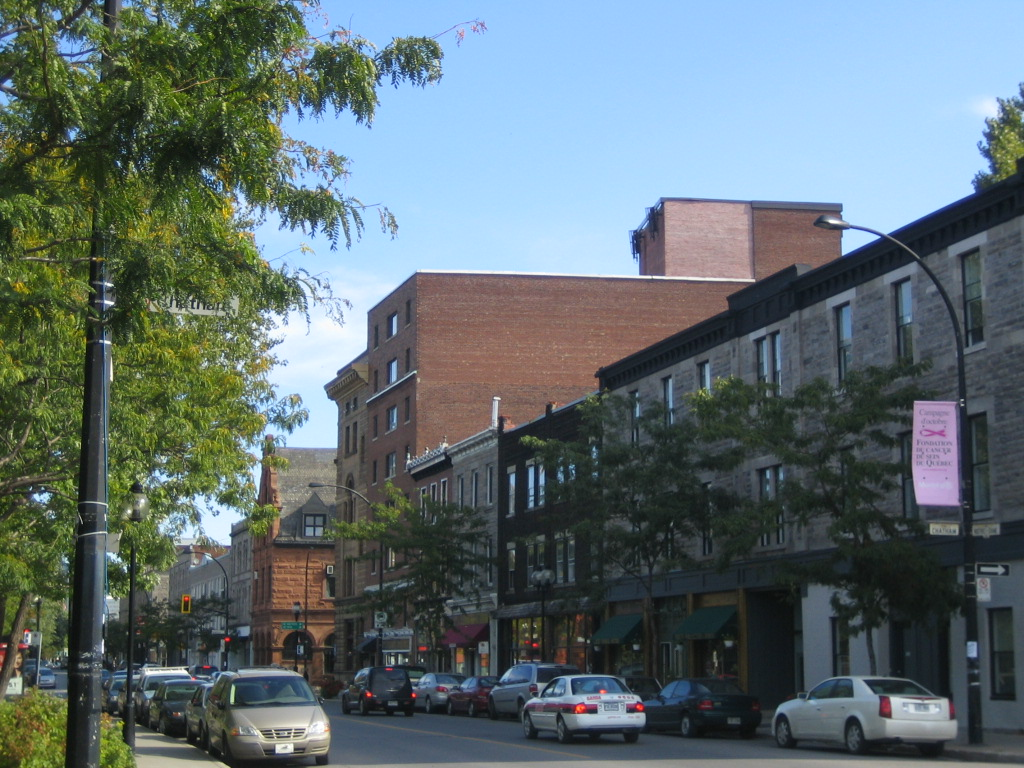
Notre-Dame Street West

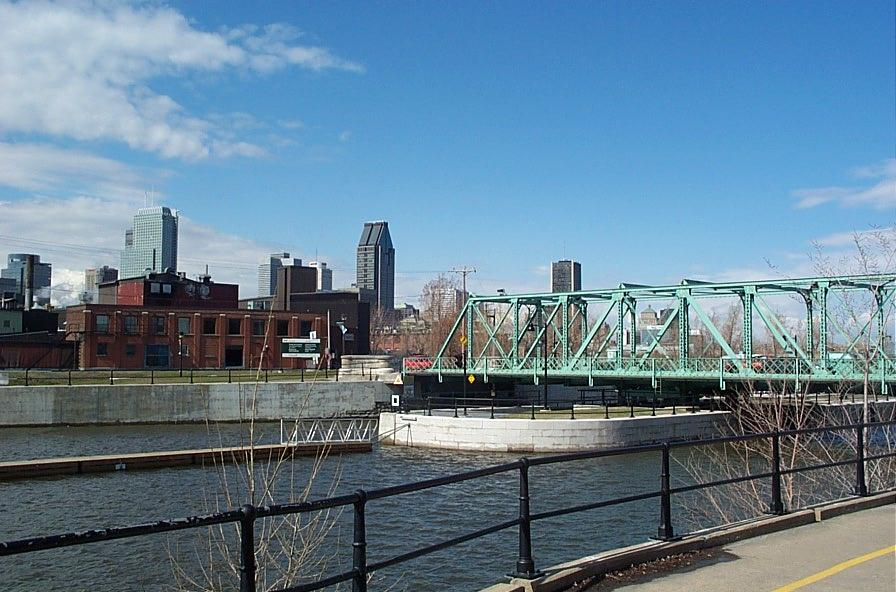
A bridge over the Lachine Canal between Petite-Bourgogne and Pointe Saint-Charles

Little Burgundy (French: Petite-Bourgogne, pronounced [pətit buʁɡɔɲ]) is a neighbourhood in the South West borough of the city of Montreal, Quebec, Canada.

== Geography ==
Its approximate boundaries are Atwater Avenue to the west, Saint-Antoine to the north, Guy Street to the east, and the Lachine Canal to the south.

The adjacent neighbourhoods are the borough of Ville-Marie and downtown Montreal to the north and northeast, Griffintown to the southeast, Pointe-Saint-Charles to the south, and Saint-Henri to the west.

The neighbourhood comprises the former city of Sainte-Cunégonde and Saint-Joseph's ward.

== Origin ==
There are differing accounts of the origin of the name Petite-Bourgogne (Little-Burgundy). A surveyor's map of 1855 identifies a property called Bourgogne, owned by the heirs of the Hon. Louis Guy (brother of Étienne Guy, for whom Guy Street was named). The property corresponds to the areas bounded today by Rue des Seigneurs, Rue Notre-Dame, Rue Saint-Martin, and Rue Saint-Antoine.

Official use of the name "Petite Bourgogne" originates from the 1965 preliminary study for the urban renewal program to refer to the area between the Lachine Canal, the CN railway right of way (now expanded to the Autoroute Ville-Marie), Atwater street and Guy Street in the 1965 preliminary study for the urban renewal program. The report takes inspiration from the writing of Édouard-Zotique Massicotte, archivist of the City of Montreal and resident of Sainte-Cunégonde, who described the area as a meadow known as "la petite Bourgogne." The authors of the urban renewal study "kept this name, full as it is of poetry and nostalgia for another landscape," and this name was retained as the name of the neighbourhood after the renewal program ended.

In the early 1980s, the City of Montreal renamed Petite-Bourgogne to Quartier Georges-Vanier, after the Governor General Georges Vanier, in an attempt to remove the stigma of the low-income area which public officials believed was deterring investment from private developers. During the public consultations for the City of Montreal's Master Plan (Plan d'urbanisme) in 1990, residents requested that the name Petite Bourgogne/Little Burgundy be reinstated.

== History ==
=== Pre-industrial history ===
Essentially agricultural until 1810, today's Little Burgundy began to be built up the ward of St. Joseph, a faubourg spreading outside the city walls. The area around Richmond Square was built up in 1819.

=== Early industrial period ===
Development accelerated in the mid-19th century with the construction of the Lachine Canal attracted many so-called "smokestack" industries, most notably the Grand Trunk Railway yards, and the Steel Company of Canada (or Stelco) plant, among others. A residential sector was built north of the factories between 1857 and 1864. Originally part of the parish of Saint-Henri-des-Tanneries, it was set up as the village of Delisle in 1864, then Sainte-Cunégonde in 1876, becoming a town in 1884. The name derived from St. Cunigunde of Luxembourg, wife of St. Henry II, Holy Roman Emperor, a reference to the neighbouring parish.

The industrial development along the Lachine Canal attracted many prestigious businesses to set up in the Ward of St. Joseph along Rue Notre-Dame, resulting in the construction of many handsome buildings which are the mainstay of today's antiques district.

Sainte-Cunégonde was absorbed into the city of Montreal in 1906; the former town hall is now a public library and community centre, located on Vinet Street. Sainte-Cunégonde was bounded by the Lachine Canal, Atwater Avenue, Dorchester Street (now Boul. René-Lévesque), and a straight line from the corner of Atwater and Tupper streets to the basin of the Lachine Canal just west of the St. Gabriel locks. Saint-Joseph Ward was bordered by that line, St. Antoine Street, Victoria Square, McGill Street, and Notre-Dame Street. At this time, the Grand Trunk Railway ran directly through the area, terminating at St. Bonaventure Station.

=== Deindustrialization and urban renewal ===
Already hurt by the Great Depression before the war, like the rest of the area around Lachine Canal, Little Burgundy was hit hard by the opening of the St. Lawrence Seaway in 1956 and the closure of the canal in 1970. Numerous industries left for the suburbs, leaving the area in a state of decay.

In 1966, the City of Montreal launched a large urban renewal project in Little Burgundy by demolishing countless residential and commercial buildings, replacing them with public housing developments, and revitalizing other parts of the neighbourhood. Also, the part of the neighbourhood north of Rue Saint-Antoine were demolished in 1970 to make room for the Ville-Marie Expressway, a provincial project. Between Little Burgundy and Saint-Henri, 1160 households were evicted for the expressway. The demolitions resulted in a dramatic displacement of the residents.

Between 1968 and 1978, 1441 units of low-income public housing were constructed in Little Burgundy, beginning with Habitations Îlots Saint-Martin (Saint Martin's Blocks). Although Habitations Jeanne-Mance was the first public housing project in Montreal, Îlots Saint-Martin was the first public housing under Quebec's provincial housing authority (Société d'habitation du Québec) and was managed by the municipal housing office (Office municipal d'habitation de Montréal).

In 1991, public housing was 39.3% of all housing in Little Burgundy and nearly 55% of the area's rental housing.

=== Gentrification ===
The city's urban renewal program in Little Burgundy had failed to attract the levels of private development anticipated. Between 1961 and 1971, the proportion of welfare recipients grew dramatically from 10% to 40%. Meanwhile, the area’s population dropped from 14,710 in 1966 to just 7,000 in 1973. The failed renewal scheme displaced up to 70% of the neighbourhood's Black community, particularly affecting business owners and the Black middle-class. As much as a third of the land was vacant by the end of the 1970s. By the 1980s, Little Burgundy became an area of concentrated poverty and was publicly associated with drug use, crime, and youth gangs.

In the 1980s, Little Burgundy became one of the targets of the programs Opération 10,000 and 20,000 Logements (Operation 10,00/20,000 Homes), which aimed to increase property tax revenue by bringing a stable homeowner population back to the city. The Logements programs auctioned lots from the public land bank, much of which had been acquired through the renewal program, to private developers at below-market rates. The land acquired from the removal of the CN railyards in 1982 also figured in the new construction. Between 1980 and 1986, 1179 housing units were constructed through the Logements programs, 233 of which were nonprofit or co-operative housing. Many of the townhouses in Little Burgundy were constructed through the Logements programs, as well as the Foyer Hongrois home for the elderly.

Today, the neighbourhood has endured several phases of gentrification. The sociodemographic profile of the neighbourhood has changed substantially. By 1991, 30% of dwellings were owner occupied. Devertreuil wrote, "Petite Bourgogne saw a 200% increase in administrators and professionals between 1981 and 1986, compared to a 39% increase in St-Henri and a 16% increase in Côte St-Paul."

The redevelopment of the Lachine Canal into a linear recreational park during the 1980s and 1990s and the conversion of industrial buildings along its shores into condominiums also contributed to the shifting sociodemographic profile of the neighbourhood. Other factors contributing to the gentrification of the neighbourhood include the 2002 reopening of the Lachine Canal to boat traffic, the revitalization of the Atwater Market, and, towards its eastern boundary, the continued expansion of Université du Québec's École de Technologie Supérieure and the intense redevelopment of Griffintown.

== Black community ==
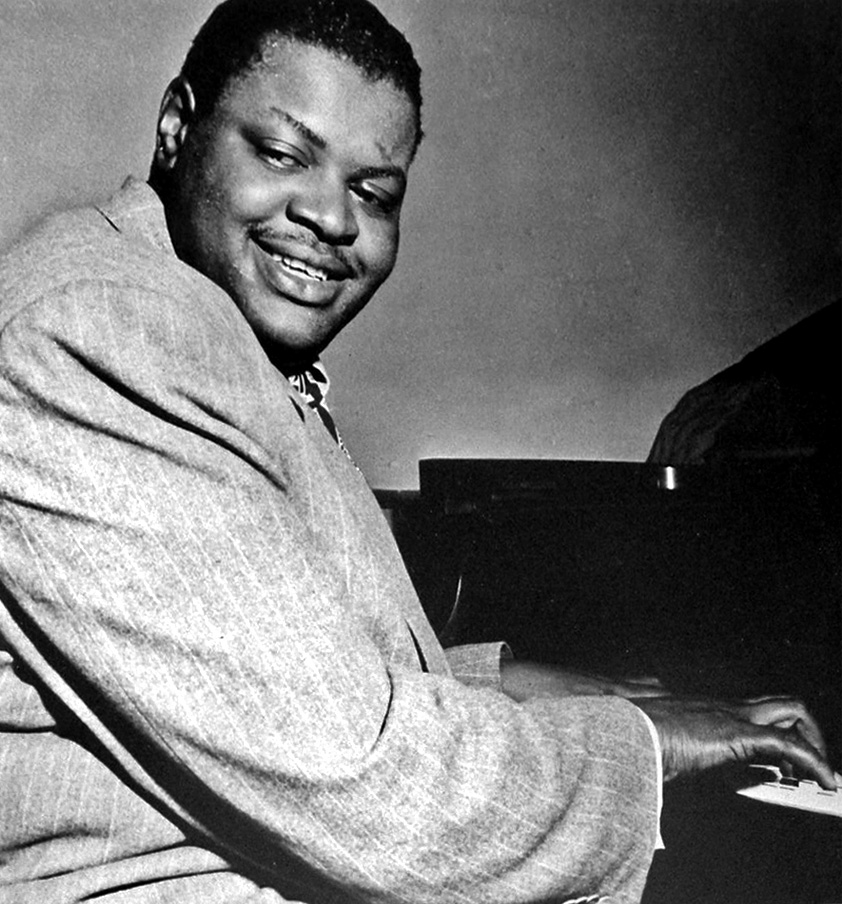
Oscar Peterson, one of the best known Jazz musicians from the neighbourhood.

Starting in 1887, Little Burgundy came to acquire a unique niche as the home of Montreal's working-class English-speaking Black community. Montreal’s emergence as a railway hub in the late nineteenth century led to the migration of hundreds of black workers from the United States, the Caribbean, and the Maritimes. Sainte-Cunégonde, as the area was then known, became home to a great many African-American, Black Canadian and Afro-Caribbean workers due to its location near Montreal's train stations. Many West Indian women, from both the Francophone and Anglophone Caribbean, came to the neighbourhood after the Domestic Immigration Program of 1955 was established.

To combat poverty and social exclusion, the nascent Black community founded numerous social organizations: the Coloured Women’s Club of Montreal in 1902, the Union United Congregational Church in 1907, the UNIA in 1919, the Negro Community Centre in 1927, and the Elk's Victory Lodge in 1941. The parents of American Civil Rights leader Malcolm X met each other in Montreal through their involvement in the UNIA.

The neighbourhood became famous for producing several talented jazz musicians; Oscar Peterson and Oliver Jones are the two best-known. Other jazz artists who had resided in the community were Charlie Biddle and Daisy Sweeney. During Prohibition and the later pre-Jean Drapeau years as an 'open city,' Little Burgundy was home to several nightclubs featuring homegrown and international performers; one of them was Rockhead's Paradise, owned by Rufus Rockhead, after whom a street is named. Other nightclubs that presented live music include the Café Saint-Michel and the Black Bottom.

In Montreal, institutions such as the Negro Community Centre in Little Burgundy played a central role in supporting Black anglophone migrants. The centre was led for many years by executive director Stanley Clyke (of Truro, Nova Scotia), whose work emphasized cultural education and community empowerment.”

Clyke is among many Black Nova Scotians, and Atlantic Canadians more broadly, who settled in Montreal and later played a role in the Community building in Little Burgundy. The neighbourhood, once called Sainte‑Cunégonde, became a hub for Montreal’s Black anglophone community. In the late 19th and early 20th centuries, many Black railway porters from Nova Scotia settled in Little Burgundy due to its proximity to Montreal’s major rail lines and stations."

Large portions of Little Burgundy were demolished in the 1960s for the construction of the Ville‑Marie Expressway and urban renewal projects, displacing much of the neighbourhood’s Black‑Anglophone community.”

Subsequent gentrification further reduced the Black population, which today represents only a small fraction of the neighbourhood’s original diverse residents (many originally from Atlantic Canada).

The decline of passenger train travel in the 1950s and 1960s hit the community hard, as hundreds of men were laid off. At the same time, Black-owned properties were expropriated by the city to build new highways, and many homes were torn down to clear land for a public housing project. Many Black families moved away. Little Burgundy, which was once home to 90 per cent of the city’s Black residents, by 1996 was now home to only 2 per cent of all Blacks in Montreal. In 1996, 21.2% of Little Burgundy residents were Black. By 2016, this number further declined to 15.9%.

By the mid‑1960s, expropriations associated with urban renewal projects left large sections of Little Burgundy vacant, prompting many long‑standing Black families to relocate. According to the Negro Community Centre, new Black neighbourhoods emerged in Côte‑des‑Neiges (Van Horne area), particularly Victoria, and Barclay, and Notre‑Dame‑de‑Grâce (Walkley)."

In 2021, filmmaker Henri Pardo created a film titled Dear Jackie, which focused on the once-thriving Black neighbourhood. The film shares personal stories and interviews from Black residents who have resided in Little Burgundy, through the use of love letters to Jackie Robinson. The film explores the discrimination and racism experienced by the Black community within one of Canada's most integral Black communities.

== Transportation ==
This neighbourhood is served by the Georges-Vanier station on the Montreal Metro. Lionel-Groulx station is also located nearby to the west in Saint-Henri. Major thoroughfares are Atwater Avenue, Georges Vanier Boulevard, Guy Street, Saint Antoine Street, Saint Jacques Street, and Notre Dame Street. The Ville-Marie Expressway bounds the neighbourhood to the north.

== Education ==
The École de technologie supérieure is located in the eastern end of the neighbourhood. Many young Francophone teens from the area attend Polyvalente St-Henri which is located in the adjacent neighbourhood of St-Henri, while the Anglophone teens depending on religion attended James Lyng & Westmount High School.

== Recreation and culture ==
Sporting facilities include the Centre sportif Georges-Vanier, Parc Oscar-Peterson, and Parc Vinet, and the green spaces along the Lachine Canal. A library and cultural centre is located at the corner of Workman and Vinet. Several historic sites and buildings are located in the neighbourhood, including the Lachine Canal Natural Historic Site of Canada and its Pointe-des-Seigneurs archeological site and the Negro Community Centre (NCC). An early Executive Director of the NCC was Stanley Clyke, of Truro, Nova Scotia.

== Commerce ==
The Atwater Market is located at the southwestern corner of the neighbourhood. Little Burgundy is home to the North American arm of Ninja Tune records, many architecture and design offices, new restaurants, as well a longstanding antiques row along Notre-Dame West, formally organized as the "Quartier des Antiquaires".

== Demographics ==
Home language (2006)

Language	Population	Pct (%)
French	3,600	36%
English	3,365	34%
Both English and French	230	2%
Other languages	2,665	27%

== Points of interest ==
- Union United Church

== Notable people ==
- Tyrone Benskin, former member of Parliament for Jeanne-Le Ber
- Réjean Ducharme, reclusive novelist who lived the last 25 years of his life on Quesnel Street.
- Aegidius Fauteux, journalist and historian
- Nate Husser, rapper
- Michaëlle Jean, journalist, broadcaster, and Governor General of Canada
- Oliver Jones, jazz pianist and composer
- Preme, hip hop artist (born in Little Burgundy)
- Oscar Peterson, jazz pianist and composer
- Georges Vanier, soldier, diplomat, and Governor General of Canada (born near the street now named for him)
- Alexsandra Wright, actress

== See also ==
- Saint-Henri
- Le Sud-Ouest
