= Sylvia Sweeney =

Canadian executive television producer and Olympian

- Born: October 3, 1956 (age 70); Montreal, Quebec
- Occupations: Executive television producer, Olympian

Sylvia Sweeney, C.M., (born October 3, 1956) is a Canadian executive television producer and Olympian. In 2017, Sweeney was appointed a Member of the Order of Canada "for her long-standing commitment to and creative leadership at the nexus of art and sport through her documentaries and world-stage productions."

== Early life and education ==
Sweeney was born in Montreal, Quebec, Canada. Sweeney is the daughter of music teacher Daisy Sweeney and railway cook James Sweeney. Sweeney is the niece of jazz musician Oscar Peterson. Sweeney was admitted to the Department of Performance (classical piano) McGill University in 1973. While at university, Sweeney played for the McGill Martlets basketball team. Sweeney also played for the national finalists Concordia Stingers (1977) and the Laurentian University Lady Vees (1978–79) where she won the collegiate championship in 1979. Sweeney also studied communications at Concordia University (1976-1977), French at University of Sherbrooke (1977-1978), philosophy and jurisprudence at Laurentian University (1978–79).

== Basketball ==
Sweeney was on the Canadian basketball team at Montreal 1976, finishing sixth. Eight years later at Los Angeles 1984, she was a member of the team that finished just off the podium, losing to China 63–57 in the bronze medal game, finishing fourth.

Becoming known as “Canada’s First Lady of Basketball”, Sweeney joined the national team in 1974 and spent a decade as a key member including serving as captain from 1979 to 1984. She was voted the Most Valuable Player at the 1979 World Championships in Seoul, won a bronze medal at the 1979 Pan American Games where she was the Canadian team flag bearer, and was a member of the bronze medal-winning team at the 1979 World Student Games in Mexico.

Sweeney was a member of the local organizing committee for the 1994 Men's World Championships in Toronto, director of the Toronto Raptors in the National Basketball Association, and served as the assistant chef de mission for the Canadian team at Atlanta 1996.

Annually, Canadian Interuniversity Sport and TSN present the "Sylvia Sweeney Award" to a Canadian women's university basketball player who best exemplifies the values of athletics, academics and community involvement.

Sportsnet produced a profile about Sweeney for its Black History Month series.

Sweeney was inducted into the Canadian Basketball Hall of Fame in 1994, Canadian Olympic Hall of Fame in 1996 and the Québec Merite Sportif Hall of Fame in 2000.

== Broadcasting and producing ==
In the 1980s Sweeney worked in television, first as a researcher, then as a sportscaster, and finally she became the weekend anchor for CBC Television in Montreal. That same year, Sweeney was hired as a journalist and host for CTV's W-FIVE.

Sweeney subsequently founded her own production company, Elitha Peterson Productions. She has produced award-winning documentary programming for WTSN, W Network, TVOntario History Television and Vision TV. Sweeney co-produced the 1992 documentary In the Key of Oscar that profiled her uncle, Oscar Peterson.

In 1998, Sweeney became a director of the Ontario Media Development Corporation the province of Ontario's Film Commission responsible for issuing film tax credits to filmmakers in Ontario.

In 2002, Sweeney became executive producer in the Ontario division of the National Film Board of Canada.

In 2003, Sweeney was an executive producer on the documentary The Last Round: Chuvalo vs Ali.

In 2004, Sweeney was named the president of International Performing Arts for All (IPAFA), the official supplier of arts and entertainment to the Canadian Paralympic Committee. Sweeney produced the 2004 Paralympic Salute to Canadian Athletes in Athens, Greece.

In 2008, Sweeney was the executive producer of the Marriage of Excellence concert series that was broadcast in Wuhan, China. The concerts showcased Dee Dee Bridgewater, Sheila E, the Oliver Jones Trio, George Sampounidis, Justin Hines, Kitorah, Tony DeBlois, Kat Dyson, Rhonda Smith, Ma Li, Taylor Dayne and others. These were the first concerts ever staged between the Olympic and Paralympic Games to promote the integration of able-bodied artists and artists living with disabilities.

In 2009 Sweeney was the executive producer of Quest for Excellence a documentary that was broadcast on Bravo Television in Canada.

In 2015 Sweeney became a member of the International Olympic Committee's Culture and Olympic Heritage Commission. And in the same year Sweeney launched the ArtsGames Movement.

In 2016 Sweeney was the executive producer of the International ArtsGames Committee's staged global ArtsGames Concert starring Sheila "E" in Rio de Janeiro Brazil, during the 2016 Olympic Games.

In 2020 Sweeney became the Associate Dean of Film, Acting and Media Production at Humber College in Etobicoke, Ontario.

In 2022 Sweeney resumed her Presidency of the International ArtsGames Committee.

== See also ==
- Black Canadians
