= Nelson Symonds =

Canadian jazz guitarist

- Born: Nelson Frederick Symonds; September 24, 1933
- Origin: Upper Hammonds Plains, Nova Scotia, Canada
- Died: October 11, 2008 (aged 75) Montreal, Quebec, Canada
- Genres: Jazz
- Occupation: Guitarist

Nelson Symonds (September 24, 1933 – October 11, 2008) was a Canadian jazz guitarist born in Upper Hammonds Plains, Nova Scotia.

== Biography ==
After pursuing the banjo at a young age, Symonds switched to the guitar. He gained his first performance experience touring on a travelling carnival from 1955 to 1958 throughout the United States. Upon returning to Canada, Symonds settled in Montreal in 1958 and played in the group 'The Stablemates' led by Alfie Wade Jr.

During the 1960s and 1970s Symonds played mainly with bassist Charlie Biddle and drummer Norman Marshall Villeneuve at venues such as The Black Bottom and Rockhead's Paradise. During the 1970s, Symonds and Biddle performed as a duo in numerous Laurentian resorts. Throughout his 30-plus year career, he played at all of the major jazz venues in Montreal including Upstairs, Biddles and Cafe La Bohème among others.

Symonds reportedly resisted recording until the 1990s, cutting three collaborative albums, and one as leader.

Symonds played a Gretsch Sal Salvador model guitar.

Symonds died in Montreal, Quebec due to a heart attack at the age of 75, twelve years after undergoing a quadruple bypass that put an end to his musical career.

== Discography ==
=== As leader ===
- Getting Personal, (Justin Time, 1992)

=== As featured soloist ===
- Bernard Primeau Jazz Ensemble, Reunion (Amplitude, 1990)
- Dave Turner Quartet, Live - Thank You For Your Hospitality (DSM, 1995)
- Dave Turner / Nelson Symonds, The Pulse Brothers (DSM, 1997)

== Filmography ==
Symonds is the subject of two short documentary films by Mary Ellen Davis

- Nelson Symonds Jazz Guitarist, (1984)
- Nelson Symonds Quartet, (1984)

== Awards ==
- 1996: Oscar Peterson Prix De Jazz Award, Montreal Jazz Festival
