= Trevor W. Payne =

Canadian musician (born 1948)

- Born: 21 December 1948 (age 77); Black Rock, Barbados
- Occupations: Musician and composer

Trevor Winston Payne, OC (born 21 December 1948) is a Canadian musician and member of the Order of Canada (1996). He is the founder of the Montreal Black Community Youth Choir, as well as the Montreal Jubilation Gospel Choir.

== Early life ==
Payne was born in Black Rock, Barbados, on 21 December 1948. He sang as a young toddler, and began studying the piano at the age of 8; he later added the saxophone, percussion, cello and keyboards. He and his family moved to Montreal, Quebec and he became a Canadian citizen in 1982. He is fluent in English, French, and German.

== Career ==
In the 1960s, not long after his arrival in Canada, Payne founded Trevor Payne and the Triangle, a group playing soul music and rhythm and blues. The band later became known as Kanda Kanda and performed with the likes of Van Morrison, Jefferson Airplane, the Doors, and other well-known performers of that era.

Feeling constrained by the simplicity of pop music and aware of his lack of musical training, he withdrew from Kanda Kanda and studied music at McGill University in Montreal, where he majored in orchestral conducting. In 1974, together with Daisy Peterson Sweeney, he founded the Montreal Black Community Youth Choir, a 60-member choir which recorded albums for Radio Canada International and the Presqu'ile label.

In 1982, Payne founded the Montreal Jubilation Gospel Choir (MJGC). The choir became popular in the Montreal gospel scene as well as internationally, recording several albums and performing at events for Nelson Mandela and Queen Elizabeth. The choir became known for its eclectic musical style, described by Billboard magazine as "fusing conventional American black gospel music with funk, jazz, and even calypso and classical music". The MJGC also performed with singers such as Salome Bey, Celine Dion, Ranee Lee, and Jackie Richardson, as well as jazz pianist Oliver Jones, who introduced them to Justin Time Records.

Payne also composed, and taught music at John Abbott College in the Montreal suburb of Sainte-Anne-de-Bellevue in the West Island from 1974 until he retired in 2006. In 2017, he retired after 43 years as conductor of the Montreal Jubilation Gospel Choir, although he continued on as artistic director and producer. In April 2019, Payne announced that on doctor's orders he would be stepping down from all involvement with the choir.

== Awards and honours ==
In 1994 he was given the Montreal Black Theatre Workshop's Dr. Martin Luther King Jr. Achievement Award for his promotion of gospel music. In 1996 he was inducted into the Order of Canada. In 2000, he received the Thomas A. Dorsey Award from the Vision Awards in association with the Ottawa Blues Festival for his work and development of gospel music in Canada. He received the Golden Jubilee Medal in the year 2002, and the Diamond Jubilee Medal in 2012.

== See also ==
- List of people from Montreal
- Music of Canada
