= Our Lady Queen of the Universe Church, Barbados =

Coordinates: 13.11592°N 59.61731°W

Our Lady Queen of the Universe Church
- Our Lady Queen of the Universe Church
- Location: Black Rock
- Country: Barbados
- Denomination: Catholic church

The Our Lady Queen of the Universe Church also called "Catholic Church of Our Lady Queen of the Universe" is a temple belonging to the Catholic Church and is located in the town of Black Rock in St. Michael one of the administrative divisions of Barbados, in the Lesser Antilles.

The temple was formally established in 1959, as its name suggests was dedicated to the Virgin Mary in her title of Queen of the Universe, a Catholic belief that Mary is Queen and Lady of all creation, as Mother of God. Follow the Roman or Latin rite and is under the jurisdiction of the Catholic Diocese of Bridgetown (Dioecesis Pontipolitana) based in the capital. All Masses and religious services are offered in English.

== See also ==
- Catholic Church in Barbados
