= Black Rock, Barbados =

Suburb of Bridgetown, Barbados

Black Rock
- Town
- Interactive map of Black Rock
- Parish: Saint Michael

Black Rock is a town in Barbados, now a suburb of the capital city Bridgetown.

== Religion ==
- Our Lady Queen of the Universe Church, Barbados
- Church of Jesus Christ of Latter-day Saints

== Notable people ==
- Trevor W. Payne, musician.
- Kevin Stoute, cricketer.
- Branford Taitt, politician.

== See also ==
- List of cities, towns and villages in Barbados
