= Black Bottom (club) =

Defunct Montreal Jazz club

The Black Bottom was an after-hours jazz club in Montreal that offered live music and soul food. It operated at 1350 Saint-Antoine St. from 1963 to 1967, then moved to 22 Saint-Paul St. from 1968 to c.1977. The Black Bottom was a crucial venue for Montreal jazz nightlife throughout the 1960s and early 1970s, and served as a hangout spot for musicians and jazz fans to meet in the late hours, jam, and enjoy live music.

== History ==
The owner of the Black Bottom was a man named Charles Burke, a local from Little Burgundy who originally opened the club as a side-gig to his job as a railway porter. The first Black Bottom, named after the popular dance from the 1920s, was open Thursdays to Sundays and was no more than a basement room with a kitchen attached. The club served only coffee and was known for its soul food, especially the fried chicken wings.

Located just west of the legendary corner of Mountain and Saint Antoine Streets – home to two other Black-owned nightclubs, Rockhead’s Paradise and Café Saint-Michel – the Black Bottom became a niche after-hours spot in which music would begin around 9 pm and would carry on until the early hours of the morning. It quickly gained a reputation for some of the best, out of few, jazz spots in town, and was popular among beatniks, university students, and local as well as visiting jazz musicians.

Apart from the fried chicken, the Black Bottom’s appeal was largely attributed to its renowned house-guitarist, Nelson Symonds. Symonds’ skill – notably his ability to play chords as fast as lines – attracted the attention of American musicians passing through, like Miles Davis and John Coltrane, and was hailed by Wes Montgomery. The original house trio was composed of Symonds (guitar), Charlie Duncan (drums), and Noble Samuels (bass). Symonds was band leader for the duration of the first Black Bottom on Saint Antoine Street, although members of his combo varied throughout the years, and included Charlie Biddle, Bernard Primeau, Stu Loseby, Fred McHugh, and Norman Marshall Villeneuve.

Burke briefly ran another Black Bottom (“The Black Bottom Room”) at 1194 Peel between 1965 and 1966 which served alcohol and Chinese food. However, the Black Bottom Room never took off and closed after a few months.

In 1967, the Black Bottom on Saint Antoine Street was expropriated to make way for the new Ville-Marie Expressway, a municipal construction project that displaced much of Little Burgundy's majoritarily Black community. By February 1968, Burke relocated the Black Bottom to 22 Saint-Paul Street in Old Montreal. While the second location was larger and had an alcohol license, Burke lamented that it never had the same “funk” as the original. The Black Bottom on St. Paul St. saw a much more “sophisticated”, White, Francophone clientele and became colloquially known as “Le Black”. The club continued to serve soul food and solidified its reputation as a jazz hot spot with headliners like Woody Herman, Miles Davis, and Roland Kirk in the late 60s. Thelonious Monk also played for a six-night stand in 1971.

However, throughout the late 60s and 1970s, the Montreal jazz scene suffered a decline in nightclubs, giving way to more popular genres such as R&B, soul, rock, jazz-rock fusion and disco. The Black Bottom, attempting to keep up with the times, began branching out from strictly jazz and featured artists like Duke Edwards and The Young Ones, The Tony Williams Lifetime, Muddy Waters, Trudy Pitts, and Cane and Able. Even folk and pop musicians like Louise Forestier and Jesse Winchester passed through the club. Nevertheless, by the late 70s, Burke had sold the Black Bottom to Bob di Salvio and Keith Dumouchel, who renamed it La Nuit Magique.
