= Daisy Sweeney =

Canadian music teacher

Daisy Peterson Sweeney
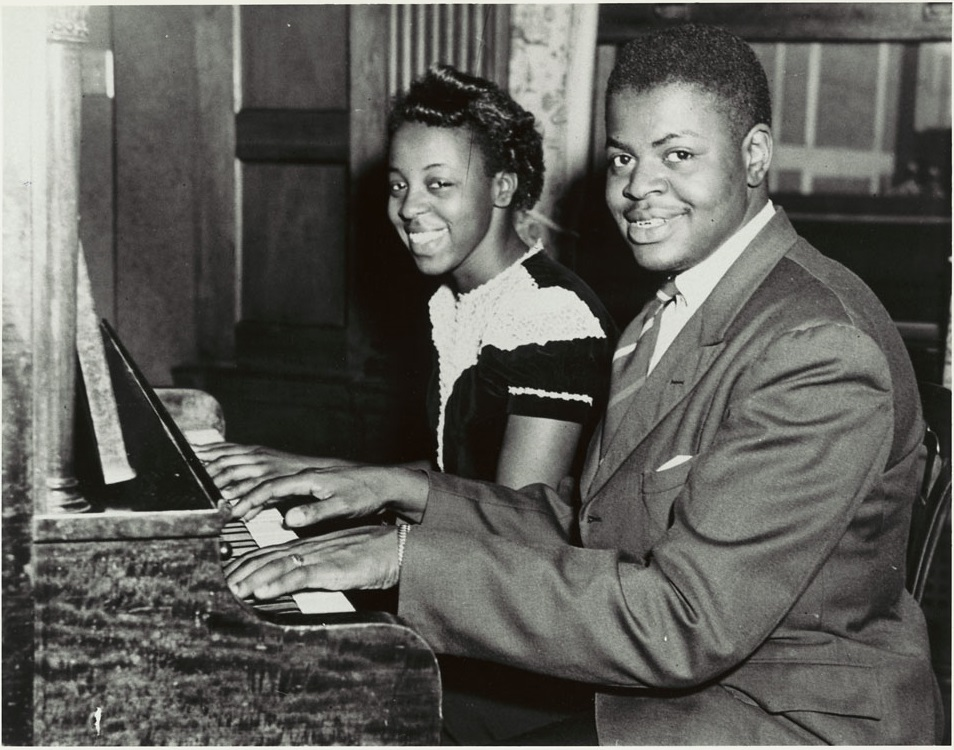
- Oscar Peterson with his sister, Daisy, at the piano, 1944

Background information
- Born: Daisy Elitha Peterson; May 7, 1920; Montreal, Quebec, Canada
- Died: August 11, 2017 (aged 97)
- Genre: Classical
- Occupations: Music and Piano Teacher
- Instrument: Piano

Daisy Elitha Peterson Sweeney (May 7, 1920 – August 11, 2017) was a Canadian classical music and piano teacher, known for having taught many of the most notable figures in Canadian jazz music.

Sweeney was born Daisy Peterson in Montreal in 1920. Her students included Oliver Jones, Ken Skinner, Joe Sealy, Reg Wilson, and her brother, Oscar Peterson. Sweeney would take her students to McGill University for preparatory exams and performances.

Beyond teaching, she also co-founded the Montreal Black Community Youth Choir (now called the Montreal Jubilation Gospel Choir) with Trevor W. Payne in 1974. She was also the mother of Canadian Olympic athlete and television journalist Sylvia Sweeney. Montreal Mayor Denis Coderre tweeted in August 2017 that he intends for the city to name a street after her.

In 2018, Sweeney was honoured with a community mural on a building in Montreal's Little Burgundy neighbourhood. The artist, Kevin Ledo, also painted a mural of Leonard Cohen in the city's Plateau neighbourhood.
