= Rockhead's Paradise =

Night club in Montreal, Canada

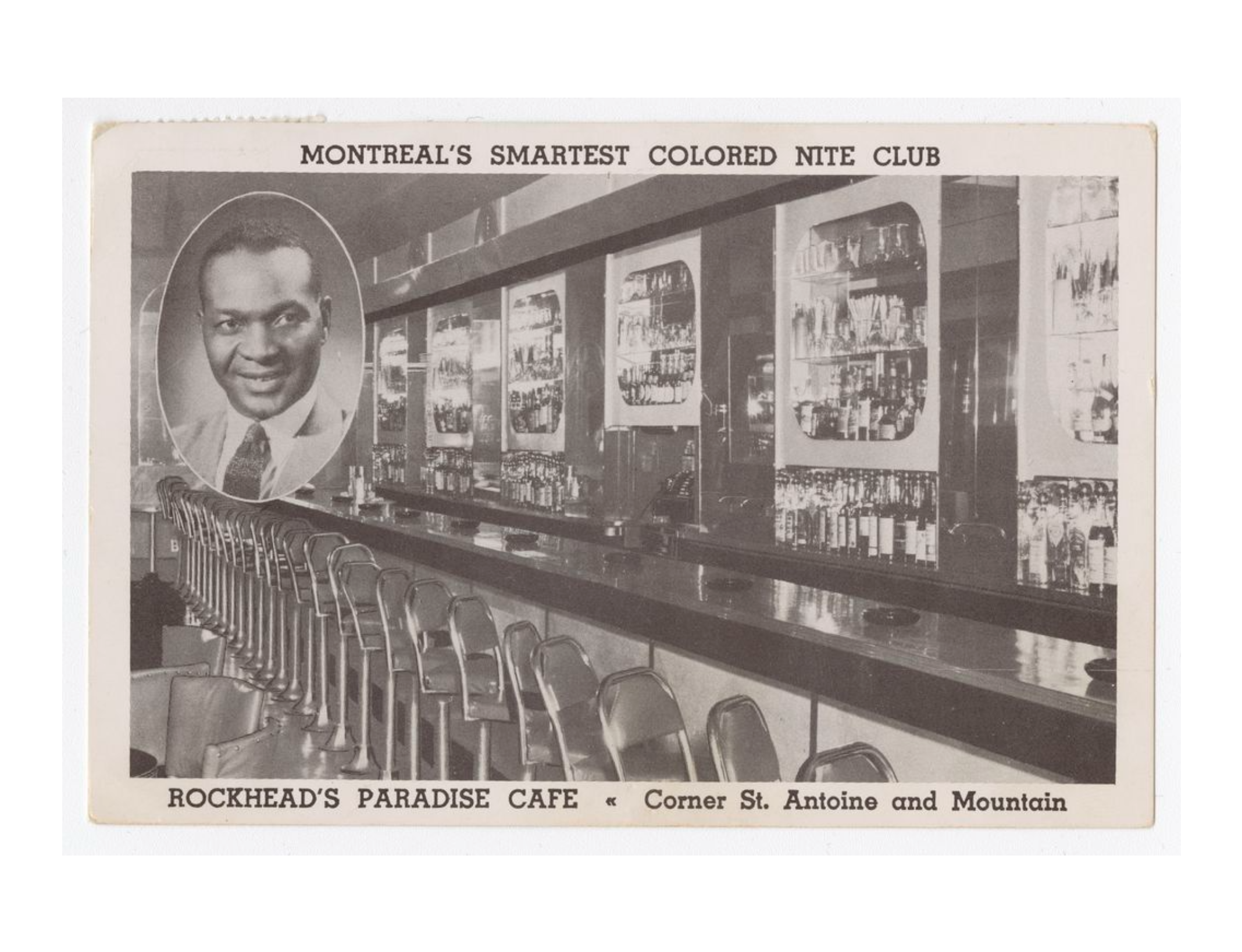
Postcard advertising the club

Rockhead's Paradise was a night club in Montreal, Quebec, the first in the city to be owned by a black businessman. From circa 1931 until its demise in 1977, Rockhead's, as it was known locally, featured singers, dancers, comedians, and other African-American entertainers, mostly brought in from the United States; they were accompanied on stage by a house band of local black musicians. The three-story building also housed a street-level bar where jazz musicians, mostly local, performed, and a tavern.

In 1928, Rufus Nathaniel Rockhead, a Jamaican-born immigrant, First World War veteran, and former railroad porter, bought the building at 1258 St.Antoine Street West, corner of Mountain street. The three-story building initially housed hotel rooms on the top floor. In 1931, Rockhead converted the second and third floors into a cabaret-style night club.

Rufus faced an excessive amount of discrimination as a Black business owner. While segregation laws did not exist in Canada, prejudice was still very much alive. When attempting to obtain his liquor licence, he was rejected his first time. He personally went to the liquor commissioner at the time, who told him 'You know we don't give licenses to coloured people'; despite this, he was still able to procure his licence.

The club became famous for the high quality of its all-black stage shows and the hospitality of its owner, who greeted patrons individually at the top of the stairs. Famous African-American musicians and entertainers, including Duke Ellington, Louis Armstrong, Cab Calloway, Billie Holiday, and Ella Fitzgerald, often frequented the club after finishing their engagements elsewhere in the city, and sometimes performed impromptu on stage with the house band. In the 1940s, the club was known for some of Montreal's first performances by so-called female impersonators, featuring performers such as Dick Montgomery, Malva Bolda, and Billie McAllister.

The club was located in Little Burgundy, a mainly black, inner-city residential neighbourhood where several Canadian jazz musicians grew up, notably Oscar Peterson and Oliver Jones. While the club was popular with both black and white patrons, some white Canadians felt that it “jeopardized white Canadians’ morality and white womanhood in particular,”. Rockhead was also known for encouraging younger local musicians, some of whom became members of the house band and/or played in his street-level bar/ jazz club. He acted as an inspiration and mentor figure to Charles Burke, another local of the neighbourhood, who, in 1963, opened his own jazz club, the Black Bottom, just down the street.

In 1936, Premier Maurice Duplessis, the Premier of Quebec passed the Padlock Law, making the distributionof Communist propaganda illegal and gave permission for authorities to repress any building that was questioned. Rockhead's was under a constant state of surveillance, with guests and workers often witnessing raids pushed by officials.

In 1975 Rockhead suffered a stroke. Two years later his son Kenny Rockhead sold the club to Roué Doudou Boicel, who moved his jazz and blues nightclub The Rising Sun there from its original home on Sainte-Catherine Street West. The move proved unsuccessful, and The Rising Sun subsequently moved back to its original home. The building was later resold and demolished, a victim of gentrification.

Rufus Nathaniel Rockhead died in a Montreal veteran's hospital in 1981.

In 1989, Rufus Nathaniel Rockhead was memorialized by the city of Montreal with a street named in his honor.

In 2012, Montreal pianist Billy Georgette organized “Rockhead’s Last Jam” in honour of the club and its owner. The jam session included Oliver Jones, Norman Marshall Villeneuve, Leroy Mason, Glenn Bradley and Richard Parris.

Rufus Nathaniel Rockhead was designated a National Historic Person by the federal government on January 19, 2024
