= Alexsandra Wright =

Canadian actress

- Born: February 17, 1971 (age 55); Montreal, Quebec, Canada
- Occupation: Actress
- Years active: 1989–2002
- Known for: Television and film appearances
- Notable work: Baby Boy
- Partner(s): Mathew Knowles (2007–2009); Harvey Walden IV (2011–?)
- Children: 1

Alexsandra Wright (born February 17, 1971) is a Canadian former actress. She was previously in a relationship with Mathew Knowles and has one child with him.

== Biography ==
Wright was born on February 17, 1971, in Montreal, Quebec. Wright's acting career began with an uncredited role in the 1989 television movie Third Degree Burn. A decade later, Wright appeared in the JAG episode "Psychic Warrior" and the 2000 drama film Love Beat The Hell Outta Me. In 2001, Wright appeared in Baby Boy, a coming-of-age drama starring Tyrese Gibson, Taraji P. Henson, Snoop Doggy Dog and Omar Gooding. Wright followed her appearance in Baby Boy with two television shows: the "My Fifteen Minutes" episode of Scrubs in 2001, and "The Young and the Meatless" episode of Girls Club in 2002.

Wright eventually retired from acting, and began working as a public relations representative for Microsoft. During her time at the company in 2007, Wright met Mathew Knowles, and the pair began an 18-month affair during which Wright became pregnant. Paternity tests later confirmed that Mathew is the father of her son, Nixon Knowles. On November 11, 2009, Mathew's wife, Tina Knowles, filed for divorce from her husband, citing "discord or conflict of personalities" as the reason. In 2013, Wright publicly apologized to Tina, Beyoncé and Solange for the "pain [she] has contributed" to their lives. After the breakup with Mathew, Wright became engaged to Celebrity Fit Club trainer Harvey Walden IV. In 2014, shortly after the child support payments for Nixon were reduced, Wright and her son moved into temporary housing through a homeless support group.

As of 2023, they now live in a suburb in Los Angeles, and Wright is the CEO of a company called The Global Collective.

== Filmography ==
Year	Title	Role	Notes
1989	Third Degree Burn	Uncredited	Television movie
1999	JAG	Petty Officer Colzie	1 episode: "Psychic Warrior"
2000	Love Beat the Hell Outta Me		
2001	Baby Boy	Woman Inside	
2001	Scrubs	Patricia	1 episode: "My Fifteen Minutes"
2002	Girls Club	Janice	1 episode: "The Young and the Meatless"
