= Oliver Jones (pianist) =

Canadian jazz pianist, organist and composer (1934–2026)

Oliver Jones OC, CQ
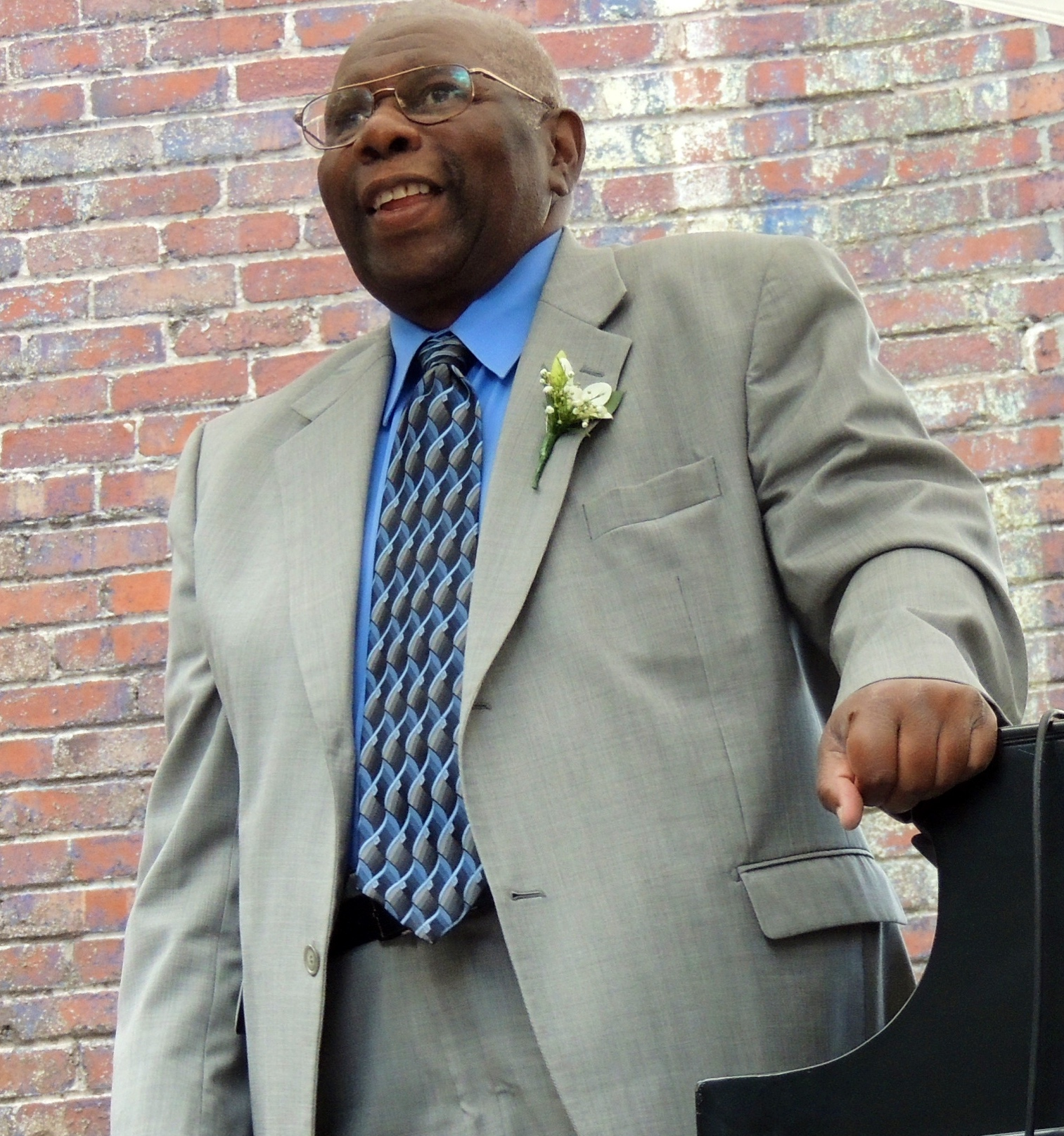
- Jones in 2014

Background information
- Born: Oliver Theophilus Jones; September 11, 1934; Little Burgundy, Montreal, Quebec, Canada
- Died: July 22, 2026 (aged 91) Montreal, Quebec, Canada
- Genre: Jazz
- Occupations: Musician; composer; arranger; educator
- Instrument: Piano
- Years active: 1940–2026

Oliver Theophilus Jones OC CQ (September 11, 1934 – July 22, 2026) was a Canadian jazz pianist, organist, composer and arranger.

In 2023, he was inducted into the Canadian Music Hall of Fame.

== Musical career ==
Oliver Theophilus Jones was born in Little Burgundy, Montreal, Quebec, on September 11, 1934, to Barbadian parents. He began playing piano at the age of five, studying with Mme Bonner in Little Burgundy's Union United Church, made famous by Trevor W. Payne's Montreal Jubilation Gospel Choir. He continued to develop his talent through his studies with Oscar Peterson's sister, Daisy Peterson Sweeney, starting at eight years old. In addition to performing at Union United Church when he was a child, he also performed a solo novelty act at the Café St. Michel as well as other clubs and theatres in the Montreal area. "I had a trick piano act, dancing, doing the splits, playing from underneath the piano, or with a sheet over the keys."

Jones started his early touring in Vermont and Quebec with a band called Bandwagon, and in 1953–63 played mainly in the Montreal area, with tours in Quebec.

From 1964 to 1980, Jones was music director for the Jamaican calypso singer Kenny Hamilton, based out of Puerto Rico.

In late 1980, he teamed up with Montreal's Charlie Biddle, working in and around local clubs and hotel lounges in Montreal. Jones was resident pianist at Charlie Biddle's jazz club, "Biddles", from 1981 to 1986. His first album, Live at Biddles recorded in 1983, was the first record on the Justin Time record label.

By the mid-1980s, he was travelling throughout Canada, appearing at festivals, concerts and clubs, either as a solo artist or with a trio: Skip Bey, Bernard Primeau, and Archie Alleyne. His travels also took him to Europe during this period.

His tour of Nigeria was the subject of a 1990 National Film Board of Canada (NFB) documentary, Oliver Jones in Africa. His music also appears in the NFB animated short film Black Soul. In 1998, Jones wrote, arranged and performed the original score to the documentary film Season of Change (Rightime Productions) about Jackie Robinson's season with the Montreal Royals baseball club in 1946. In 2011, he was one of the big names on the lineup of the P.E.I. Jazz and Blues Festival of Charlottetown. Jones was headliner for the Jazz Sudbury Festival 2013, held in September 6–8, 2013.

== Educator ==
Jones taught music at Laurentian University from 1987 to 1995, and at McGill University from 1988 to 1995.

In 2009, Jones mentored jazz artist Dione Taylor through the Governor General's Performing Arts Award (GGPAA) Mentorship Program. The program pairs a mid-career artist with a past GGPAA recipient; the two artists work together to learn and grow from each other's experiences.

== Death ==
Jones died at a hospital in Montreal on July 22, 2026, at the age of 91.

== Awards and nominations ==
Jones was made Officer of the Order of Canada in 1993.

In 1994, Jones was bestowed the National Order of Quebec, with the rank of Chevalier (Knight).

He received the Governor General's Performing Arts Award in 2005, Canada's highest honour in the performing arts.

In 1986, Jones won a Juno Award for his album titled Lights of Burgundy, and again in 2009 for Second Time Around. He was nominated nine other times, the latest being in 2012, with his album Live in Baden.

Jones was given the Félix Award, in 1989, 1994, 2007 and 2008.

He was voted keyboardist of the year, from the National Jazz Awards in 2006.

Jones received the Oscar Peterson Award in 1990.

In 1999, Jones was awarded the Special Achievement Award at the SOCAN Awards in Toronto.

He was inducted into the Canadian Music Hall of Fame in 2023.

== Discography ==
Year	Title	Label	Notes
1982	Oliver Jones et Charlie Biddle	Radio Canada	With Charlie Biddle on bass. Recorded at the Montreal International Jazz Festival.
1983	Live at Biddle's Jazz & Ribs	Justin Time	Oliver Jones Trio with Charlie Biddle and Bernard Primeau.
1984	The Blues World of Oliver Jones	Justin Time	With Charlie Biddle, Hank Jones, Bernard Primeau, Skip Bey, Ed Thigpen, and Steve Wallace
1984	The Many Moods of Oliver Jones	Justin Time	Solo piano
1985	Lights of Burgundy	Justin Time	With Fraser McPherson (tenor sax), Reg Schwager (guitar), Michel Donato (bass), Jim Hillman (drums)
1985	Festival International de Jazz de Montreal	Justin Time	With Charlie Biddle (bass); live album
1987	Speak Low, Swing Hard	Justin Time	With Skip Beckwith (bass), Jim Hillman (drums)
1986	Requestfully Yours	Justin Time	With Skip Beckwith (bass), Anil Sharma (drums)
1987	Cookin' at Sweet Basil	Justin Time	Trio, with Dave Young (bass), Terry Clarke (drums); live album
1989	Just Friends	Justin Time	With Clark Terry (trumpet), Dave Young (bass), Nasyr Abdul A-Khabyyr (drums)
1990	Northern Summit	Justin Time	Trio, with Herb Ellis (guitar), Red Mitchell (bass)
1990	Live in Baden Switzerland	Justin Time	Trio, with Reggie Johnson (bass), Ed Thigpen (drums); live album; released 2012
1991	A Class Act	Justin Time	Trio, with Steve Wallace (bass), Ed Thigpen (drums)
1993	Just 88	Justin Time	Solo piano
1994	Yuletide Swing	Justin Time	Quartet, with Richard Ring (guitar), Dave Young (bass), Walt Muhammad (drums)
1995	From Lush to Lively	Justin Time	With orchestra conducted by Rick Wilkins
1997	Have Fingers Will Travel	Justin Time	Trio, with Ray Brown (bass), Jeff Hamilton (drums)
1998	Just In Time	Justin Time	Trio, with Dave Young (bass), Norman Marshall Villeneuve (drums); live album
2002	Then & Now	Justin Time	Duo, with Skip Bey (bass)
2005	Just You, Just Me	Justin Time	Co-led with Ranee Lee (vocals); some tracks as duo, some tracks as quartet
2006	One More Time	Justin Time	Some tracks as trio; some tracks with Dave Grott (trombone), Chet Doxas (tenor sax), and Ingrid Jensen
2008	Second Time Around	Justin Time	Trio, with Éric Lagacé (bass), Jim Doxas (drums)
2009	Pleased to Meet You	Justin Time	Co-led with Hank Jones (piano); most tracks as duo; some tracks as quartet, with Brandi Disterheft (bass), Jim Doxas (drums)
2010	A Celebration in Time	Justin Time	With Ranee Lee, Trevor Payne and the Montreal Jubilation Gospel Choir.
2013	Just for My Lady	Justin Time	Some tracks as trio, with Éric Lagacé (bass), Jim Doxas (drums); some tracks as quartet, with Josée Aidans (violin)
