= Union United Church =

Church congregation and building in Canada

Coordinates: 45.4822°N 73.5792°W

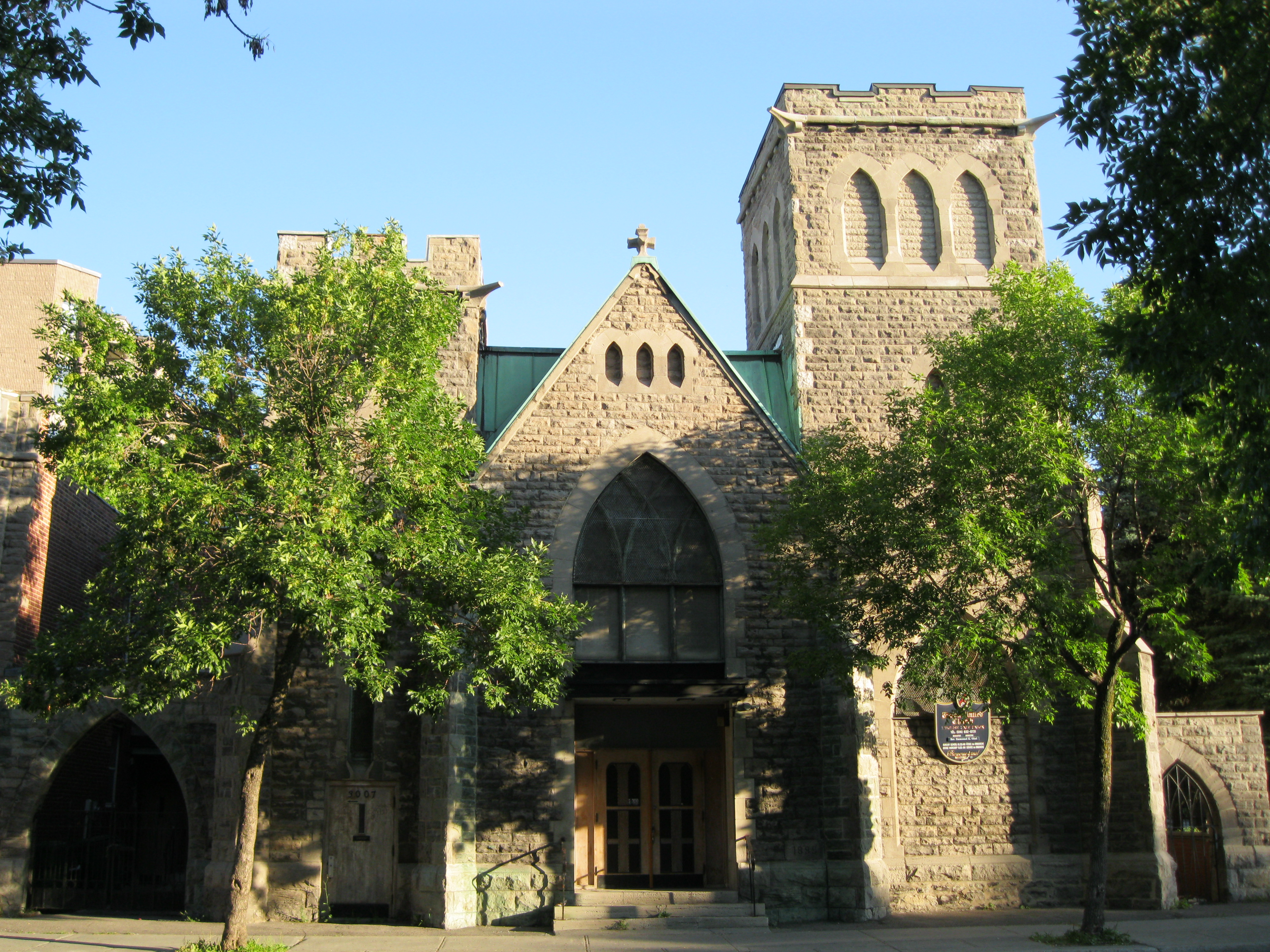

The Union United Church of Montreal is Montreal, Quebec, Canada's oldest black congregation. It was founded in 1907 by several members of Montreal's black community who experienced racial conflict and were banned from entering all-white churches. Union was started with a treasury of just $1.83. The church has gone on to have a long and rich history, and celebrated its 100th anniversary in 2007. It is just one of the many churches that are part of the United Church of Canada. It is believed to be the only church affiliated with the United Church of Canada, however, that worships in the historically black tradition and has a predominantly black congregation.

== History ==
In July 1907, a group of African Canadian railway porters and their wives met to establish a Christian church where they could freely worship in their own style after having been forced non-entry into other churches in Montreal. On September 1, Union Congregational Church was founded on $2 and held its first service with 26 attendees. The first pastor of the congregation was Rev. F.E. Bowser and the church was located at the Welsh Dance Hall, which was owned by the Canadian Pacific Railway (CPR).

Unlike most other black congregations in Canada, the church was founded by black Canadians from the United States as well as the West Indies. In the early years of the church, it was assisted by The Coloured Women's Club of Montreal, the oldest black women's club in Canada. The Coloured Women's Club was founded in 1902 by seven American women whose husbands worked as railway porters; the club was modelled after the National Association of Colored Women's Clubs (NACWC). The names of the founding members were: Mr. and Mrs. W.A. Jackson, Mr. and Mrs. E.F. Taylor, Mr. and Mrs. Charles Allen; Messers David Jones, J. Knight, Donovan, Kelly, and Arthur Ramsay; Mrs. B. Clarke, and Mrs. S. L. Durant.

The church was opened in Welsh Hall on September 1, 1907, by Samuel Brown. Participating were 26 people who made up the first membership roll. The number reflected the country's decennial census, which revealed that there were only 401 people of African descent living in the entire province of Quebec. That was widely regarded as an underestimate, with 1,000 being closer to the real figure. In 1910, Union Church outgrew the Canadian Pacific Railway's Welsh Dance Hall and moved to Olivet Baptist Church on the corner of de la Montagne and de la Gauchetiere (formerly Mountain and Osborne). Union Church moved again in 1916 to the West End French Methodist Church, built in 1897, and located on 3007 and 3021 Delisle Street.

In the years after World War I, the congregation grew because of an increase in railway porters relocating to Montreal from the United States and the West Indies. In 1925, the church joined the United Church of Canada as part of the amalgamation of many Presbyterian, Congregationalist and Methodist churches across the country to form the denomination.

Numerous black organizations met or were founded in the basement of Union United Church, including the Negro Community Centre of Montreal, The Excelsior Debating and Dramatic Club, the Negro Theatre Guild, and the Phyllis Wheatley Art Club.

In 1976, Montreal Mayor Jean Drapeau's Parti Civique announced a plan to expand the metro line by building a new station in Downtown Montreal on Atwater Avenue, directly behind Union United Church. Many feared that the church would be demolished and forced to relocate; as a result, historian Leo W. Bertley wrote Montreal's Oldest Black Congregation to help preserve the history of Union United Church. All proceeds of the sale of the book were donated to the Educational and Scholarship Fund of Union Church or to any other church-related function designated by the official board. In 1978, the new Lionel Groulx station was completed, and its underground structure allowed Union United Church to remain at its location, on 3007 Delisle Street.

Today, the church is pastored by the Rev. Dr. Robert Thompson. The church's membership has increased over the years because of recent immigration from the United States as well as Francophone African and Caribbean countries. Although the congregation has always been predominantly African-Canadian, it has members from 50 different nations.

Over the years, Union United Church has also welcomed high-profile visitors into its sanctuary. Among those are Stokely Carmichael, Rosemary Brown, Sydney Poitier, Dr. Carrie Best, Bishop Desmond Tutu, Bernadette Allen, Thabo Mbeki and Nelson Mandela

== Negro Community Centre of Montreal ==
Under the leadership of Rev. Charles H. Este, Members of Union United Church established the Negro Community Centre of Montreal (NCC) in February 1927 in the basement of Union Church. Founding members of the NCC included Golden Darby, Israel Sealey, Mack McClain, Hattie Olley, Mamie Morris, Edward Taylor, and Clara De Shield. The NCC not only served the congregation of Union Church, but was also open to members of Montreal's black community. One of its major objectives was social integration.

In 1931, Dudley Sykes was hired as the Executive Director of the NCC and under his leadership the NCC programs had an average monthly attendance of 1,000 individuals.

== Pastors ==
- Rev. F.E. Bowser (served from 1902-1909)
- Rev. H.B. Gantt (served 1910-1915)
- Rev. O.B. Thompson (served 1921-1923)
- Rev. Charles H. Este (served 1923-1968)
- Rev. Frank B. Gabourel (served 1968-1980)
- Rev. Leicester Bigby (served 1980-1997)
- Rev. Darryl Gray (served 1998-2005)

== Prominent Church members ==
- Oscar Peterson (1925-2007), Jazz musician
- Oliver Jones (1934-), Jazz musician
- Percy Rodrigues (1918-2007), actor
- Mairuth Sarsfield (1925-2013), bestselling novelist
- Juanita Westmoreland-Traoré (1942-), the first black Honourable Judge appointed in Quebec
- Brenda Paris, politician
- Georgina Browne, activist and grandmother

== Gallery ==
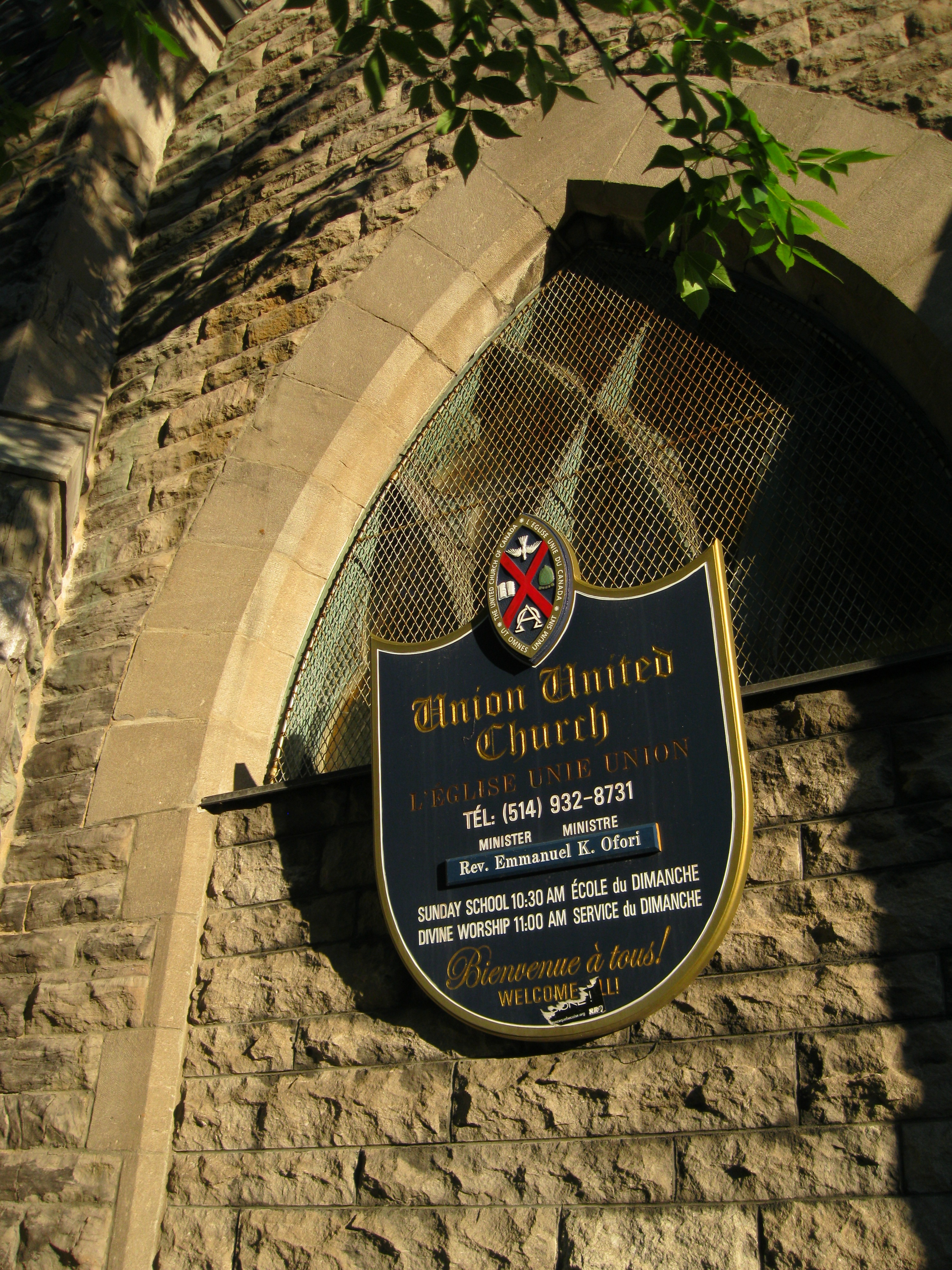

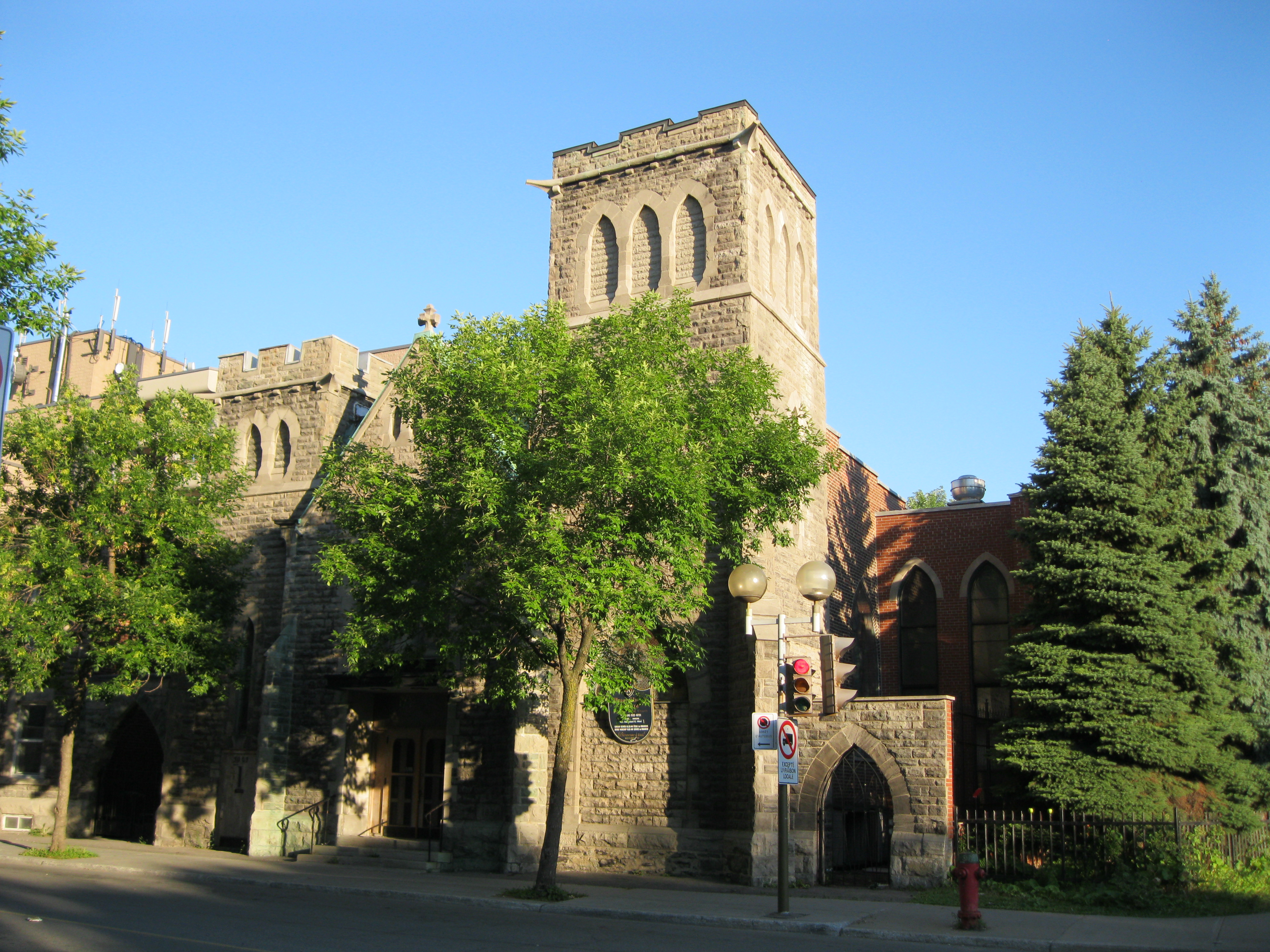

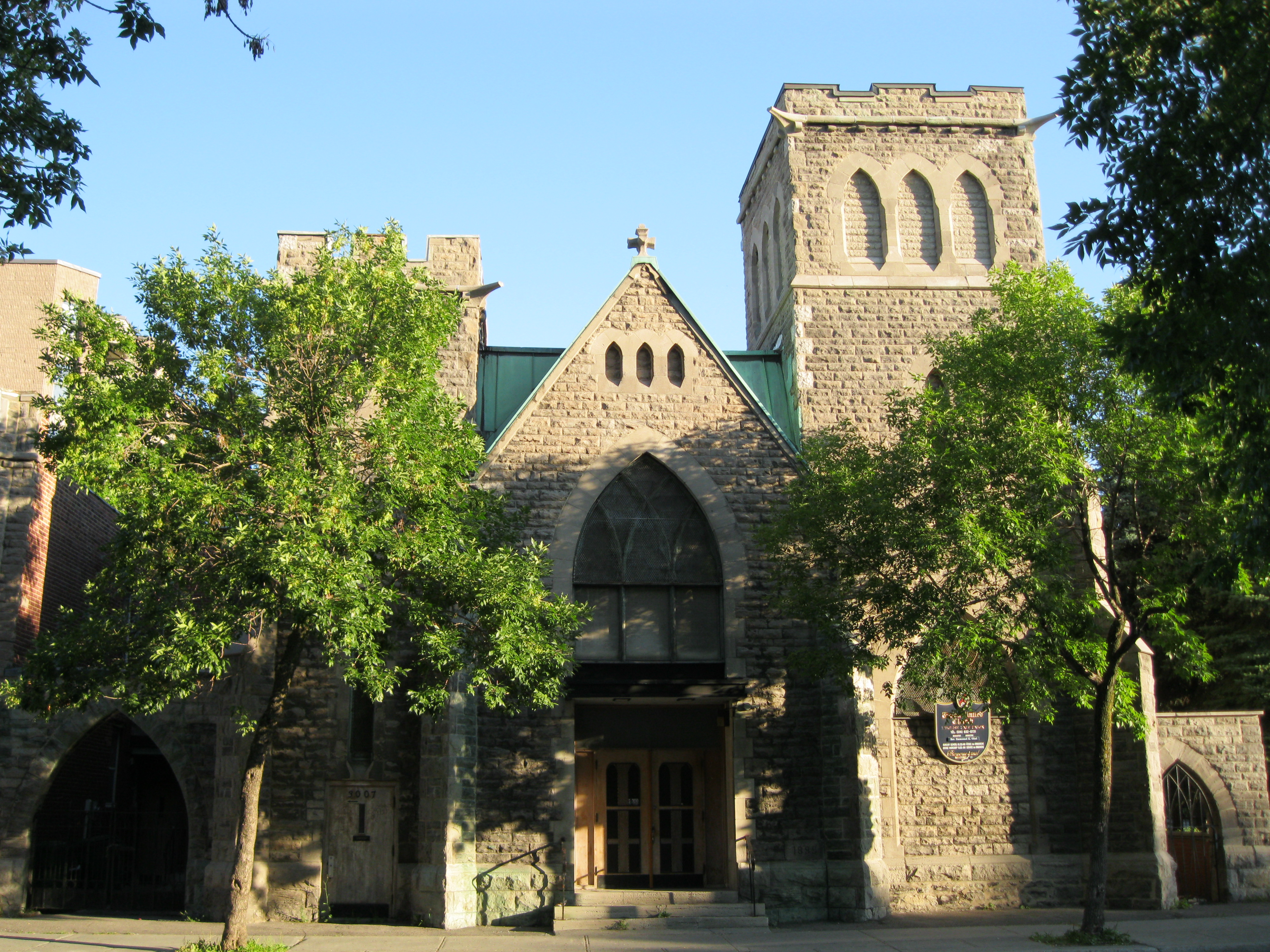

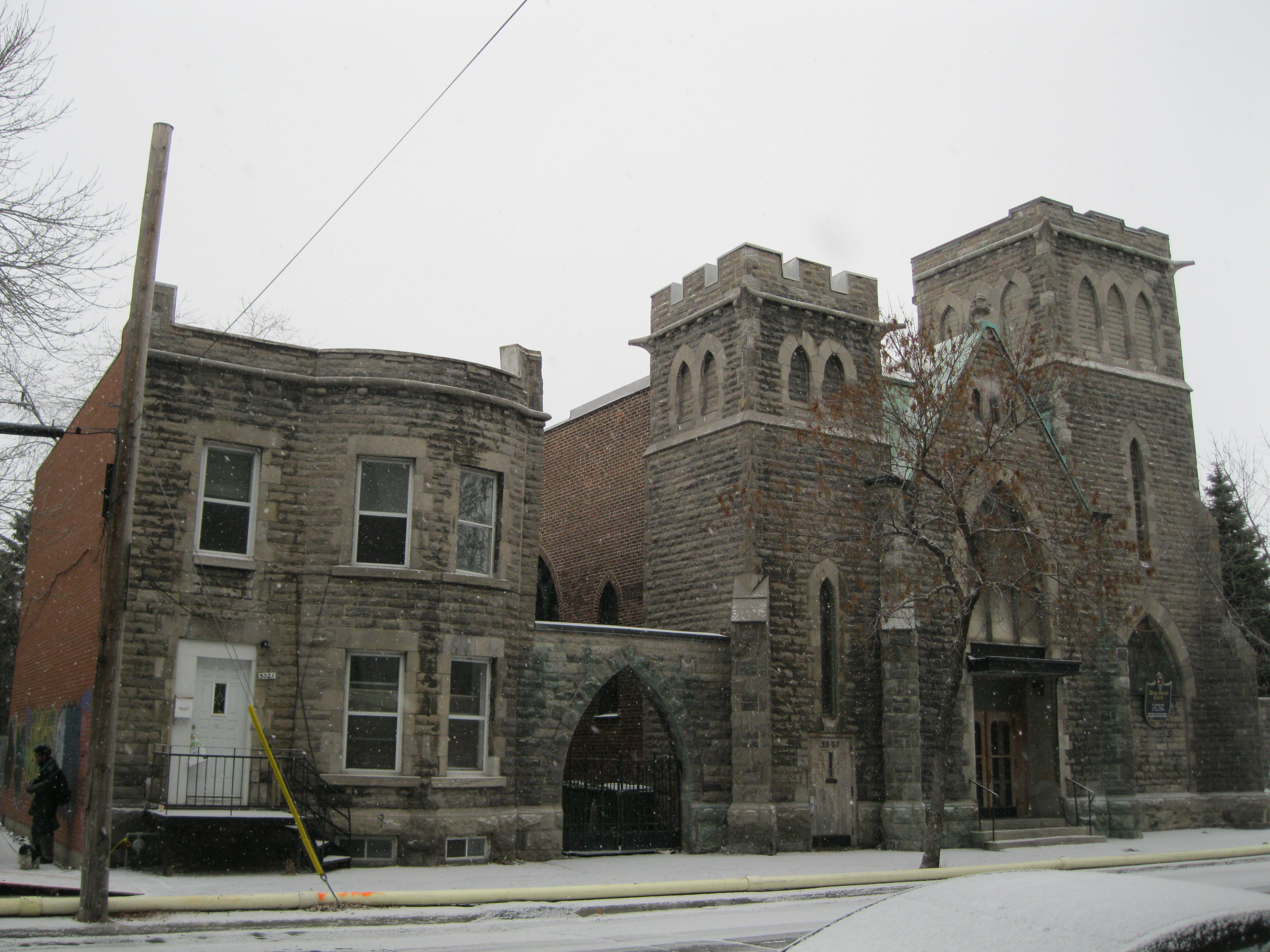

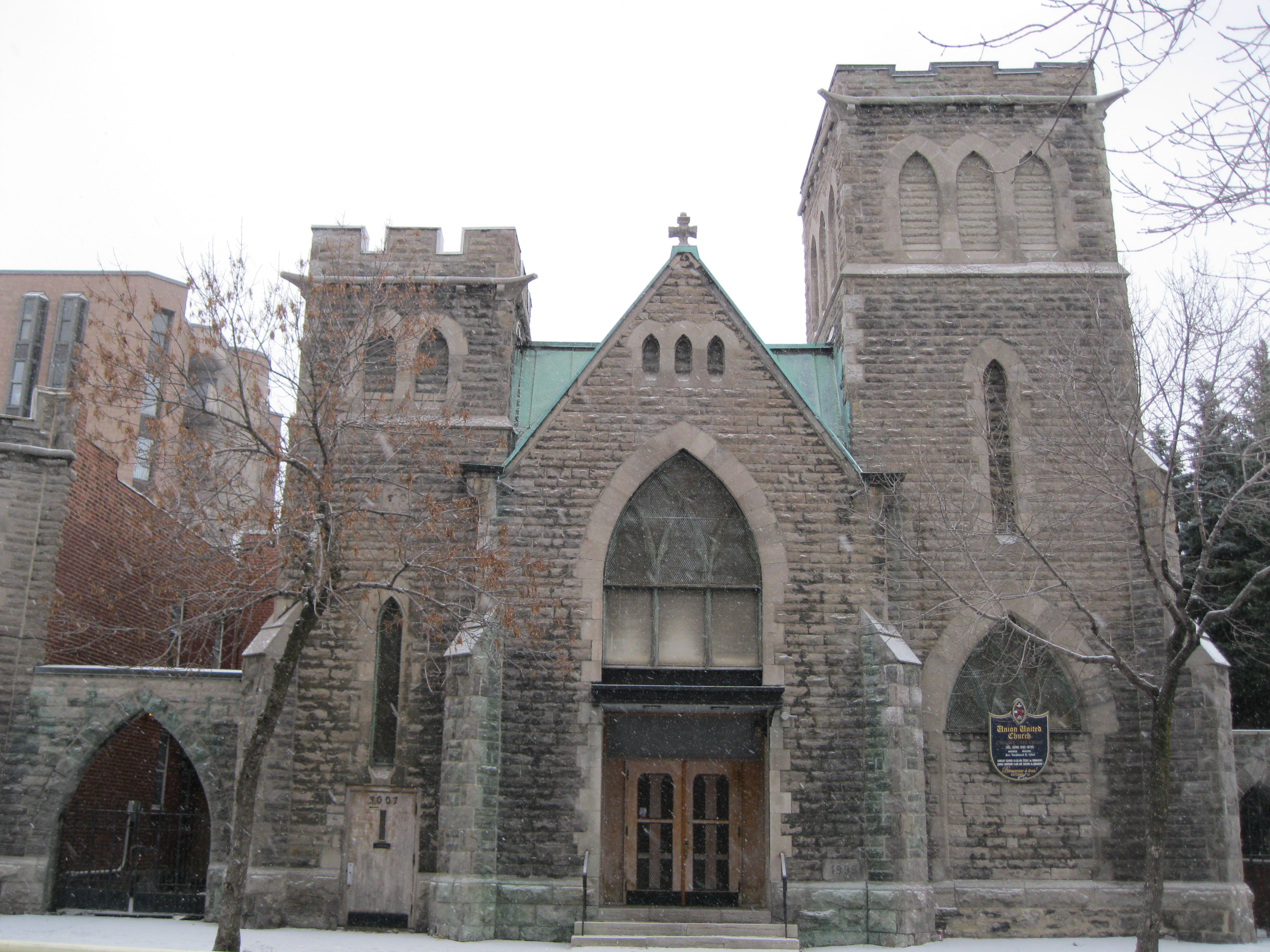

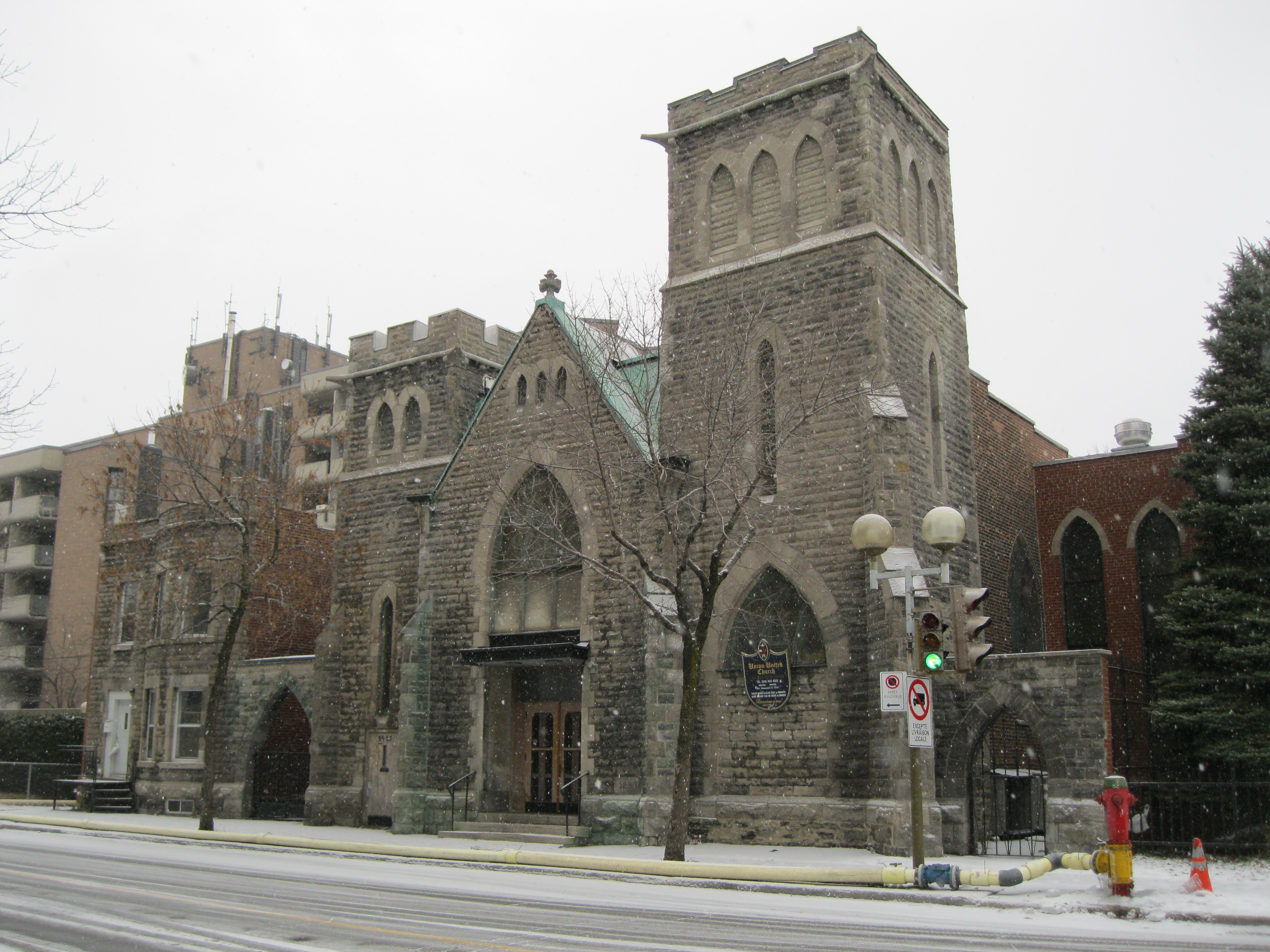

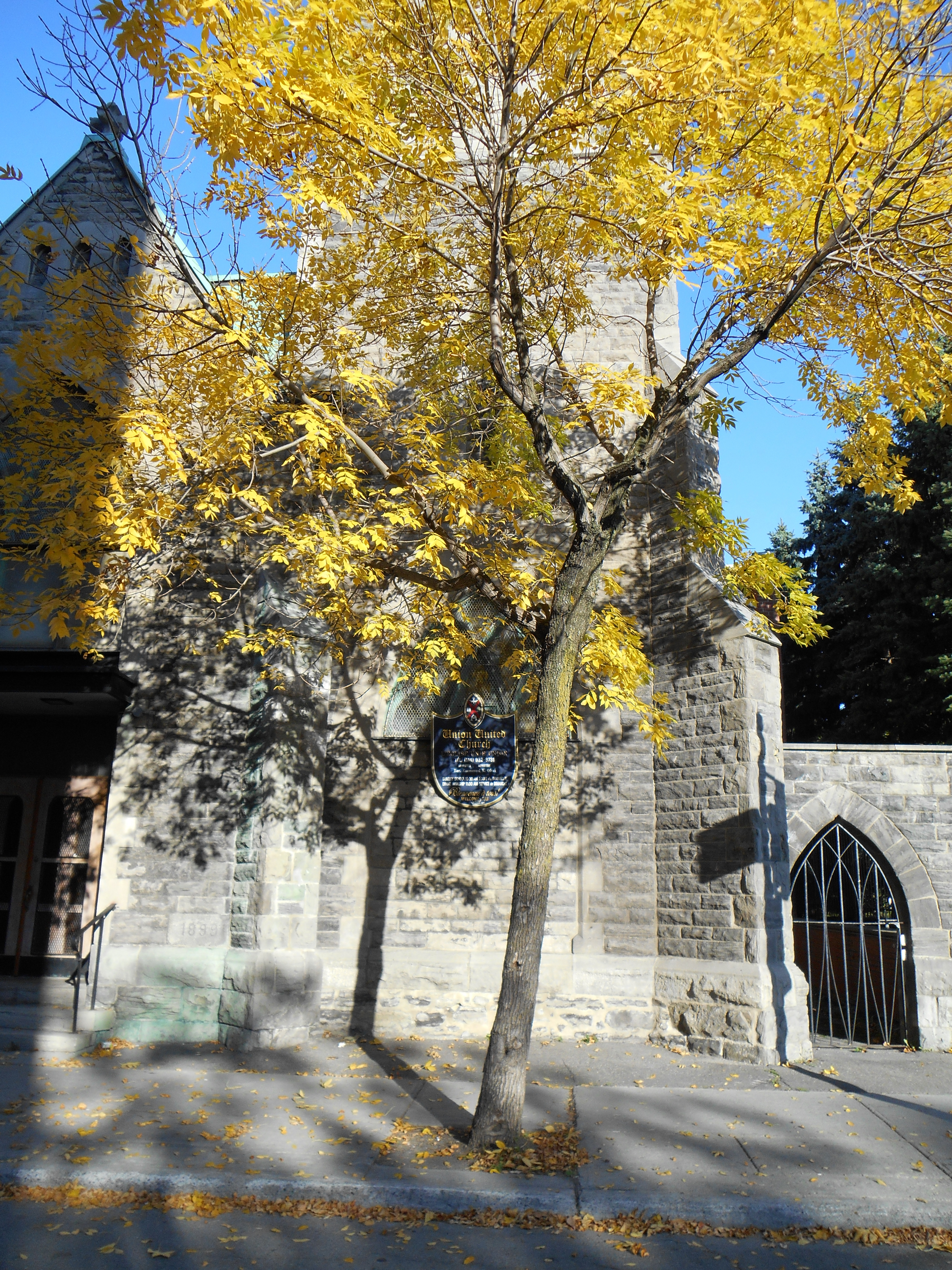

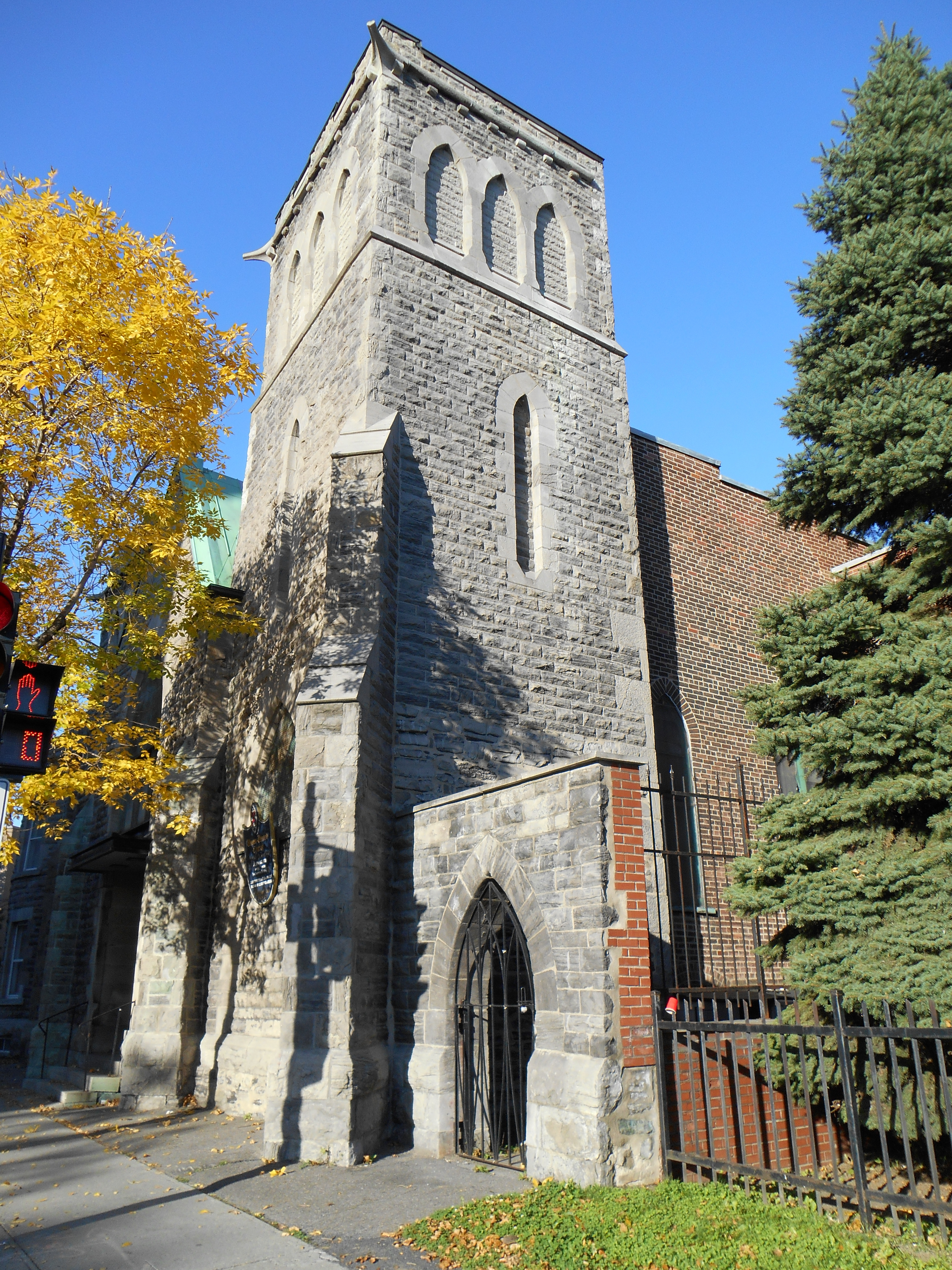

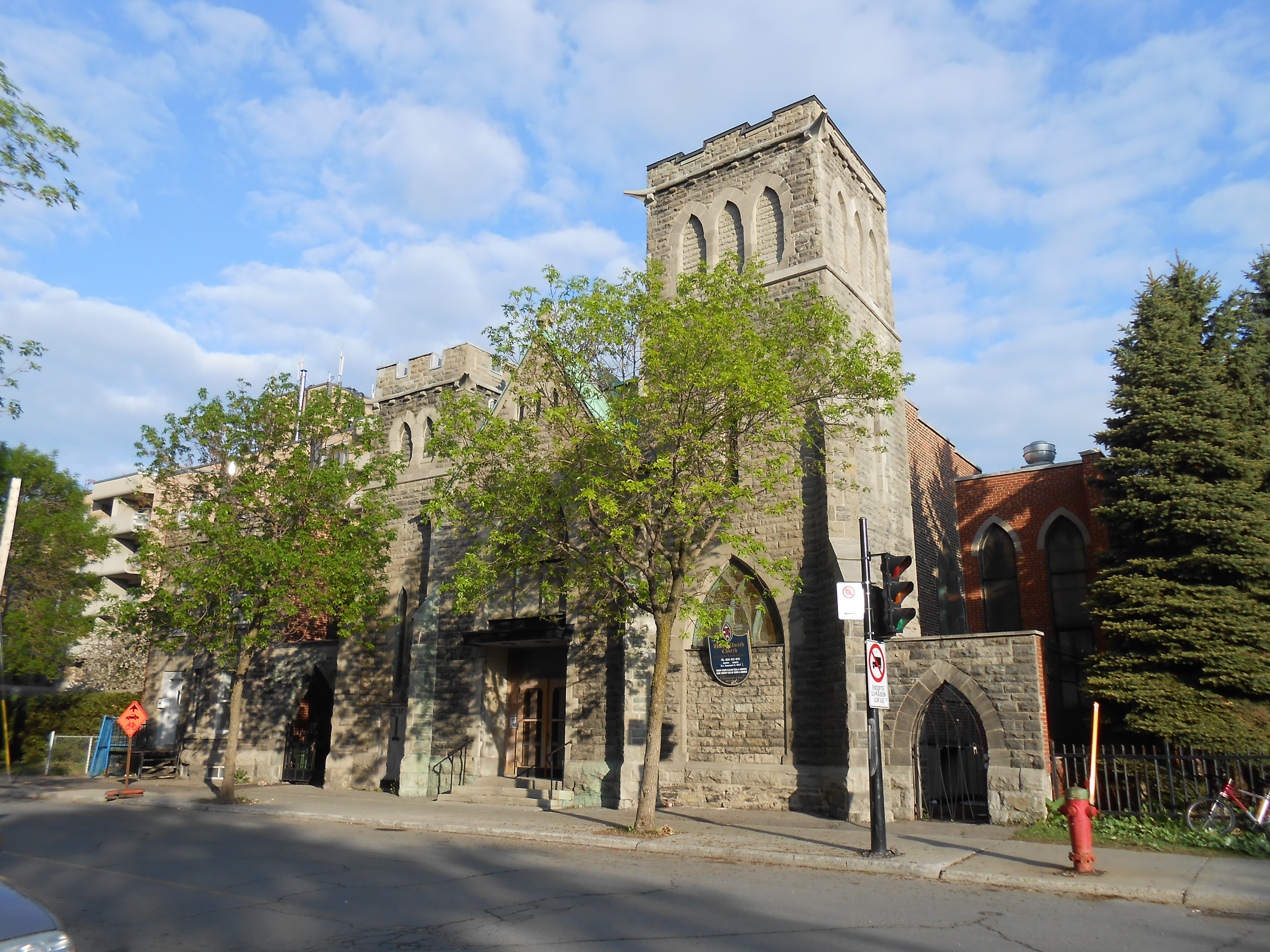

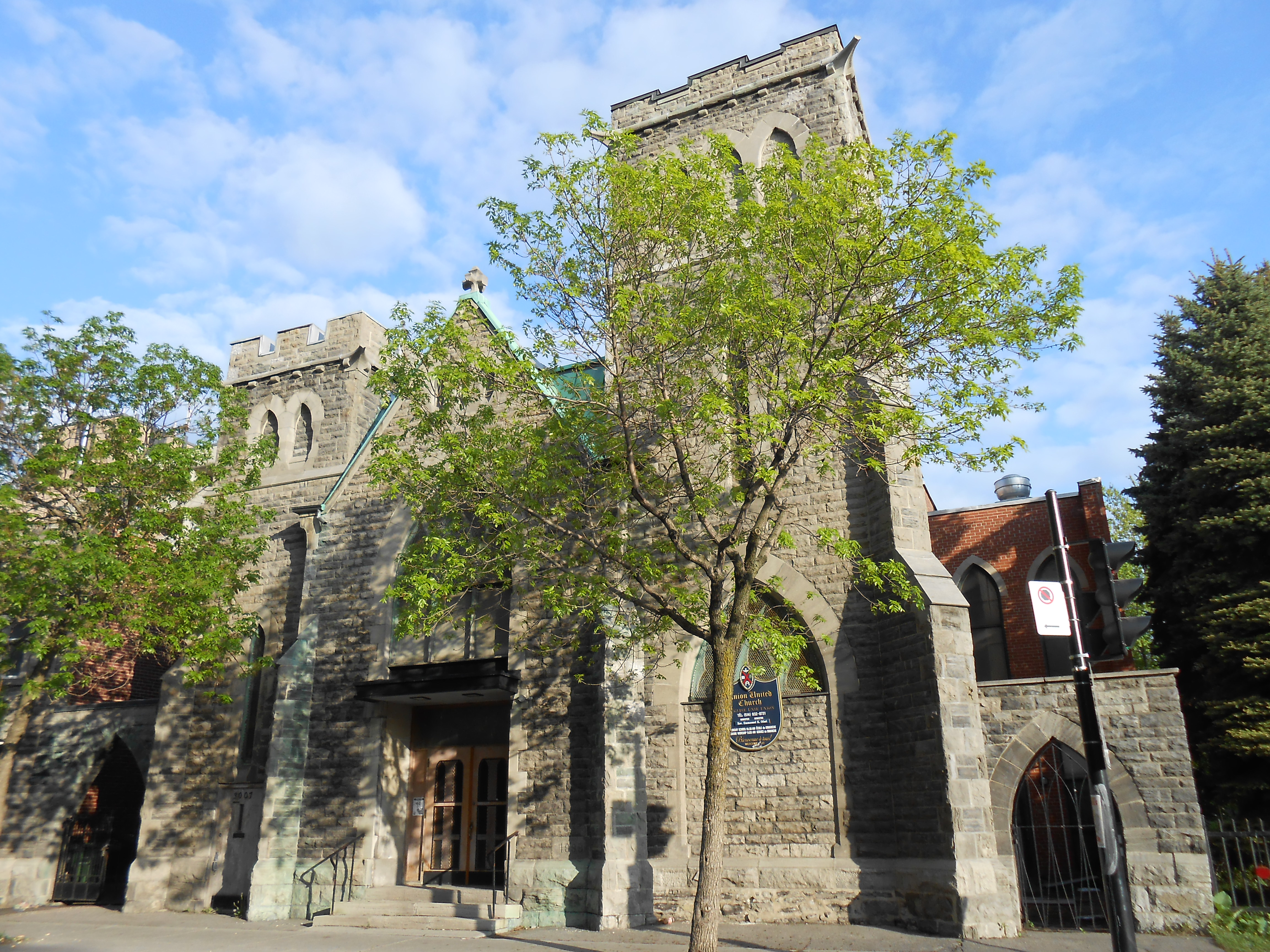

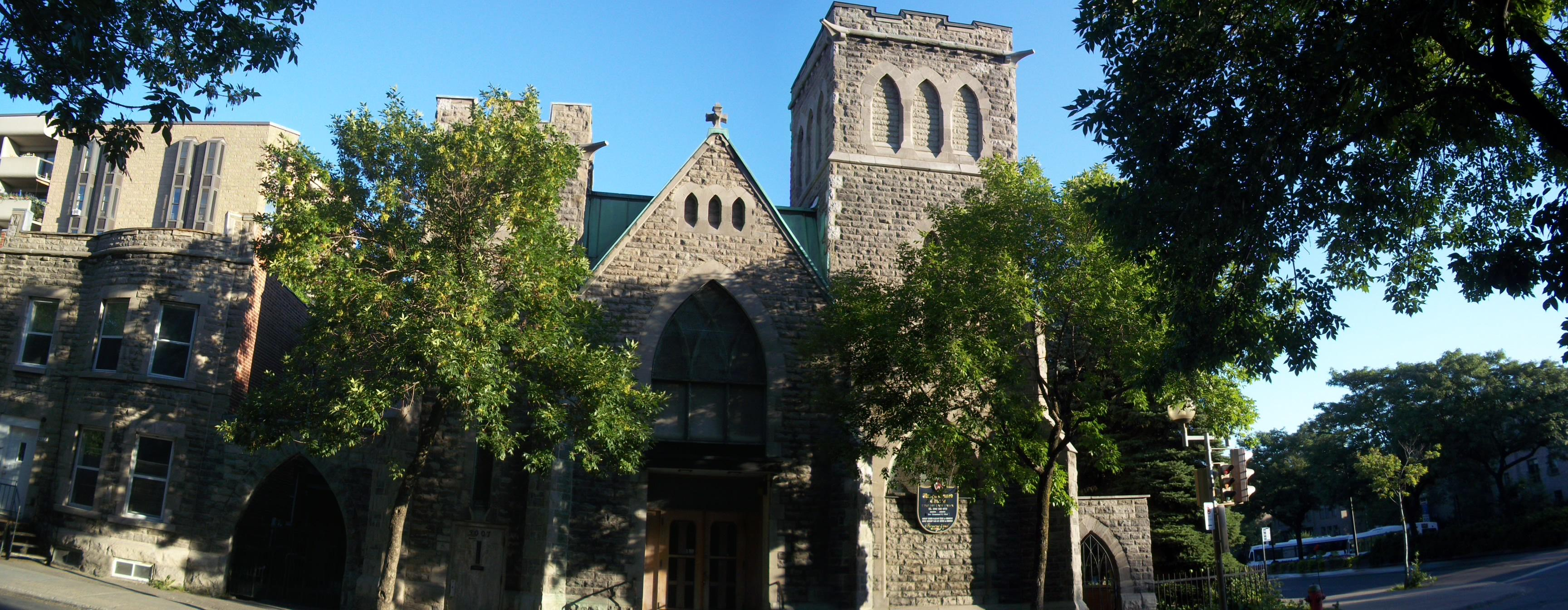

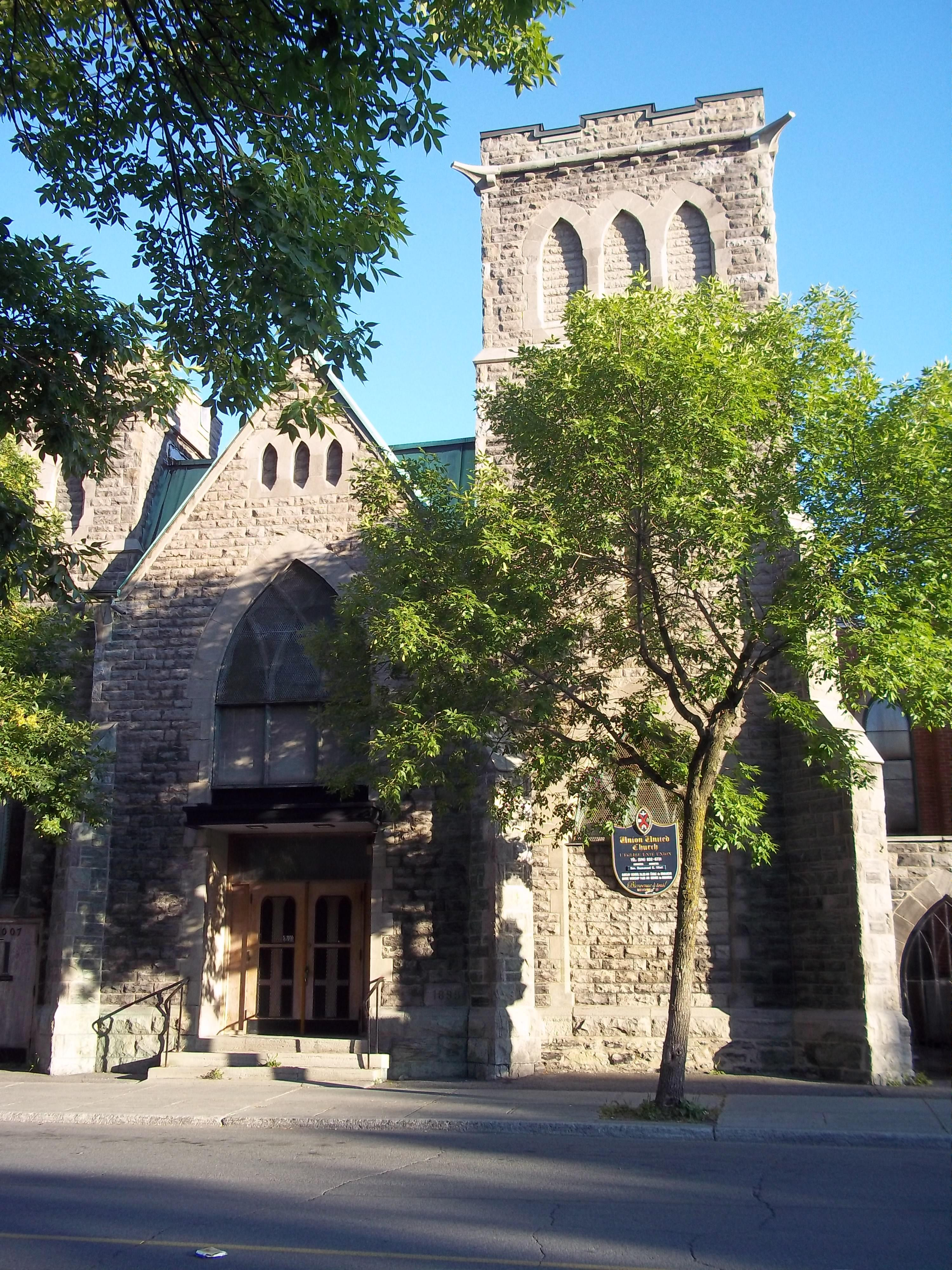

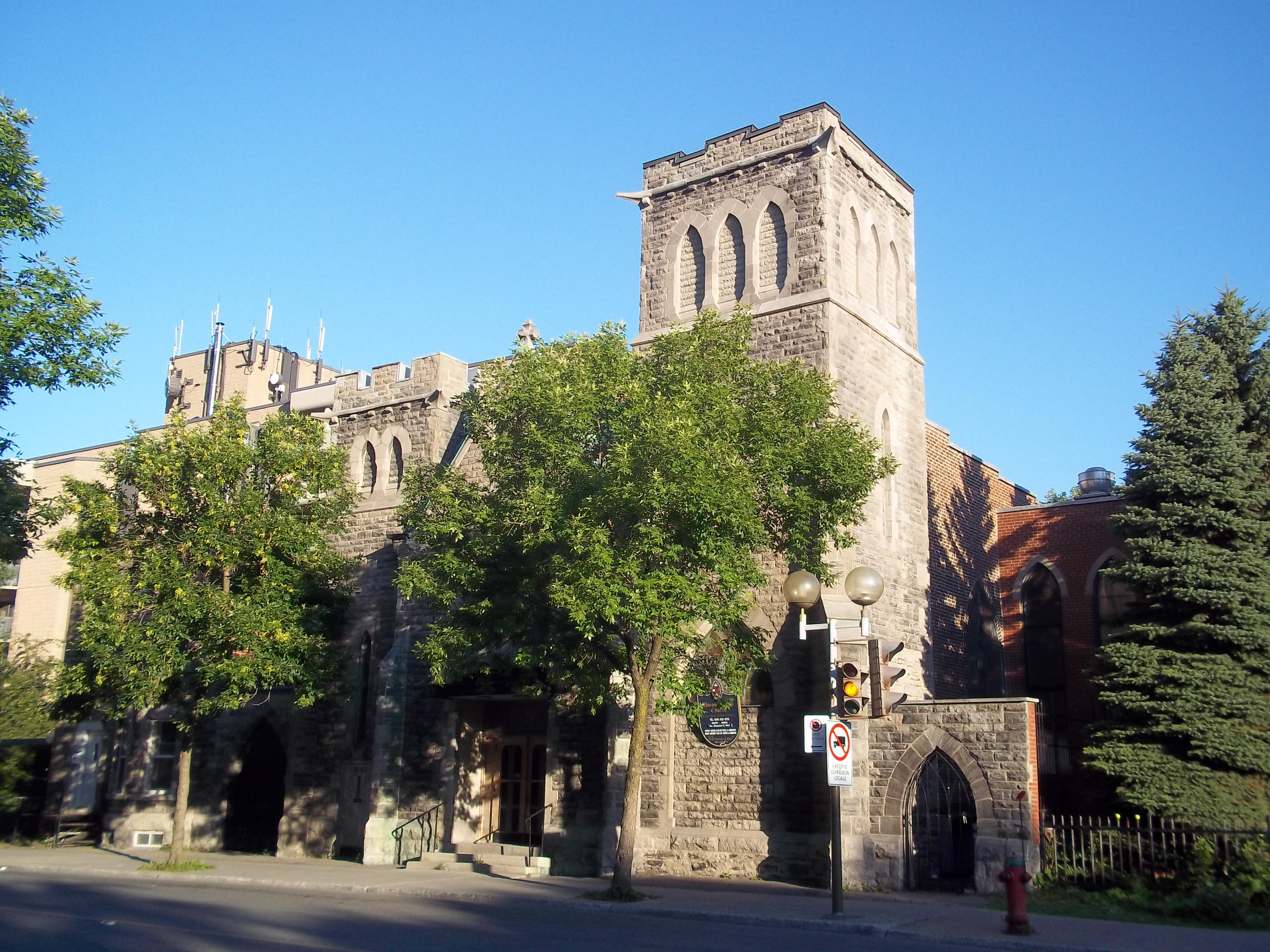

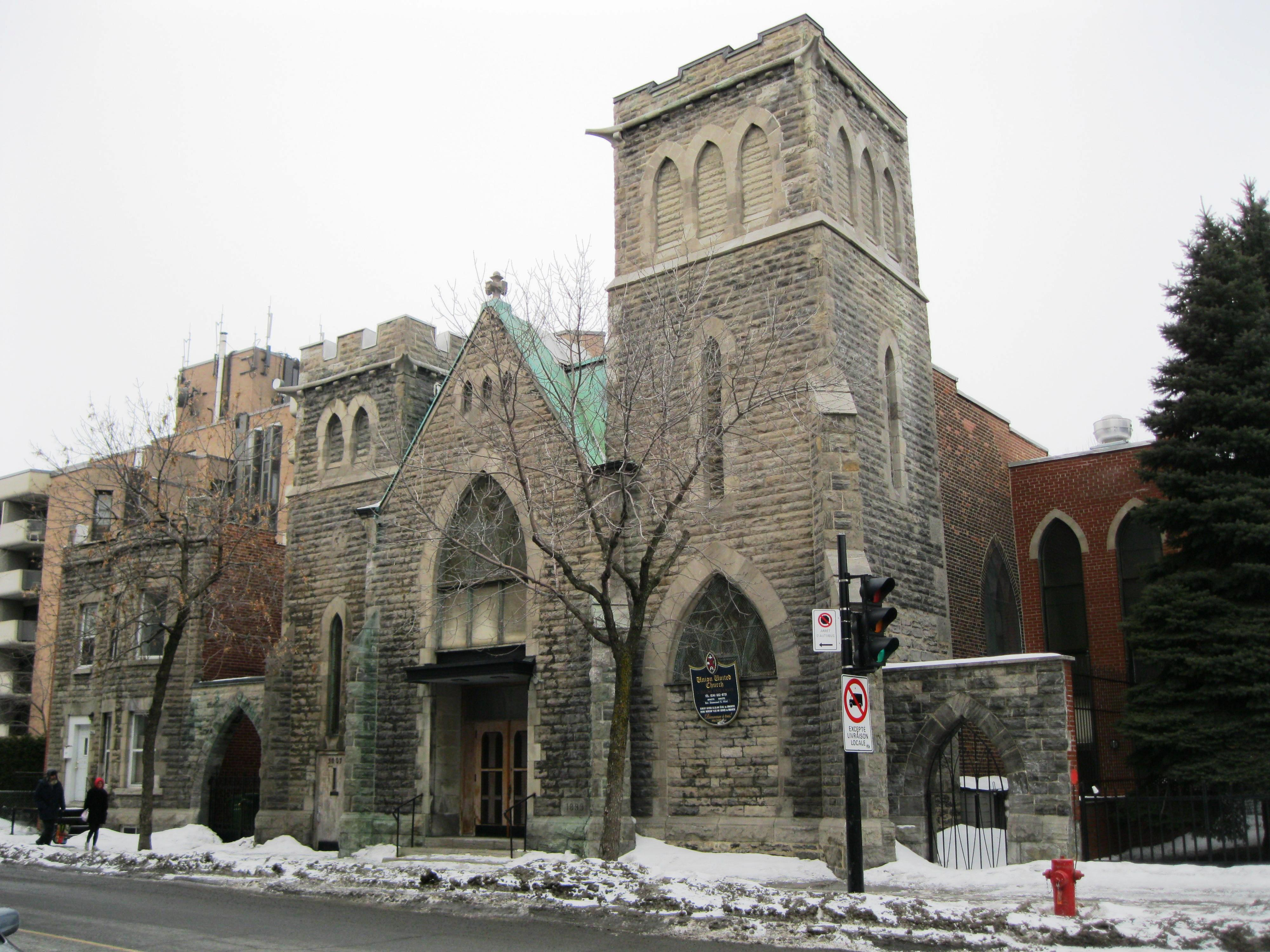

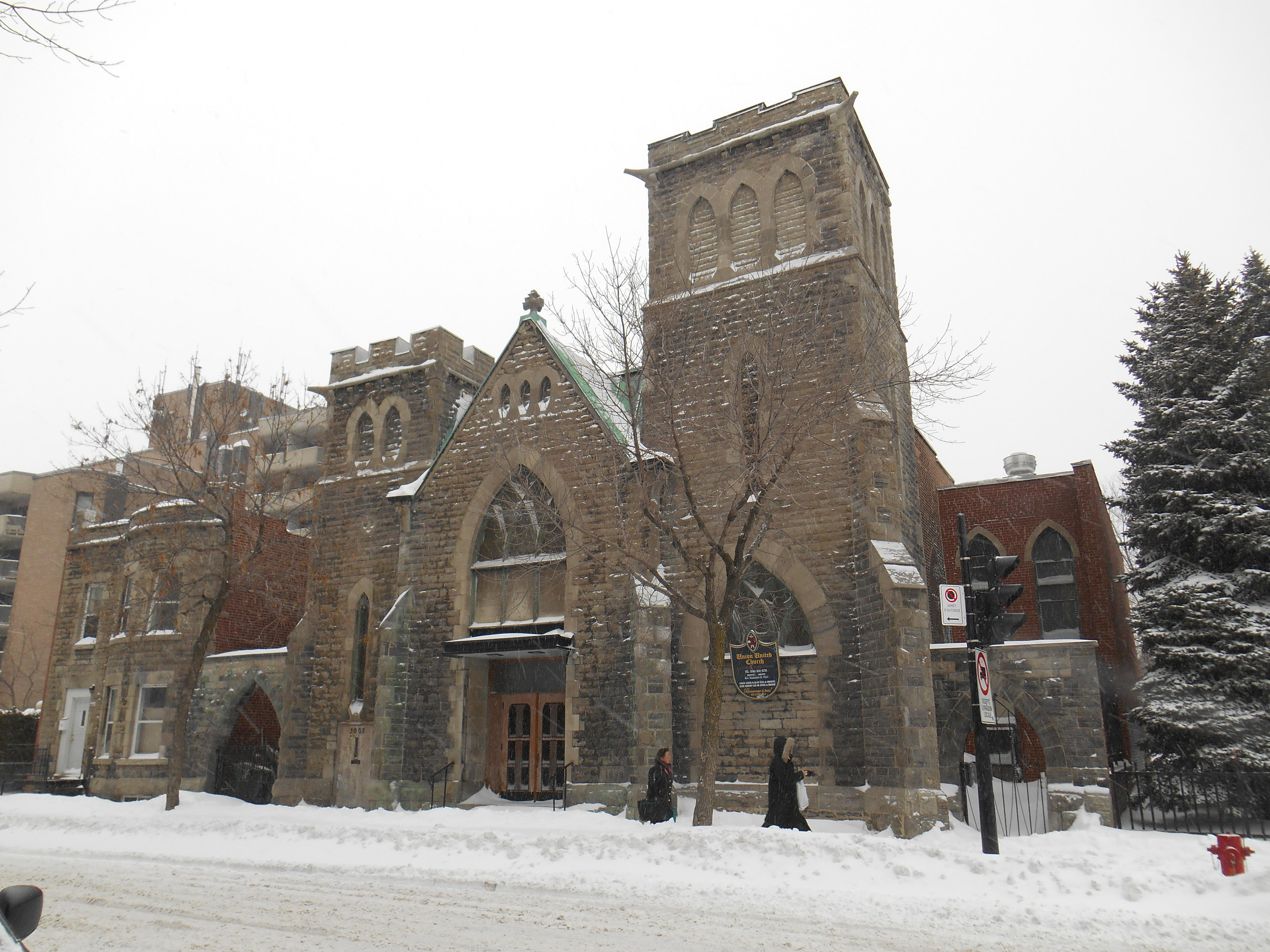

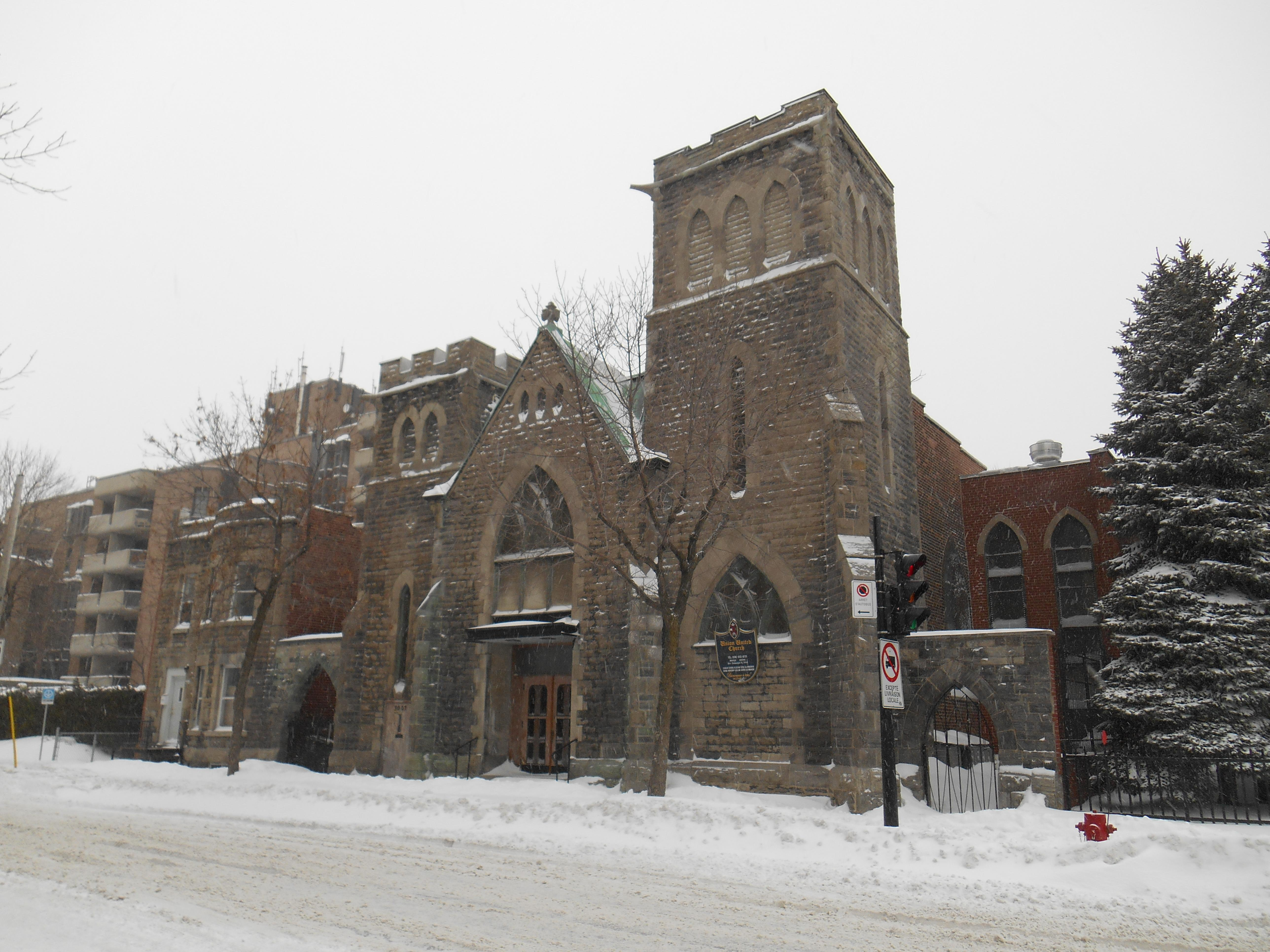

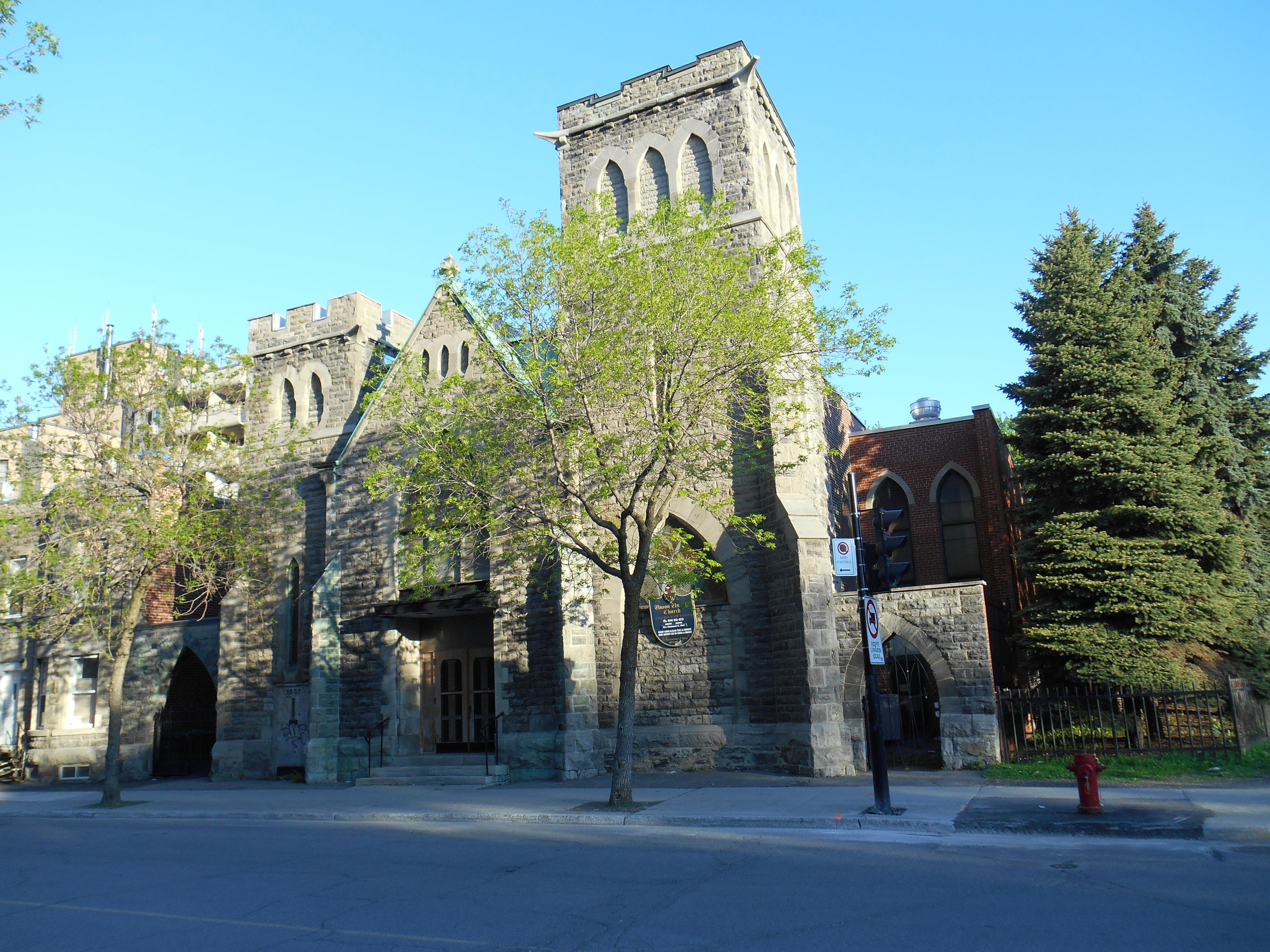
