= Canal de l'Aqueduc =

Aqueduct canal in Quebec, Canada

Coordinates: 45°26′25″N 73°35′48″W

The Canal de l'Aqueduc is an open-air aqueduct canal on the Island of Montreal in Quebec, Canada, serving part of the drinking water needs of the city of Montreal.

The canal was built in 1853 by a commission headed by City Councillor Edwin Atwater. The adjacent Atwater Avenue is named after him.

The canal draws water from the Saint Lawrence River on the southernmost shore of the island in the borough of LaSalle, in the Lachine Rapids downstream of the Honoré Mercier Bridge. It then runs northeasterly, through LaSalle and then between the boroughs of Verdun and Le Sud-Ouest, finally ending at a City of Montreal pumping station and underground reservoir on av. Atwater just south of the Pointe-Saint-Charles neighbourhood. At this point the canal passes within 300 metres of the Lachine Canal. The canal is approximately 8100 metres in length and varies between 35 and 50 metres in width (approximate).

The canal is lined with wetland along its route, and although the canal itself is fenced off, a linear park and bicycle path runs along its southern bank. Boul. de La Vérendrye and Boul. Champlain, major streets, run along its northern and southern banks respectively, with the Autoroute 15 running along the end nearest the pumping station.

== Crossings ==
The canal is crossed by a number of bridges, listed here in order from the river to the pumping station:

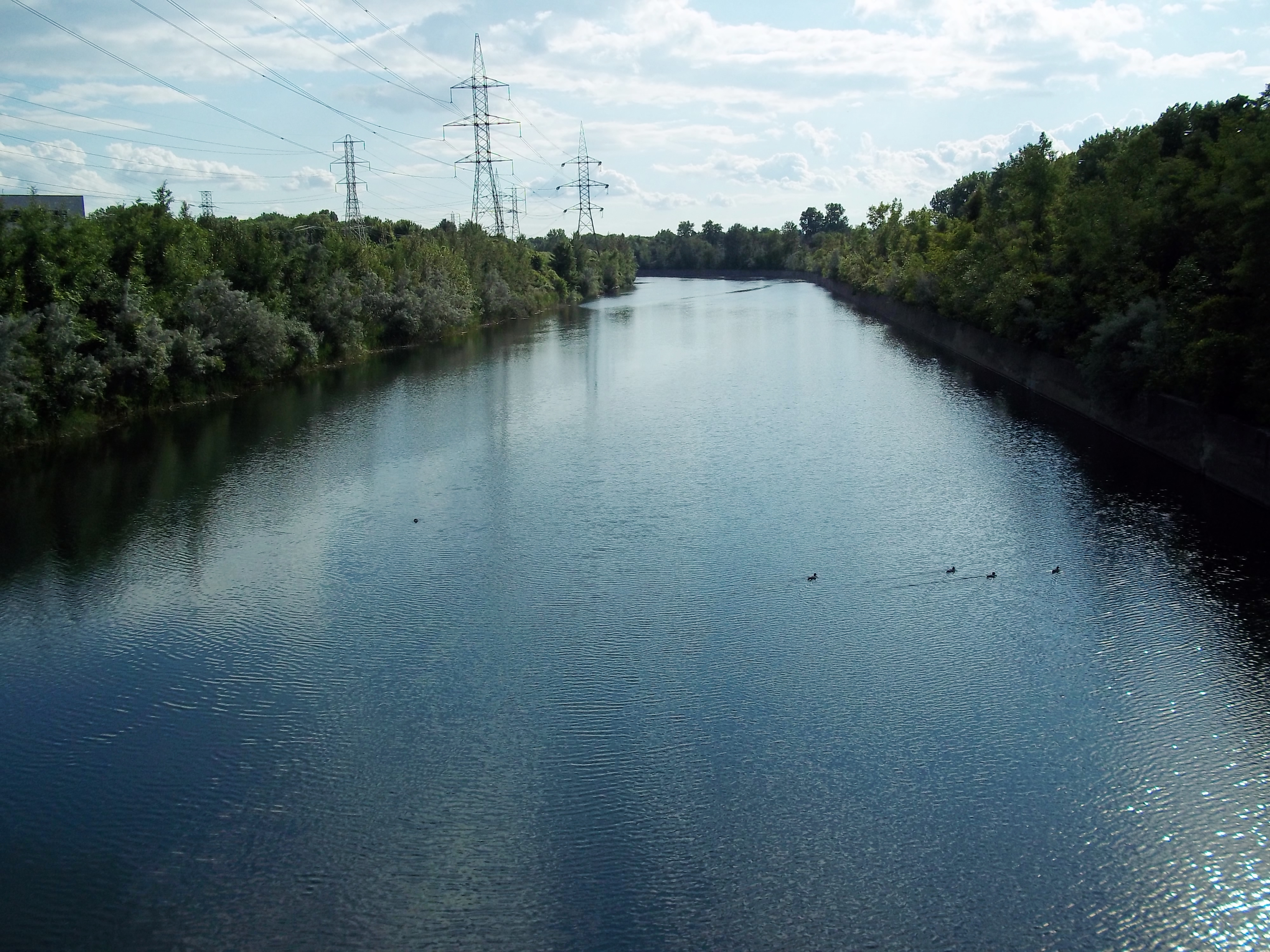
Canal de l'Aqueduc, Avenue Dollard

- Boul. LaSalle
- Avenue Dollard
- Knox Bridge (Boul. Bishop-Power/Boul. Shevchenko)
- Passerelle Lapierre (2e Ave)
- Rue Crawford (footbridge)
- Claude-Brunet Bridge (footbridge in front of Parc Angrignon)
- Av. Stephens
- Av. Woodland
- Jolicoeur Bridge (rue Jolicoeur)
- Rue Galt
- Av. de l'Église
