= Atwater Market =

Farmer's market in Montreal

Coordinates: 45.479452°N 73.576630°W

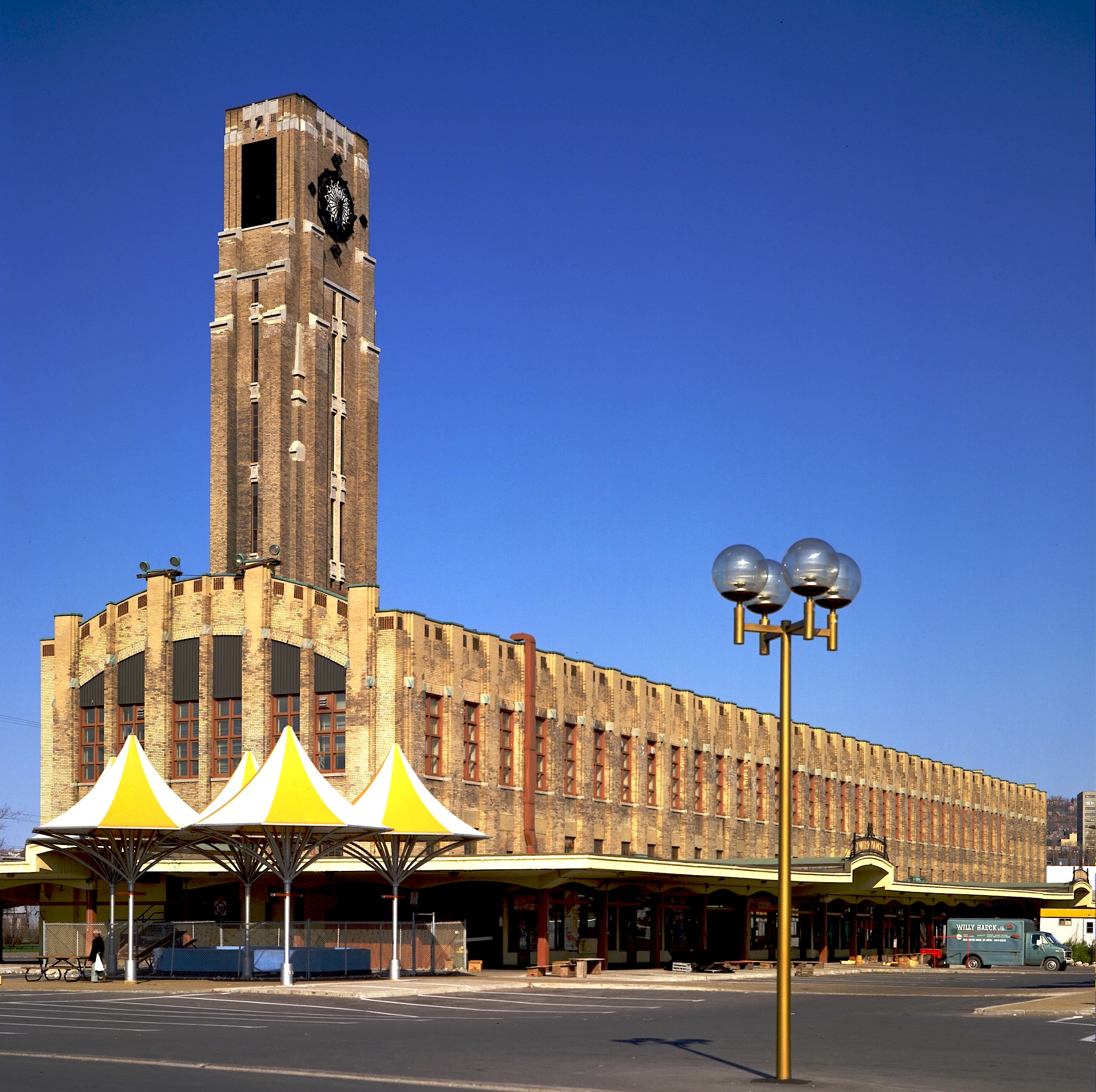
- Interactive map of the Atwater Market area

General information
- Architectural style: Art deco
- Location: Atwater Street, Montreal
- Opened: 1933; 93 years ago

Design and construction
- Architect: Ludger Lemieux

Other information
- Public transit access: Montreal Metro: Lionel-Groulx; Charlevoix

The Atwater Market is located in the Saint-Henri neighourhood in southwestern Montreal, Quebec, Canada. This market hall opened in 1933. The interior is used by many butchers and is home to a Première Moisson bakery. The outside market has many farmers' stalls, which sell both local and imported produce, as well as two cheese stores, a wine store and a fish store.

The market's Art Deco building was designed by architect Ludger Lemieux, working with his son, Paul Lemieux. It is located on Atwater Street, near the Lachine Canal, as well as Greene Avenue. A pedestrian bridge, which can also be used by bicycles, connects the market to Saint-Patrick Street and to a bicycle path in Pointe-Saint-Charles on the other side of the Lachine Canal. The presence of this bridge explains the popularity of this market with bike riders, who often stop there, and contributes to the summer ambiance of the area. The bike path travels from the Old Port of Montreal to the Lachine Marina and is owned and maintained by Parks Canada.

The area immediately east and west of the market has experienced gentrification, with a number of upscale condominiums being built right on the Lachine Canal, causing rent prices in the area to increase rapidly. Since the Lachine Canal reopened in 2002, residential property values in the Southwest borough have shot up by 61%, according to Montreal's 2006 property valuation roll, with the highest growth happening around the Atwater Market.

== Origin of the name ==
Atwater Market takes its name from the adjacent Atwater Street, which was named in 1871 after Edwin Atwater (1808–1874), a municipal alderman of the district of Saint-Antoine.

== Gallery ==
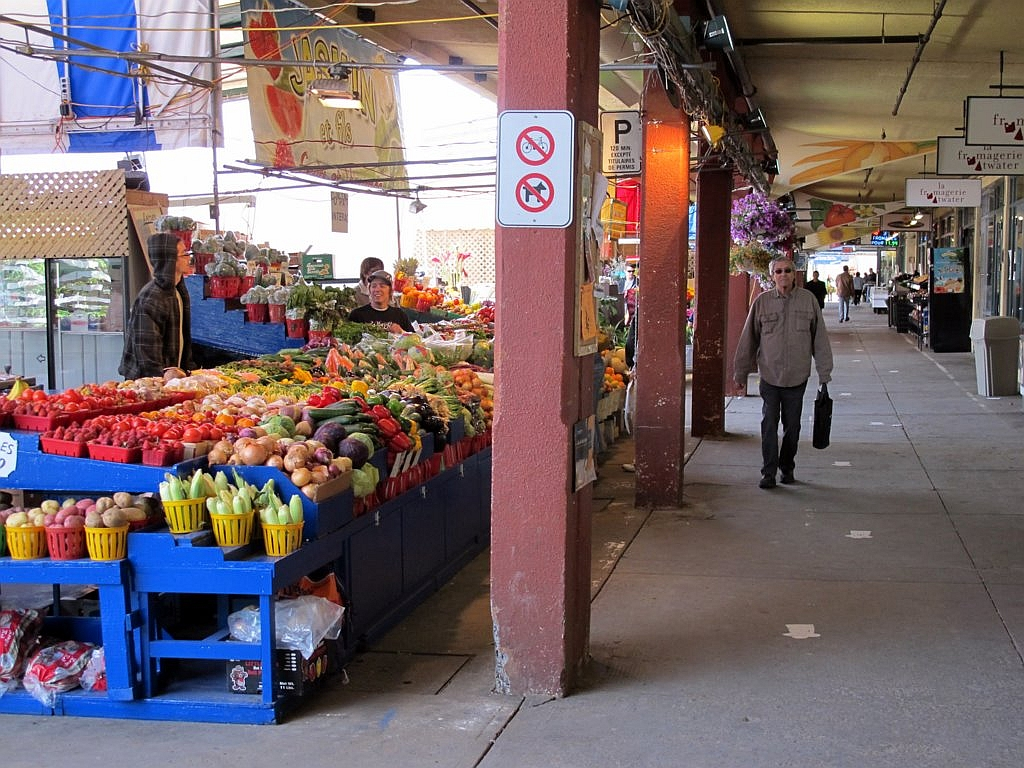
Shops outside the Market

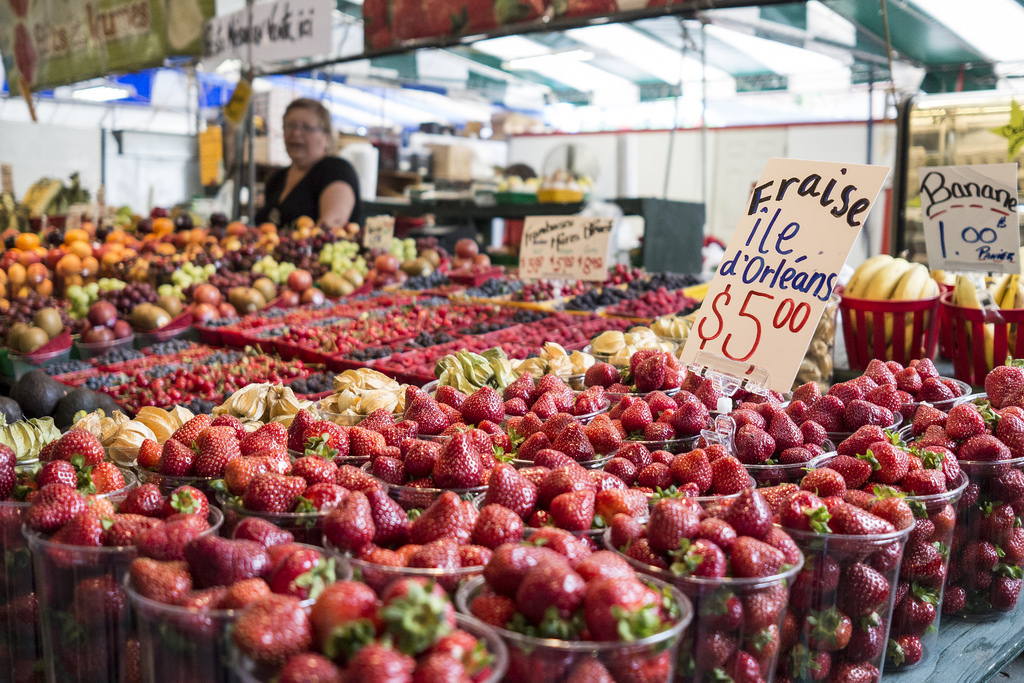
Strawberries on sale at the Market

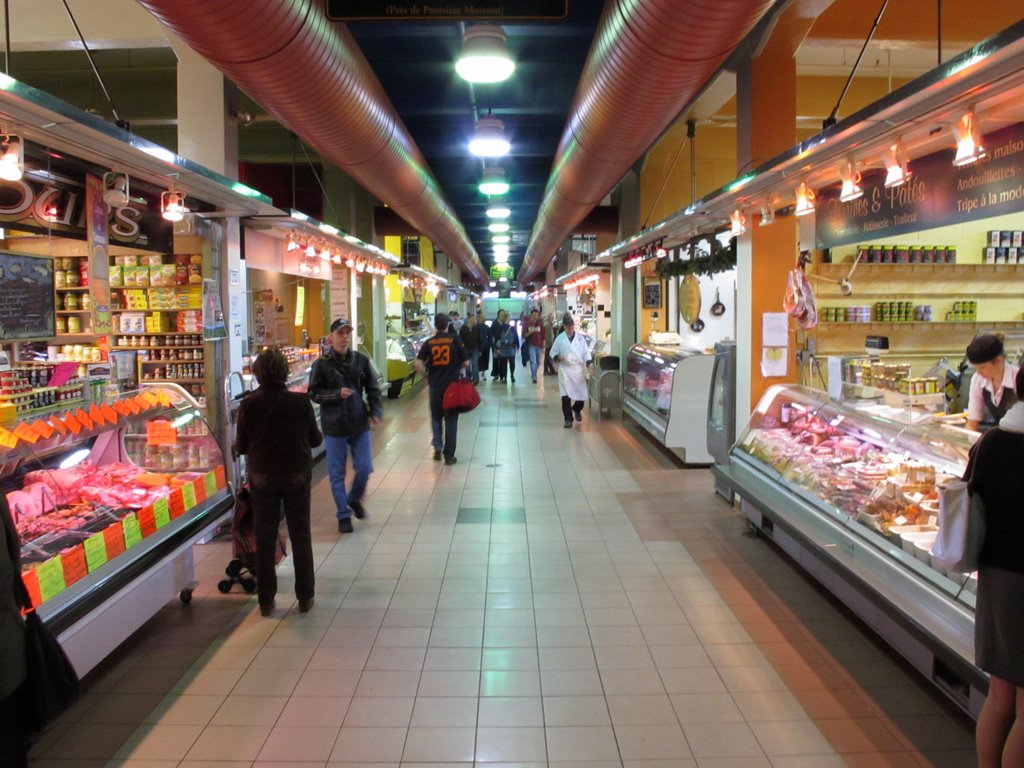
Food sold inside the Market

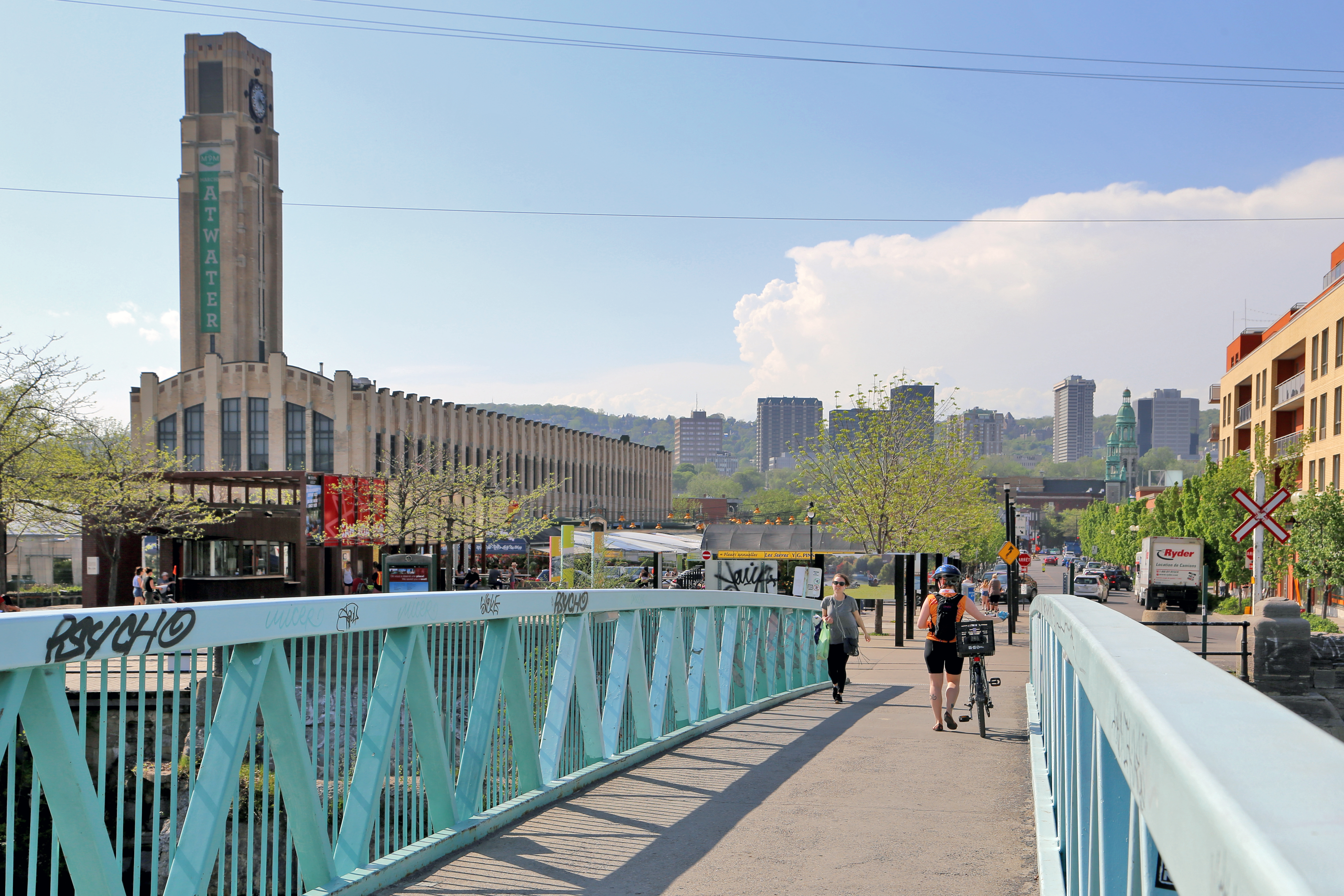
The pedestrian and bicycle bridge across the Lachine Canal heading towards the Market

== See also ==
- Jean-Talon Market
