= Canadian National class O-8 0-6-0T =

Grand Trunk Railway F3 & F4 Canadian National class O-8
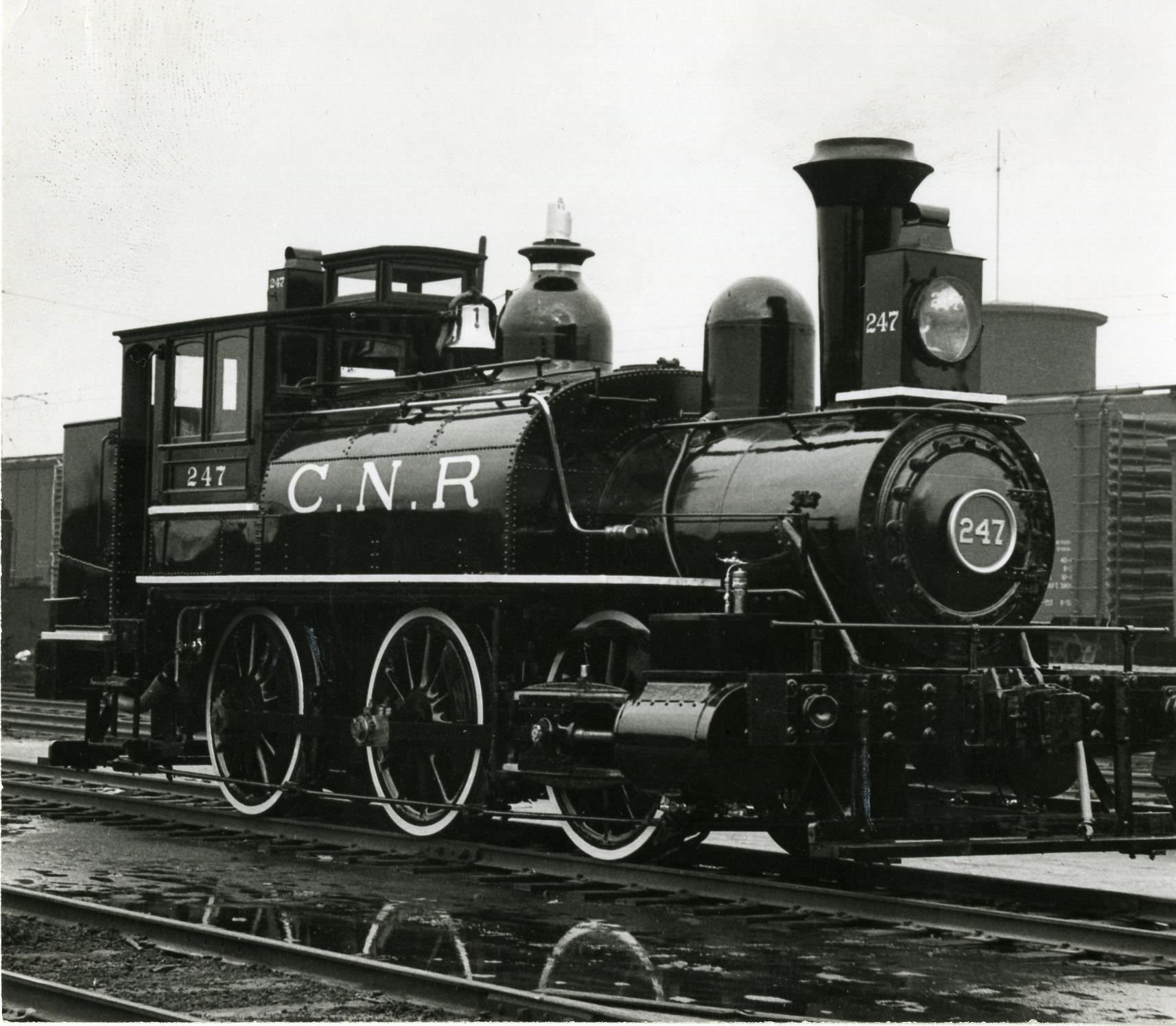
Type and origin
- Power type: Steam
- Builder: Grand Trunk Railway's Point St. Charles Shops
- Build date: 1884–1895
- Total produced: 44
Specifications
- Configuration
  - Whyte: 0-6-0ST
  - UIC: C n2t
- Gauge: 4 ft 8 1/2 in (1,435 mm)
- Driver dia.: 58 in (1,473 mm)
- Fuel type: Coal
- Boiler pressure: 140 lbf/in^{2} (965 kPa)
- Cylinders: Two, outside
- Cylinder size: 18 in × 22 in (457 mm × 559 mm)
- Valve gear: Stephenson
- Valve type: Piston valves
- Loco brake: Air
- Train brakes: Air
- Couplers: Knuckle
Performance figures
- Tractive effort: 15,000 lbf (66.7 kN)
Career
- Operators: Grand Trunk Railway → Canadian National Railways
- Class: GT F3 → CN O-8-b; GT F4 → CN O-8-a
- Retired: 1918–1940

Canadian National Railway class O-8 was a class of 0-6-0ST type steam locomotives. Forty-four tank locomotives were built by the Grand Trunk Railway (GT) in their Point St. Charles shops from 1884 through 1895. Most were built with round-topped saddle-tanks and classified as F4 by GT and later O-8-a by CN, but the eight built in 1887 had rectangular side tanks and were designated as class F3 by GT and O-8-b by CN. Thirty-nine of the class survived to receive CN numbers, but most were scrapped or sold within the first decade of CN operation. Two remained in service until 1940. CN number 7105 was sold to Consolidated Sand and Gravel Company in 1928 and served as their number 101 until repurchased in 1952 for the CN Museum Train. It was renumbered 247 and transferred to the Canada Science and Technology Museum in 1967.

Date	Works numbers	GT numbers (first)	GT numbers (1898)	GT numbers (1902)	GT numbers (1910)	CN Nos. (1923)	Quantity	Retired	Notes
1880	1053–1054	20, 23	621–622	16–17	2567–2568	—	2	1918	sold to industry
1884	1140–1143, 1146–1147, 1145–1146	13–19, 21	623–630	18–25	2569–2576	7085–7091	8	1919–1937	
1887	1155–1162	25–26, 29–30, 34–37	631–638	26–33	2577–2584	7118–7123	8	1920–1928	built with side tanks; GT class F3, CN O-8-b; one sold to industry
1889	1173–1178	22, 24, 27, 32–33, 38	639–644	34–39	2585–2590	7092–7097	6	1925–1926	
1893–1894	1264–1273	5–8, 28, 31, 247–250	645–650, 662–664, 651	40–45, 57–59, 47	2591–2596, 2598–2600, 2597	7098–7103, 7105–7107, 7104	10	1925–1940	Five sold to industry
1895	1282–1288, 1279–1281	251–257, 46, 245–246	652–661	47–56	2601–2610	7108–7117	10	1924–1940	
