= Brian McConnell =

Brian McConnell may refer to:

- Brian McConnell (civil engineer) (1836—1930), Canadian civil engineer
- Brian McConnell, Baron McConnell (1922–2000), Northern Ireland politician
- Brian McConnell (American football) (born 1950), American football player
