= Brian McConnell (civil engineer) =

Canadian civil engineer (1836–1930)

- Born: 29 February 1836; Gaspe Basin, Lower Canada
- Died: 13 July 1930 (aged 94); North Bay, Ontario, Canada
- Occupation: Civil engineer

Brian Douglas McConnell (29 February 1836 in Gaspe Basin, Lower Canada — 13 July 1930 in North Bay, Ontario, Canada) was one of Canada's "pioneer railway builders." He was educated as a civil engineer at Sorel in Quebec City (1846-1853).

== Career ==
After graduating, McConnell was articled to the land surveyor Robert Hayden in 1853 and began professional employment at the office of Thomas Keefer in 1854. While at that firm, he worked as a rodman on the construction of the Canal de l'Aqueduc. Between 1854 and 1870 McConnell lived in Quebec and worked on such contracts as dredging and improving Montreal Harbour (1863) and the Quebec Harbour (1866).

McConnell is best known, however, for his work on the Canadian Pacific Railway. He was among the eighteen civil engineers to originally survey the north shore of Lake Superior in 1878. At this time, he was employed by the Government of Canada as the C.P.R. had not yet assumed charge over the project. Having completed his work in Northern Ontario, McConnell returned to Montreal and became the superintendent for the city's water works where he remained until 1892. He was the resident engineer for the city of Westmount (1893-1896) and finally entered into private practice and remained as such until 1916.

He was a member of the Canadian Society of Civil Engineers, the Engineering Institute of Canada, the Land Surveyors of Quebec, the New England Water Works Association, and a member of the Church of England. McConnell's early work on the Canadian Pacific Railway and subsequent achievements makes him an important figure in the history of Canada, and Canadian engineering. McConnell's official biographer is historian, Daniel Hambly.
