= Ludger Lemieux =

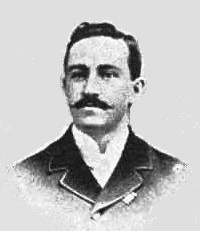
- Born: February 9, 1872; Farnham, Quebec Canada
- Died: October 27, 1953 (aged 81); Montreal Quebec, Canada
- Education: McGill University
- Occupation: Architect
- Practice: 1897-1953
- Buildings: Saint-Henri Fire Station, Atwater Market

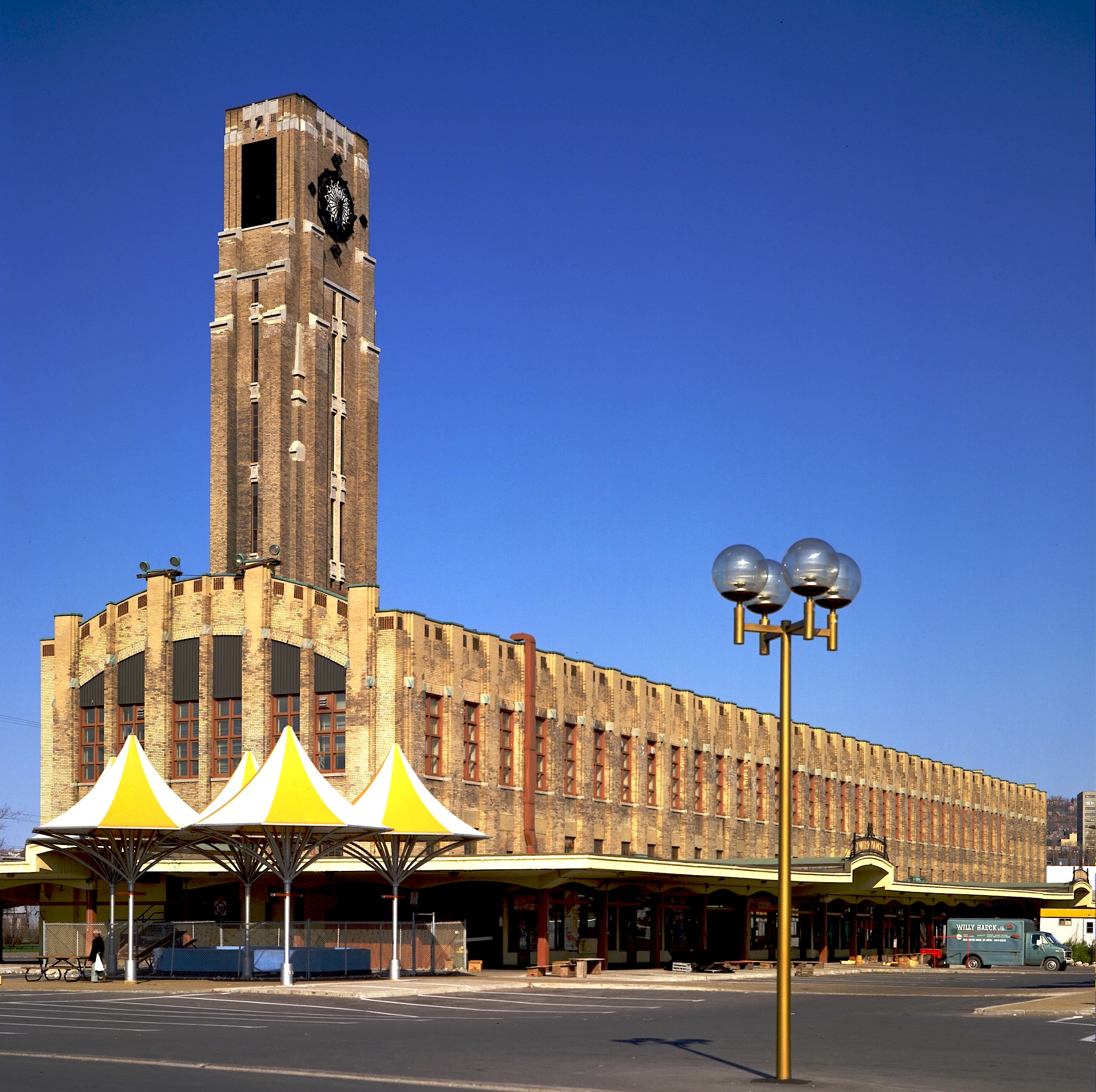
Atwater Market.

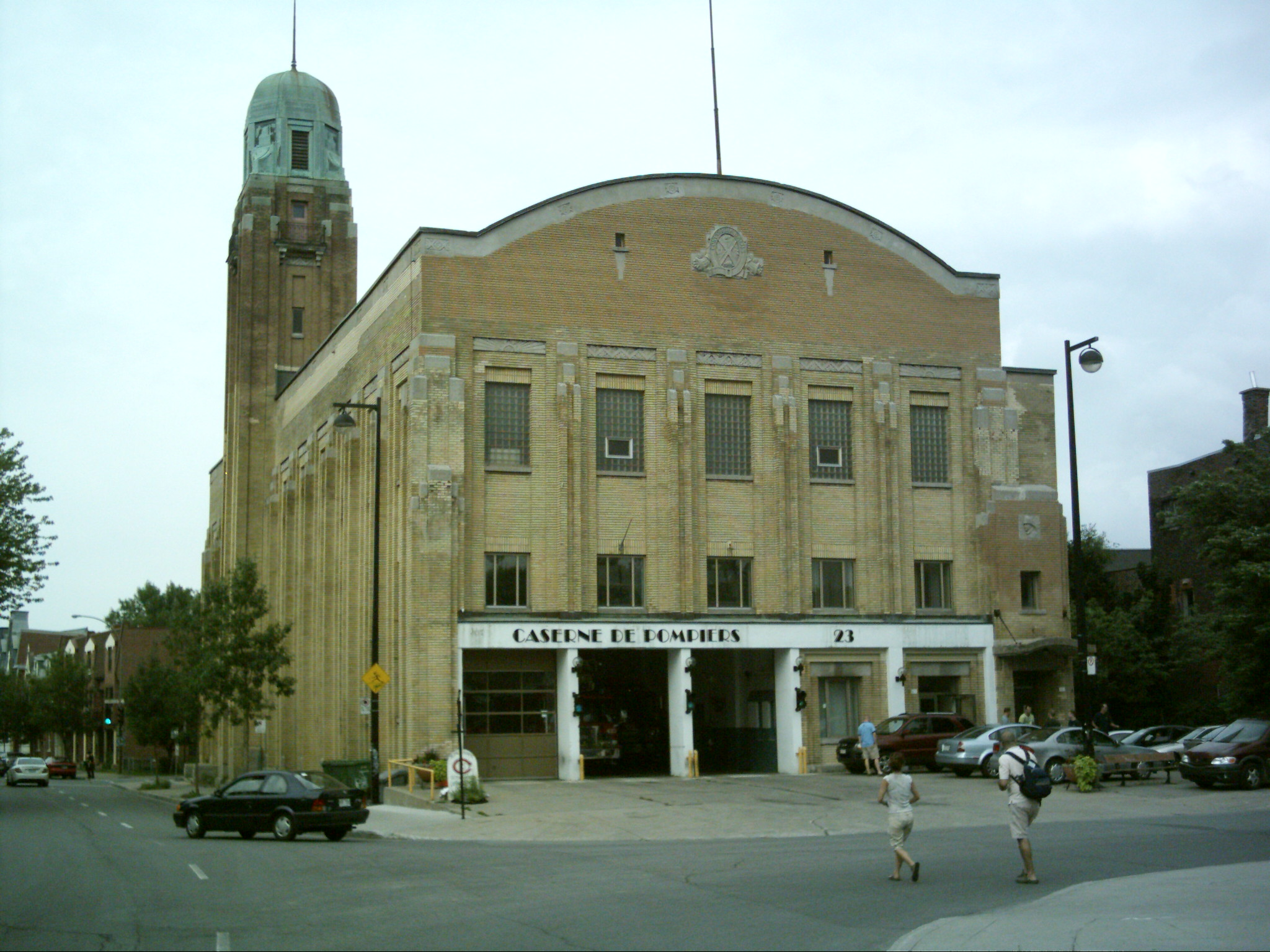
Saint-Henri fire hall.

Ludger Lemieux (February 9, 1872 – October 27, 1953) was a Quebec architect who designed a number of notable Art deco structures in Montreal's Saint-Henri district. While he often worked in partnership with Joseph-Honoré MacDuff, his best-known structure, the Atwater Market, was designed not with MacDuff but with his son Paul M. Lemieux.

He was born in Farnham, Quebec to parents Moïse Lemieux and Marie Melanie Serre. He studied at McGill University before his architectural practice after 1897.

He was married to Marie Louise Pare and had six children including Paul Marie Lemieux.

He worked with Macduff from 1897 to 1918, then on his own until 1931 when his son Paul M. Lemieux (1902-1968) joined to work with father.

== Projects ==
Lemieux, his partner as well as his sons were involved in 500 projects from the late 19th Century to mid 20th Century:

- Atwater Market (1938 avenue Atwater) 1933
- Église Saint-Vincent-Ferrier (301 rue Jarry est) 1931
- Saint-Henri Fire Station (Caserne de Pompiers 23 - 521-523 Place Saint-Henri) 1930
- Église Saint-Vincent-de-Paul (2310 rue Sainte-Catherine est) 1928
- Église Saint-Zotique (4565 rue Notre-Dame ouest) 1927 - with René Charbonneau, the architect of the Outremont Theatre.
- Telephone Exchange (831 avenue Rockland) 1914 with Joseph-Roméo Gadbois et Jean-Julien Perrault
- Église Sainte-Élisabeth-de-Portugale (670 rue de Courcelle) 1912 with Joseph-Honoré MacDuff; replaced in 1957-1958 and now demolished
- Wilder Store (282-288 rue Sainte-Catherine ouest) 1912 with Joseph-Honoré MacDuff
- Maison Camille Legault (557 rue Cote-Sainte-Catherine) 1912 with Joseph-Honoré MacDuff
- Grovers Building (Tooke Brothers Limited factory) (640-644 rue de Courcelle) 1907-1912 with Joseph-Honoré MacDuff
- Workman Building 1907
- Église Sainte-Irénée (3030 rue de Delisle & avenue Atwater next to Atwater Market) 1904 with Joseph-Honoré MacDuff
- Église St. Charles Church (2115 rue Centre) 1899 with Joseph-Honoré MacDuff
- Maison Albert Holmes (4286 rue de Maisonneuve Boulevard ouest) 1899 with Joseph-Honoré MacDuff
- Saint-Jeanne-de-Chantal school
- Bibliothèque Notre Dame (4707 rue de Notre-Dame ouest) 1898 - formerly Caserne de pompiers 24 with Joseph-Honoré MacDuff

== Other ==
Ludger is a bar in Saint-Henri named after Lemieux.
