= Bâtiment 7 (Montreal) =

Building in Montreal, Canada

Coordinates: 45.4809°N 73.5523°W

Bâtiment 7 is a space of 90,000 square foot in Montreal in the Quebec province in Canada, converted into a shared community space, in the Pointe Saint-Charles neighborhood of Montreal. It is located on the previous plot of real estate owned by the train company Canadian National Railway (CN).

In 2003, a group of persons living in Pointe Saint-Charles planted a symbolic flag on the terrain that hosted old CN workshops. The popular movement was demanding adapted facilities on the lot for the neighbourhood. Two years after the start of the campaign, CN transferred the lot for a symbolic C$1 to Groupe Mach, a real estate entity that was to facilitate movement of Casino de Montréal to the area, financed jointly by Loto Québec and Cirque du Soleil. A protest was mobilized by various community associations and after 14 years of activism was able to take legal possession of the plot in 2016. Decontamination efforts were pursued and in May 2018, Bâtiment 7 opened its doors. The struggle for the development of the area resulted in the citizens acquiring further space around the facility for community use in 2021.

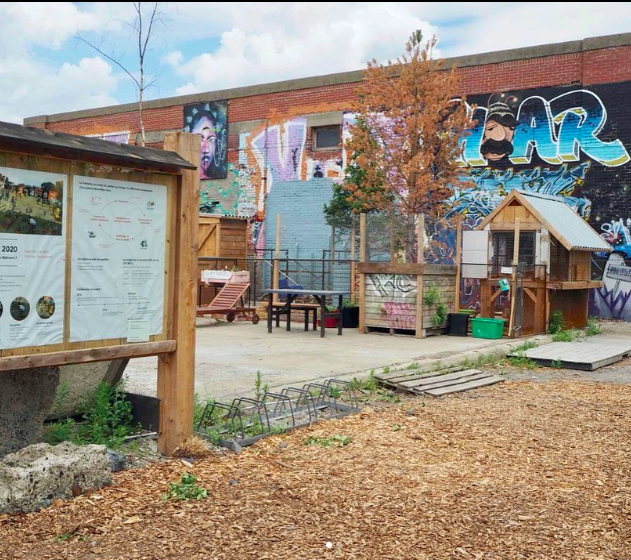
Le Bâtiment 7 urban micro farm chicken coop

Bâtiment 7 is a complex run independently by the collective "7 à Nous". It included various projects including Le Détour fruits, vegetables and food store run by volunteers, in an area in need of affordable priced food, also Sans-Taverne, a home beer cooperative that distributes beers and alcoholic products in more than 100 locations and bars. The complex also includes the cooperative Press Start that organizes lectures and debates in public gatherings of youth between 14 and 21 years, as well as a diy video arcade and La Coulée, a solidarity collective teaching various skills including metallurgy. Other collaborative services include preparing cadres of auto and bicycle mechanics, carpentry, silk-screen printing, work on ceramics and photography. There is a community greenhouse, garden and small urban farm with a chicken coop. Other planned projects include a collaborative culinary space, child birth aid, a nursery and autonomous works.
