= Parc d'entreprises de la Pointe-Saint-Charles =

- Neighbourhood
- Location of the industrial parc in Montreal
- Coordinates: 45.481944°N 73.540278°W
- Country: Canada
- Province: Quebec
- City: Montreal
- Borough: Le Sud-Ouest

The Parc d'entreprises de la Pointe-Saint-Charles, formerly known as the Montreal Technoparc and Adaport Victoria, is an industrial park and former industrial dump in the Pointe-Saint-Charles neighbourhood of Montreal, between the Champlain and Victoria bridges.

== History ==
The site was formerly marshland adjacent to the St. Lawrence River. It was used as a landfill and dumpsite from 1866 until 1966, and then was paved to serve as a parking lot for Expo 67 and was named Autoparc Victoria. Following the Expo, it briefly served as the site of the Victoria STOLport, or adaport in French.
