= Lachine Canal =

Canal in southwestern Montreal, Canada

Coordinates: 45°27′30″N 73°36′42″W

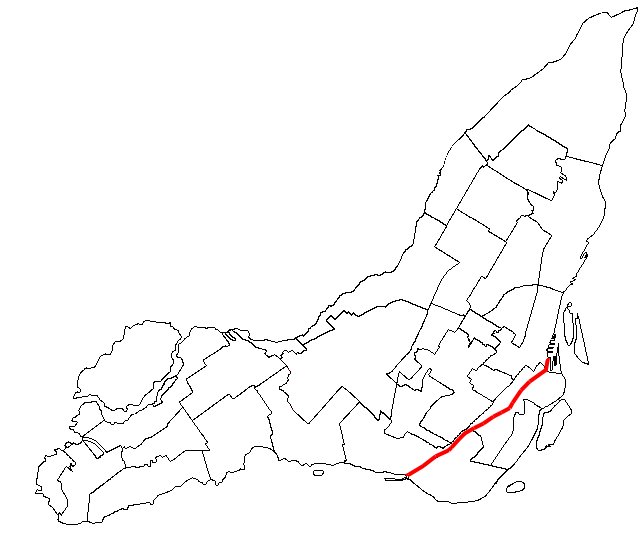
- The canal's path through Montreal's boroughs
- Interactive map of Lachine Canal

Specifications
- Locks: 5 (originally 7)
- Maximum height AMSL: 65 ft (20 m)
- Navigation authority: Parks Canada

History
- Original owner: Company of the Proprietors of the Lachine Canal
- Principal engineer: Thomas Burnett
- Construction began: July 17, 1821
- Date of first use: 1825
- Date completed: August 24, 1824
- Date extended: 1843–1848, 1873–1885
- Date closed: 1970
- Date restored: 2002

Geography
- Start point: Old Port of Montreal
- End point: Lachine Lock

The Lachine Canal (French: Canal de Lachine, pronounced [kanal də laʃin]) is a canal passing through the southwestern part of the Island of Montreal, Quebec, Canada, running 14.5 kilometres (9 miles) from the Old Port of Montreal to Lake Saint-Louis, through the boroughs of Lachine, Lasalle and Sud-Ouest.

Before the canal construction there was a lake, Lac St-Pierre or Lac à la Loutre (Montréal) or Petit Lac St-Pierre. The lake and its rivers can be seen on the maps of Montreal of the years 1700, 1744 and on the map titled "The isles of Montreal. As they have been surveyed by the French engineers" (1761). The lake is now filled in and located near the Turcot Interchange on Autoroute 20.

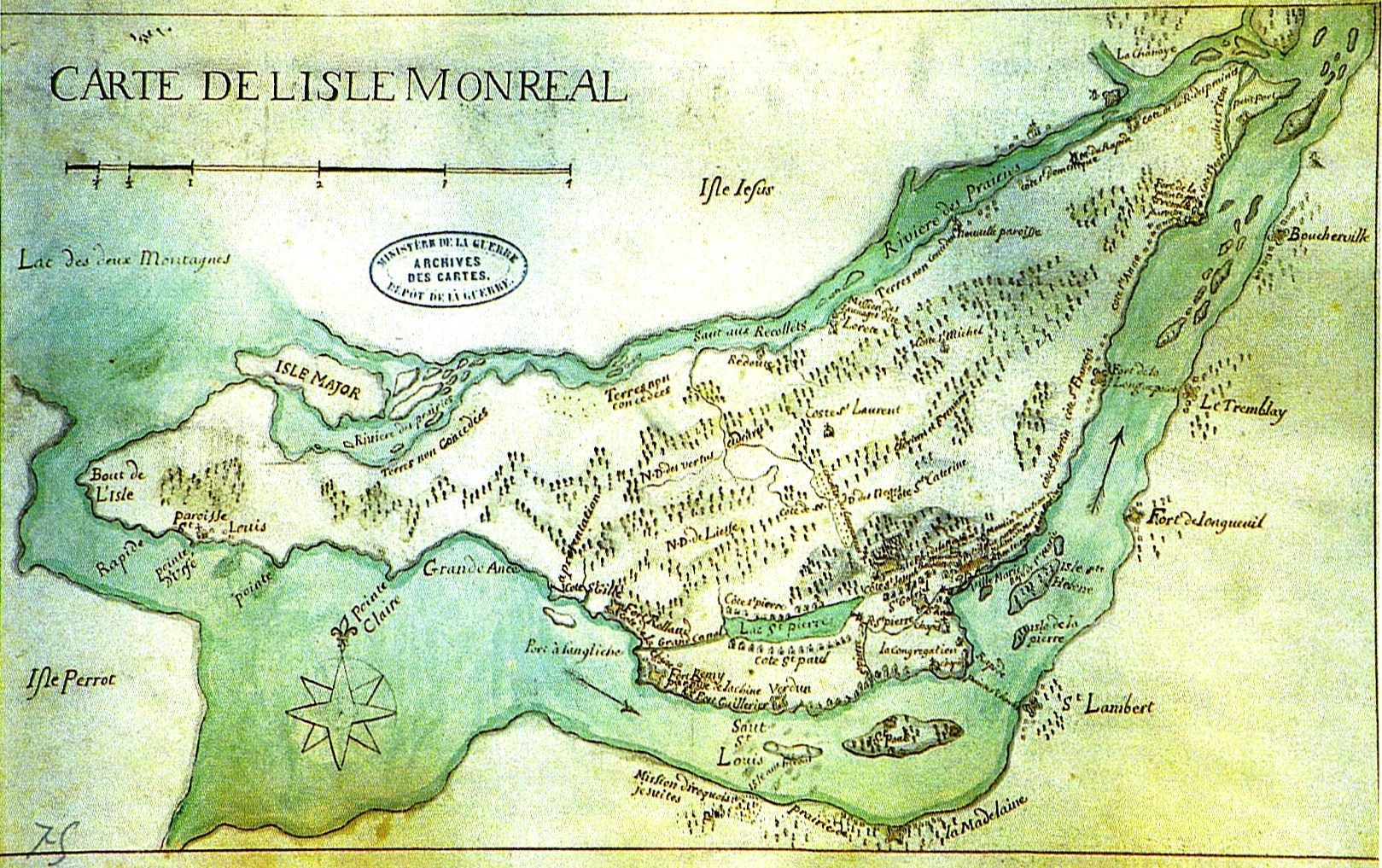
Map of Montreal, 1700

The canal gets its name from the French word for China (la Chine). The European explorers sought to find a route from New France to the Western Sea, and from there to China and hence auspiciously the region where the canal was built was named Lachine.

Due to the continuous disposal of industrial waste, the canal contains harmful substances, though the water quality is said to be good.

== History ==
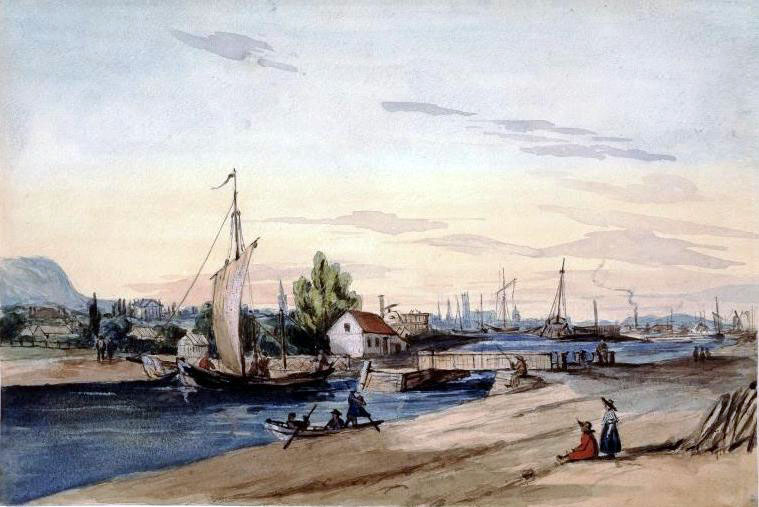
View of the canal in 1850

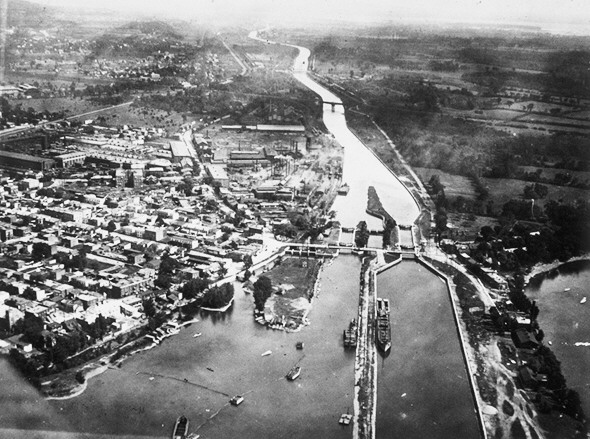
The Lachine Canal in 1920

The area of the canal is a traditional meeting place between the various indigenous groups of the region, the Algonquin, Huron and Iroquois. Suggestions for a possible canal to bypass the Lachine Rapids dated back to the time of early explorers such as Samuel de Champlain. Settlers and trade had to make a long portage to continue upstream of Montreal.

Interest in constructing a canal picked up after the land for the canal was granted by the King of France to the Society of the Priests of Saint Sulpice, who held a monopoly on grain on the island. Beginning in 1689, attempts were made by the French Colonial government and several other groups to build a canal. The first construction in 1689 was intended to bring water to the flour mills of the Sulpicians and increase the flow of goods. The project stopped after an attack in August 1689 by the Iroquois. After a peace treaty was made between the French and the Iroquois in 1701, there was hope by the Sulpicians that the canal project would be restarted. However, the Sulpicians had neither the capital nor the financial resources to restart the project.

After Quebec became a British colony, tensions between Quebec and the new United States led to the construction of small canals between Montreal and the Great Lakes. After the War of 1812, there was a heightened interest in a canal to bypass the rapids and facilitate the transfer of goods in the region on larger boats.

After more than 130 years of failure, a consortium that included the young Scottish immigrant John Redpath was successful. John Richardson was Chairman of the Committee of Management of the canal project and its chief engineer was Thomas Brunett. The contractors were Thomas McKay and John Redpath, plus the firms of Thomas Phillips & Andrew White and Abner Bagg & Oliver Wait.

The Lachine Canal was built to bypass the rapids at Lachine, upstream of Montreal. Freight and passengers destined for points past Lachine had to portage the 8 or 9 miles from Montreal's port to the village of Lachine where they could resume their trip by boat.

Work on the canal commenced on July 17, 1821, under Chief Engineer Thomas Burnett and Construction Engineer John Richardson. The original canal was 14 kilometres (8.7 mi) long and had seven locks, each 30 metres (98 ft) long, 6 metres (20 ft) wide and 1.5 metres (4.9 ft) deep. The new canal officially opened in 1825, helping turn Montreal into a major port and eventually attracting industry to its banks when the Society of Sulpician Order decided to sell lots.

During the 1840s, under Chief Engineer Charles Atherton, the Lachine Canal was deepened to allow heavier ships to pass through and hydraulic power was introduced to the industries on its banks. Through the enlargement of the canal, its use changed from solely a means of avoiding the Lachine rapids to that of an industrial region within Montreal. There were two major effects on the development of Montreal due to the enlargement of the Lachine Canal. The first was that by creating a route that bypassed the Lachine rapids and therefore opened the upper St Lawrence River to navigation, Montreal became a more convenient area for trade, effectively taking away shipping traffic from Quebec City and moving it to Montreal.

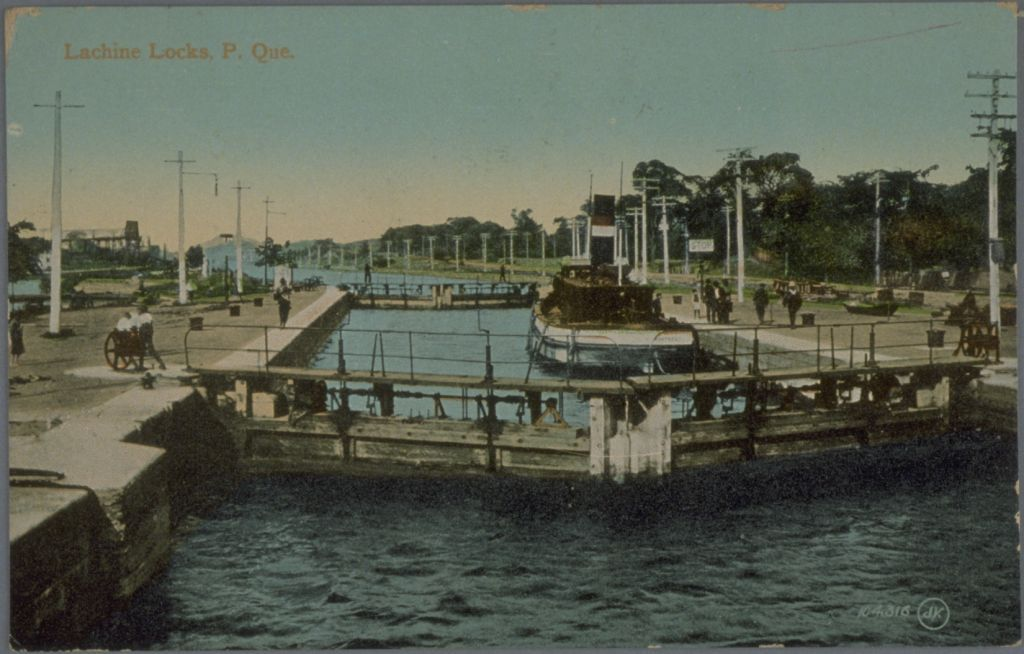
Lachine Locks

The second important shift that can be noted through the growth and development of the canal is the creation of industrial suburbs. Before the Lachine Canal, Montreal's industrial region was in what would be considered the downtown area.

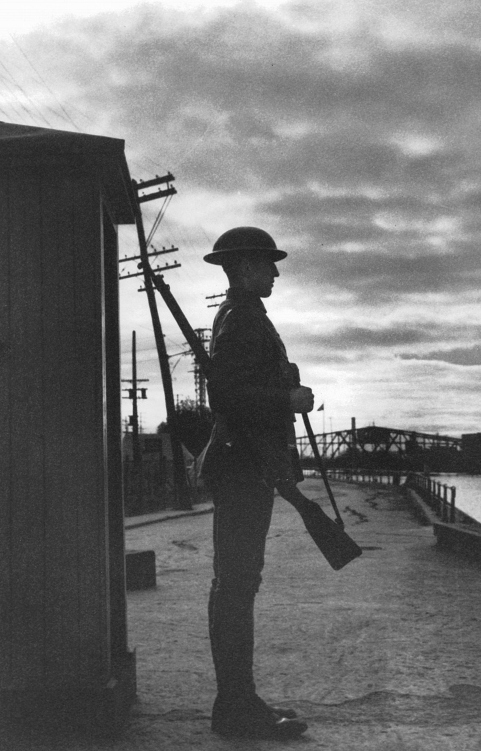
A soldier guarding the canal during wartime in 1939

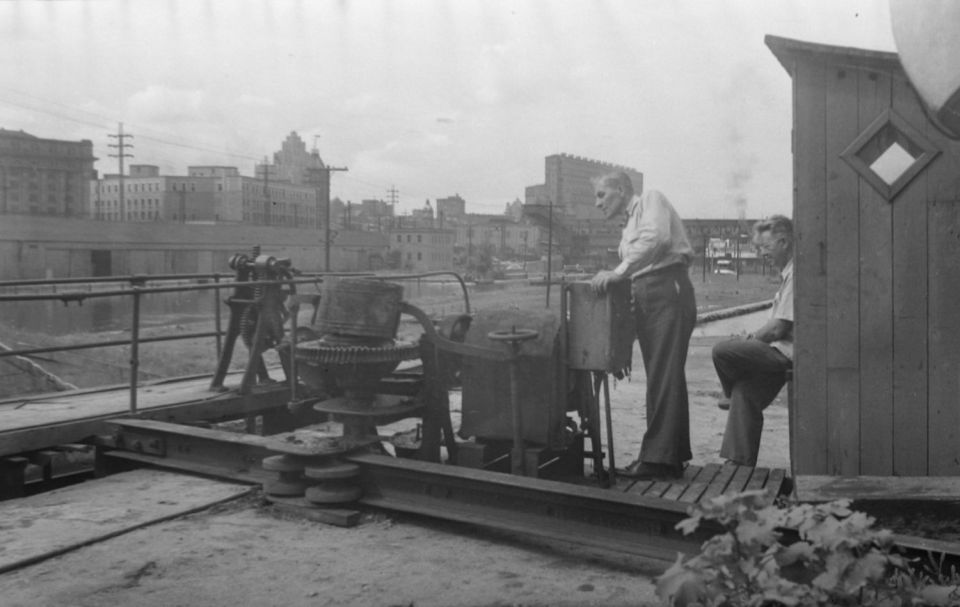
Doors opening a lock. Lachine Canal, August 7, 1948.

The impact of the Lachine Canal on Montreal during the mid- to late 1800s can be seen through the emergence of new working-class neighbourhoods such as Griffintown, St Henri, Pointe St Charles. Furthermore, the population of Montreal grew by over four times between the mid-1800s to the early 1900s.

One of the main reasons behind the growth of the Lachine Canal region was the access to hydraulic power which was provided through the deepening of canal in the 1840s. Throughout the mid to late 1800s, industries all along the banks of canal experienced consistent growth through the access to this energy source. By the end of the 1800s, factories began to utilize steam powered factories as opposed to hydraulic power.

The top three manufacturing industries in Montreal were wood, iron, and steel. In 1871 these three sectors made up 60% of the total Canadian manufacturing production. Other industries that had factories along the canal were the leather industries and the garment industries, which apart from the leather industry all increased. Sugarcane imported by Redpath from the West Indies also played a pivotal role in transforming Montreal into an industrial hub in North America.

As wood was on the decline and industries were growing at a much faster pace, iron and steel were still the dominant industries. By World War II, industries needed more water to power their machines, and the hydraulic system was not providing enough power. Many of the factories needed another source of power. The new source of power came from coal. With the Grand Trunk Railway on hand at Point St. Charles, industries were able to import coal from many different sources. They were able to import coal from Nova Scotia, Ohio, Pennsylvania, and across the ocean from Great Britain. The Lachine Canal was extremely busy acting as a hub for the city of Montreal.

Although this switch did not initially affect the Lachine Canal region in a negative manner, factories were no longer dependent on the canal as an energy source. Industries now had the option of building further and further away from the canal itself, which was also helped by the development of a railway system throughout Montreal's industrial region.

However, while the Lachine Canal proved an enormous boon for Montreal and the Province of Quebec, time would show that for Canada's Maritime Provinces, it was the first major nail in that region's economic coffin. The first enlargements took place between 1843 and 1848, under the supervision of Alfred Barrett. Five new locks, each 61 metres (200 ft) long, 13.5 metres (44 ft) wide and 2.7 metres (8.9 ft) deep replaced the original seven locks. A second enlargement of the canal took place between 1873 and 1885, at which time the locks were lengthened to 82 metres (269 ft) and deepened to 4.3 metres (14 ft).

The main reason for the second enlargement came from complaints from industrialists who wanted more power generated from the canal. They complained about the speed of the current being too slow. The second enlargement was meant to fix these problems.

Soon after the opening of the Lachine Canal in 1825, many of Montreal's merchants convinced the city's government to set up a harbour commission. One of the presidents of the harbour commission was John Young. Under Young's orders the canal was deepened so that the canal would be able to have bigger boats pass through.

Railway transportation proved to be very important for Montreal. The Grand Trunk Railway had its workshop in Point. St. Charles. This proved to be very important for the Lachine Canal because its workshop in Point St. Charles provided a link to the Atlantic during the winter months. It was the door to the rest of the Grand Trunk railway line that went from Toronto to Maine. Because the Lachine Canal was the link between the ocean and the interior of Canada and America, it was a major centre for transportation.

The canal continued to operate successfully until around 1950, but then, surrounded by the industrial developments which it helped to create, it could not be expanded further to cope with the continuing increase in vessel size. The canal became obsolete in 1959, being replaced by the St. Lawrence Seaway, which opened that year. The canal was finally closed to shipping in 1970. The opening of the Seaway and the decline of shipping on the canal led to the devastation of the neighbourhoods that lined the canal in Montreal's Le Sud-Ouest borough due to shifting patterns of industrial development and shipping.

The lower section of the Lachine canal was entirely filled in between 1965 and 1967 and closed to commercial navigation in 1970 and reopened to pleasure craft in 2002.

== Current canal ==
The current canal has a guaranteed draught of 2 metres (6 ft 7 in) and the clearance under bridges is 2.43 metres (8 ft 0 in).

== Locks ==
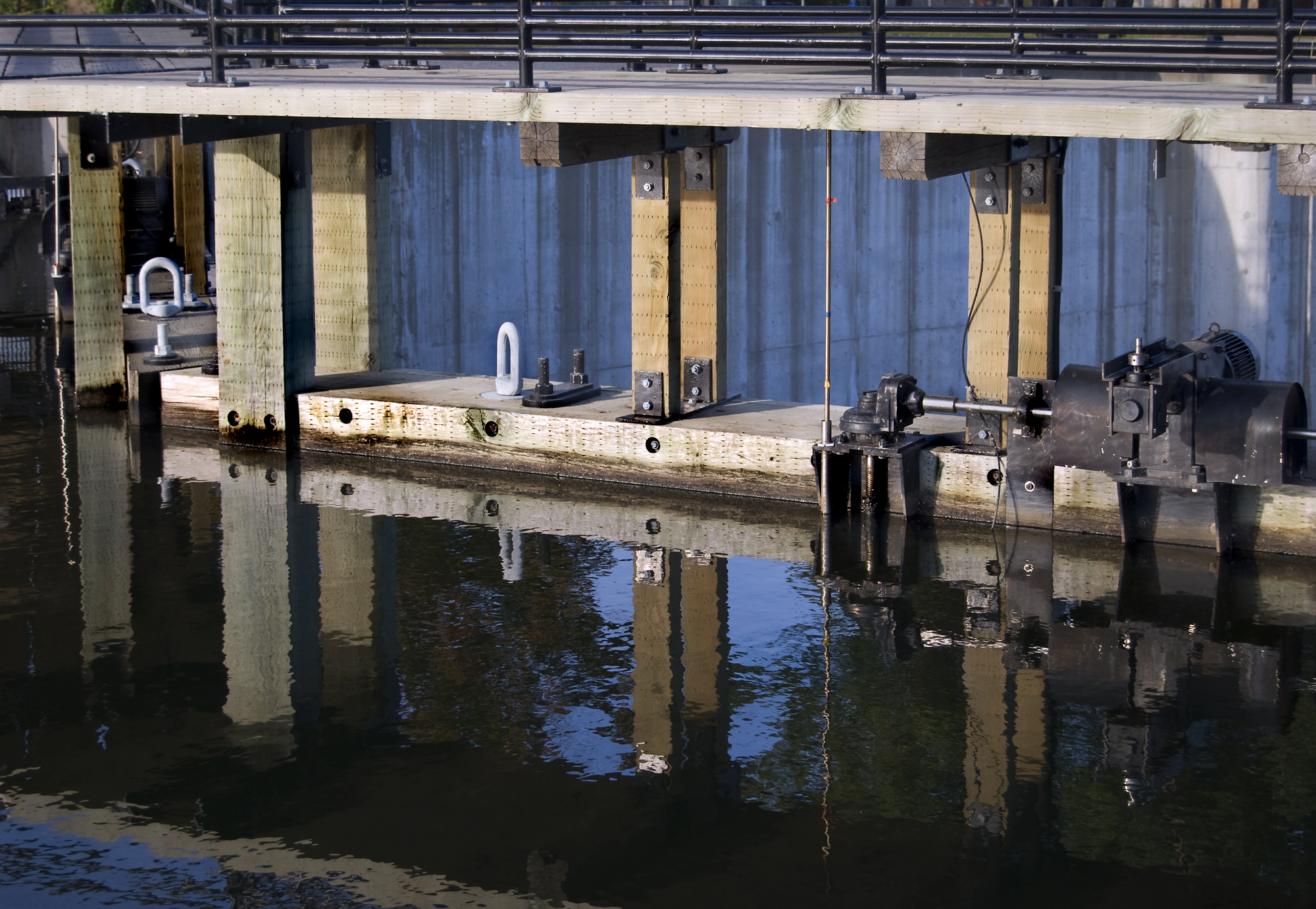
Close up view of locks

Since 1848, the canal has had 5 locks: Lachine, Côte-Saint-Paul, Saint-Gabriel and 2 locks at Old Port of Montreal. But initially it had seven locks:

- Lachine (1 lock),
- Côte-Saint-Paul (2 locks in 1825, 1 since 1848)
- Saint-Gabriel (1 lock)
- Old Port of Montreal (3 locks in 1825, 2 since 1848).

== Lachine Canal National Historic Site ==
The canal has been designated as a National Historic Site of Canada, officially named the Lachine Canal National Historic Site of Canada. The Fur Trade at Lachine National Historic Site is located near the western end of the canal.

== Development ==
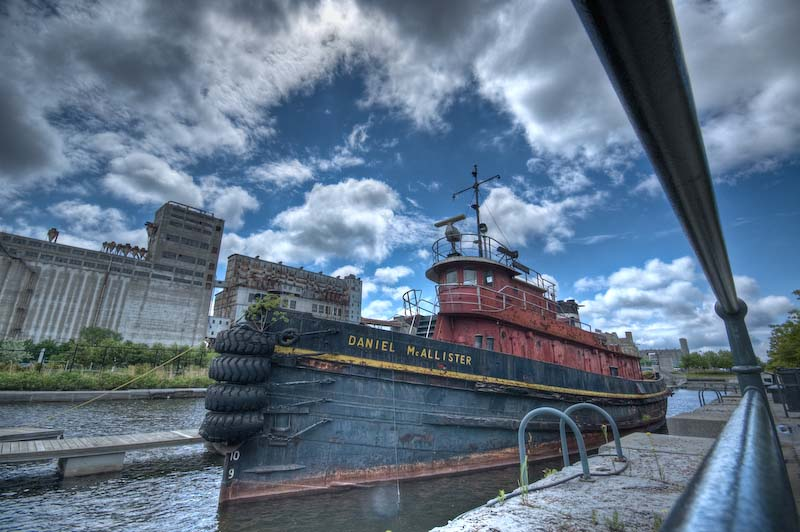
Tugboat Daniel McAllister, with grain elevators behind, Lachine Canal.

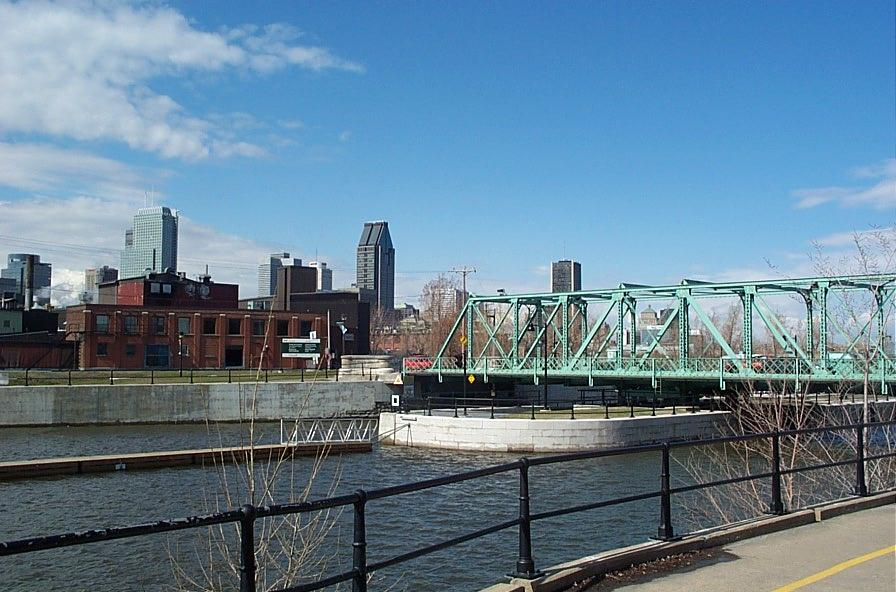
A bridge over the Lachine Canal, in sight of downtown Montreal

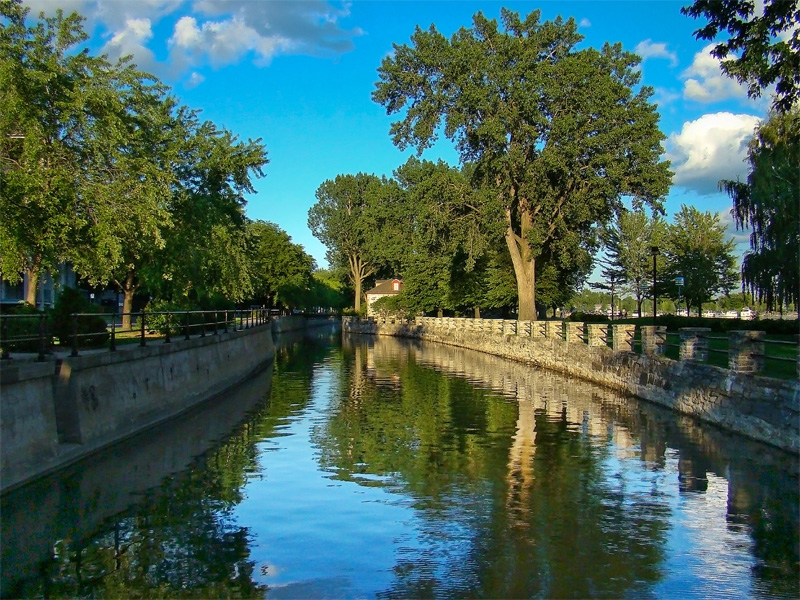
Lachine Canal

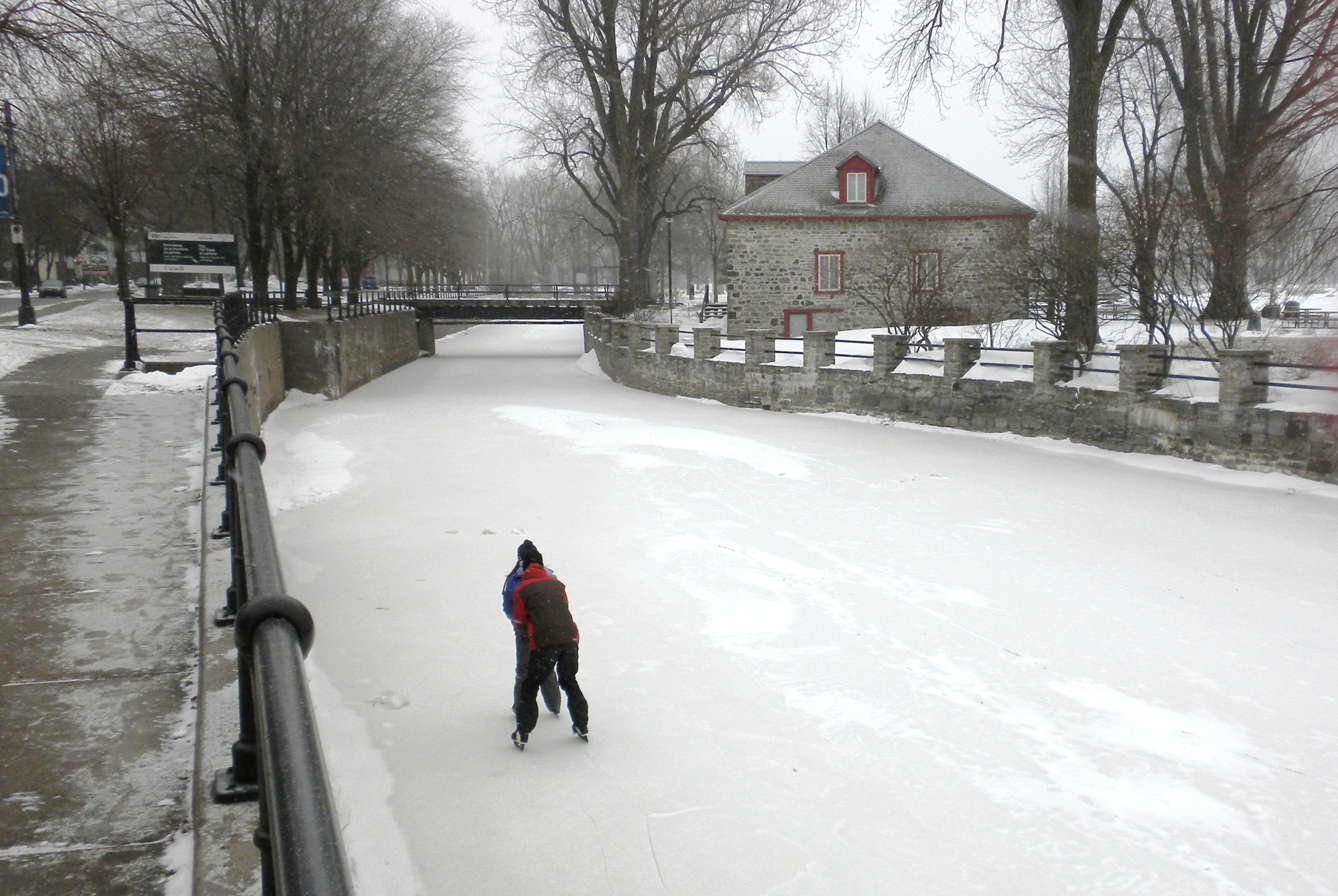
Two people skate on the frozen canal. (January 2011).

At its zenith from 1880 to 1940, the industrial and manufacturing area adjacent to the canal was once the largest in Canada in terms of both the number of firms and diversity of its output. At one time, over 20% of the workforce of the Island of Montreal was employed in its factories. Given its historic importance, the "Lachine Canal Manufacturing Complex" was designated a National Historic Site of Canada in 1996, in addition to the designation already enjoyed by the canal itself.

The Lachine Canal fell victim to deindustrialization. Many of the factories that lined the Lachine Canal were torn down and replaced by houses and apartments. By 1990 there was the feeling that the area's industrial history was being forgotten. In response, the Historic Sites and Monuments Board named the Lachine Canal "Lachine Canal Manufacturing Complex". The area was renovated after Parks Canada took over the Administration.

Atwater Market was built as a public works project during the depression era. The site was originally the William Rutherford lumberyard. The building has served many purposes, but it has been a market since 1982.

Over the last two decades, the canal has seen a large increase in residential and commercial development. In what was originally a very heavy industrial neighbourhood, Pointe-Saint-Charles and Saint-Henri have become very up-and-coming districts. House values have skyrocketed and many real estate developers have turned the century-old industrial factories and warehouses, like that of Dominion Textiles (5524 Saint-Patrick, now Complexe Dompark) & Simmons Bedding Company (4710 St-Ambroise, now Complexe Canal Lachine) into loft buildings. Complexe Dompark recently celebrated its 100th anniversary and now houses more than 90 multimedia, fashion, publishing and service industry-based companies in custom designed lofts. The area around the Atwater Market has become one of Montreal's most desirable residential areas for condo owners. Much of this is thanks to the continued effort to clean up the Canal.

The old Redpath Sugar refinery at the corner of Saint Patrick Street and Rue de Montmorency is now partially Lofts Redpath, converted after being abandoned since 1980.

== Recreation ==
The Lachine Canal became obsolete when the St. Lawrence Seaway opened up. The last of the industries still using the Canal system ended in 1970.

Managed by Parks Canada, the Lachine Canal reopened in 2002 as a pleasure boating area. They offer a wide array of activities such as kayaking, canoeing, paddleboarding and initiation to camping. A bike path also runs along the entire canal, which in 2009, placed third on Time Magazine's list of the top 10 urban bike paths in the world.

== Crossings ==
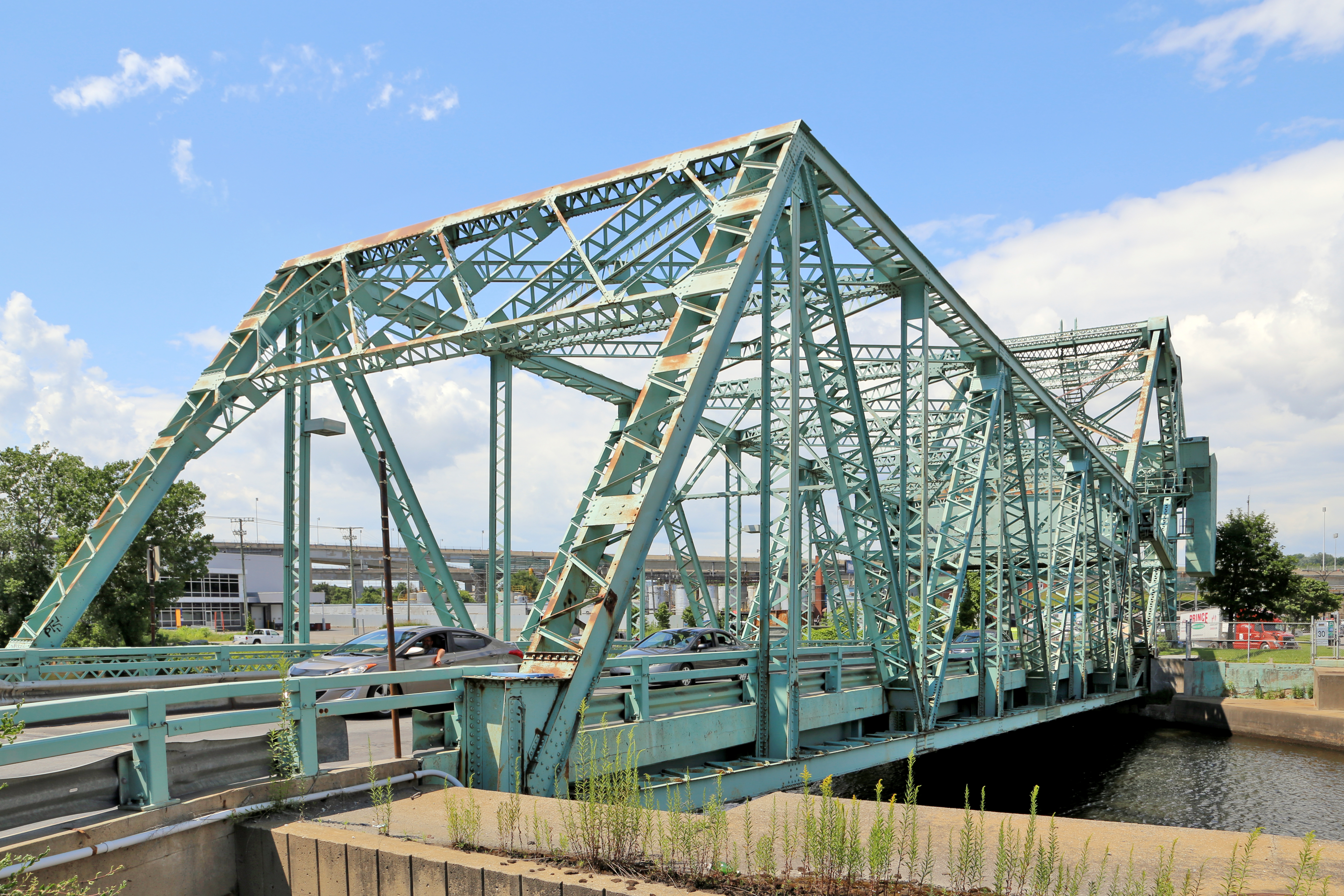
The Gauron Bridge, a single-leaf bascule bridge built in 1912

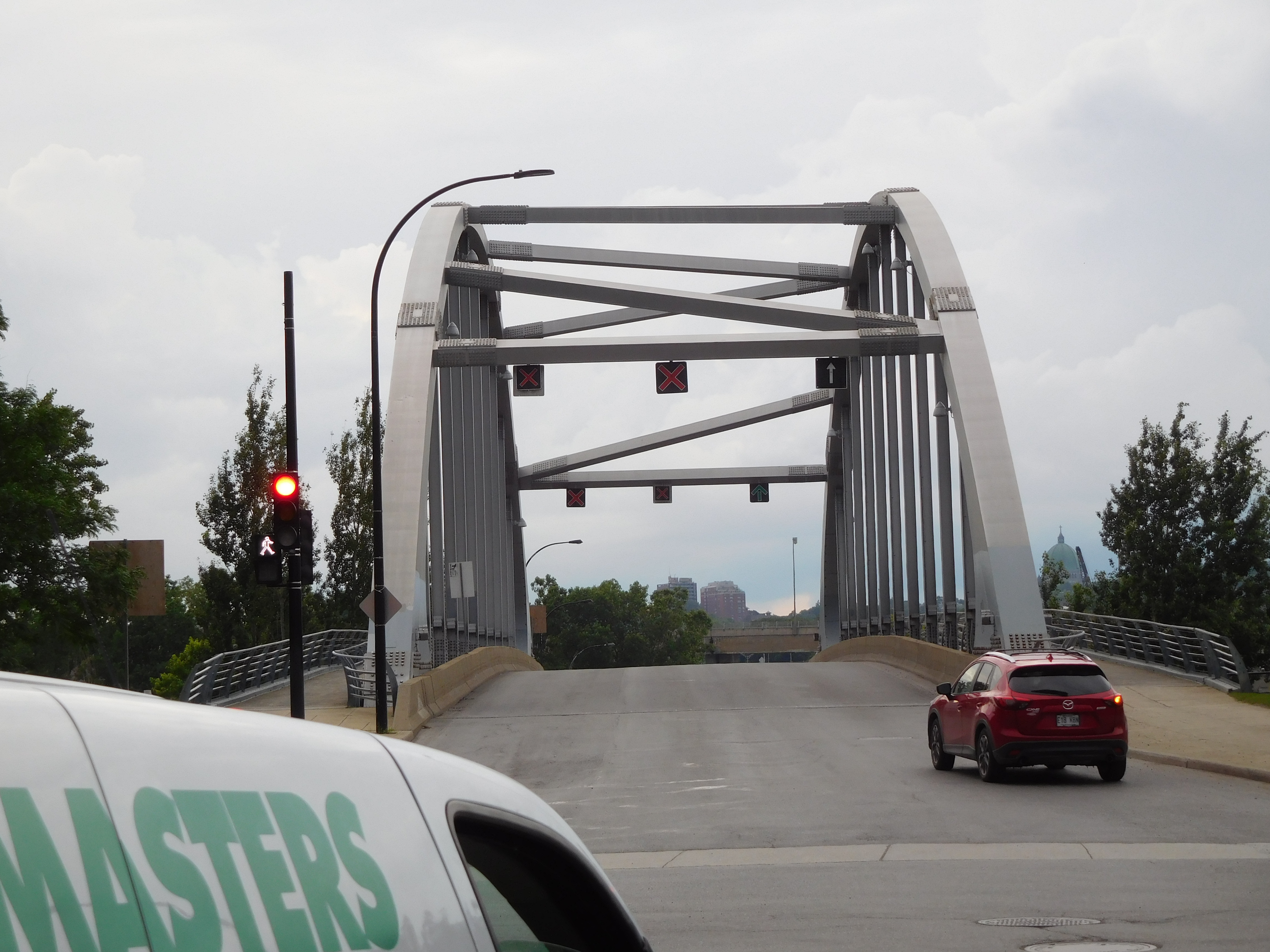
Monk Boulevard Bridge

From east (harbor) to west (Lac Saint-Louis):

- Canadian National (railway access to Port of Montreal)
- Rue Mill
- Autoroute 10
- Canadian National (railway access to Central Station)
- Rue Wellington (with the closed Wellington road tunnel underneath)
- Rue Des Seigneurs
- Rue Charlevoix
  - Metro Line 1 (Green) subway tunnel under Rue Charlevoix
- Avenue Atwater (pedestrian)
- Avenue Atwater (tunnel)
- Canadian National (railway main line)
- Rue Beaudoin (pedestrian)
- Rue Saint Rémi (tunnel)
- Autoroute 15/Autoroute 20
- Côte Saint Paul (pedestrian/cycle)
- Boulevard Monk
- Halte Notre-Dame park (pedestrian)
- Boulevard Angrignon
- Rue Senkus (pedestrian)
- Pont Lafleur and Pont Gauron (adjacent; carrying Avenue Dollard/Boulevard Saint Pierre)
- Route 138
- Canadian Pacific/ Rockfield Bridge (railway main line)
- Chemin du Musée
- Chemin des Iroquois (crosses one lock only)

== See also ==
- Canal de l'Aqueduc
- Grand Trunk Railway
- History of Montreal
- Montreal and Lachine Railroad
- Sainte-Anne-de-Bellevue Canal
- Society of the Priests of Saint Sulpice
