= Atwater Avenue =

Thoroughfare in Montreal, Canada

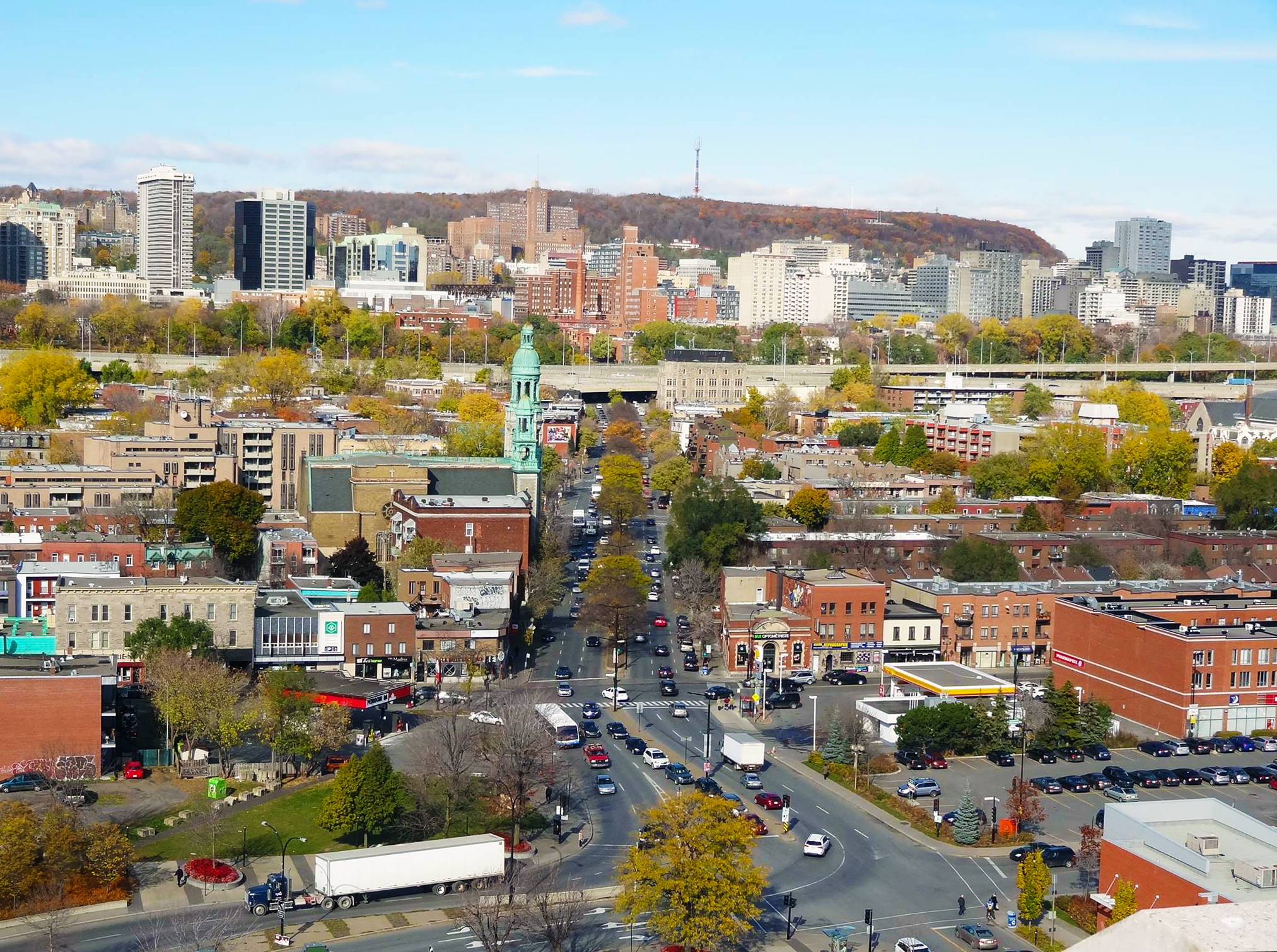
- Atwater Avenue looking north.
- Interactive map of Atwater Avenue
- Native name: avenue Atwater (French)
- Owner: City of Montreal
- Length: 3.1 km (1.9 mi)
- Location: Montreal
- Coordinates: 45.489737°N 73.585256°W
- South end: Henri Duhamel Street, Verdun
- Major junctions: A-15, A-20; R-138
- North end: Doctor Penfield Avenue, Ville-Marie

Construction
- Inauguration: 1871

Atwater Avenue (officially in French: avenue Atwater) is a major north–south street located in Montreal, Quebec, Canada. It links Doctor Penfield Avenue in the Ville-Marie borough to the north, and Henri Duhamel Street in the Verdun borough to the south. It is named for Edwin Atwater. The street runs through the Atwater Tunnel near the Atwater Market in Saint-Henri, before climbing and straddling the border of the city of Westmount.

The Montreal Forum, Place Alexis-Nihon, Dawson College, Atwater and Lionel-Groulx stations of the Montreal Metro, and the Atwater Market are located on this street. Below downtown Montreal, it runs through the Little Burgundy district and, by way of the Atwater Tunnel under the Lachine Canal, through the Pointe Saint-Charles district.

== History ==
Atwater Avenue owes its name to a local businessman and city councilor by the name of Edwin Atwater (1808-1874), who participated in the foundation of the Montreal City and District Savings Bank (later known as Laurentian Bank of Canada), and the Montreal Telegraph Company. It was in 1871, that Montreal City Council named the street after Atwater.
