= The Point (film) =

- Directed by: Joshua Dorsey
- Written by: Owen Coughlan; Joshua Dorsey; Alyssa Kuzmarov; Melissa Malkin
- Starring: Julie Chauvin, Satchel Babineau, Sabrina Law, John Morris
- Cinematography: Alain Julfayan
- Edited by: Maxime Chalifoux
- Distributed by: Silo Productions
- Release date: 2006
- Country: Canada
- Language: English
- Budget: $1 million

The Point is a 2006 film co-produced by Silo Productions and the National Film Board of Canada, filmed on location in Montreal. The movie, whose name is taken from the common name for one of the city's poorest neighbourhoods, Pointe-Saint-Charles, tells the story of a group of teenagers and how their lives intersect over the course of a weekend, with the story developed by teens, in workshops.

The Point was shot with a group of 40 teens from the neighbourhood, for a reported budget of $1 million. The film premiered at Festival du nouveau cinema, followed by screenings at the Rendez-vous du cinema quebecois and the Slamdance Film Festival.

== See also ==
- Docufiction
- List of docufiction films
