= Edwin Atwater =

Canadian businessman and politician (1808–1874)

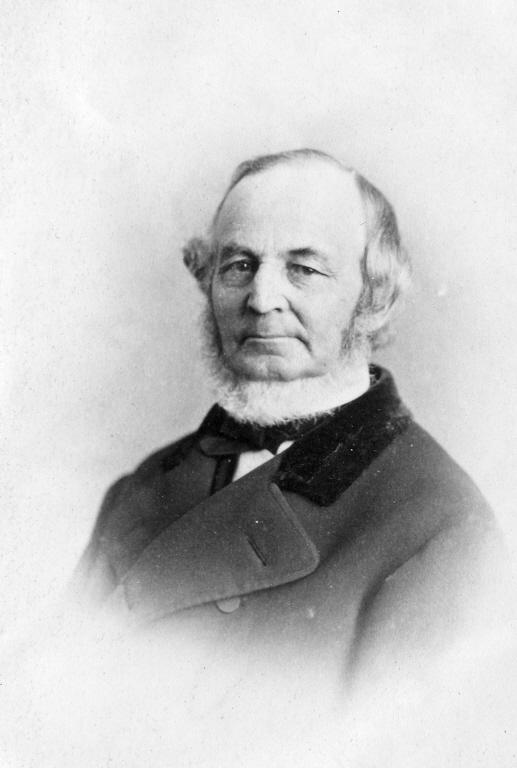
Edwin Atwater, photographed by William Notman in 1868

Edwin Atwater (September 14, 1808 – June 18, 1874) was a Canadian businessman, corporate director and municipal politician in Montreal. He started a business dealing paints, varnish and plate-glass, and was the first business to import glass into Canada. He served on the jury for the murder trial of François Jalbert, accused of murdering a British officer during the Lower Canada Rebellion. The jury acquitted Jalbert, in spite of strong public opinion by the anglophone community in favour of a guilty verdict.

In 1846 he was a founder of the Montreal City and District Savings Bank, which continues in business today as the Laurentian Bank of Canada. He held various positions in the company. He was elected as a councillor to the Montreal City Council in 1850, and two years later was elected as an alderman to the same council. His focus as an elective representative was to improve the city's water infrastructure. In 1861 he was president of the Montreal Board of Trade and continued participating in business ventures in the Montreal area. In 1871 Montreal named a street after him in the ward that he represented on city council. Since then, the Atwater Library, Atwater Market, and Atwater station have also been named for him.

== Early life and business ==
Atwater was born on September 14, 1808, in Williston, Vermont. His father was Linus Atwater.

Atwater immigrated to Lower Canada in 1830, settling in Montreal and working as a sign and house painter. He then started a business dealing in paints, varnish and plate-glass with his brother, Albert; they would become the first people to import glass into Canada.

In 1838 Atwater was a juror in the trial of François Jalbert, who was accused of murdering a British officer named George Weir during the Lower Canada Rebellion. Although there was public pressure from the anglophone community to convict Jalbert, Atwater and the jury voted for his acquittal. After the trial, police had to escort the jury out of the courtroom while they were attacked by anglophone members of the public.

In 1845 he joined Frederick Smith and William Henry Watkins Jr. to create Canada Glass Works, which opened a glass factory in Dorchester, Canada East. This was the first known window glass factory in Canada. Atwater's focus in the company was to distribute the company's products.

In 1846, Ignace Bourget, a Roman Catholic bishop in Montreal, wanted to start a bank in the city that would allow people to deposit small amounts of money and would be less likely to fail. Bourget invited high-profile businessmen in the city, including Atwater, to help create the bank and serve on its Honorary Board of Directors, even though Atwater was a Presbyterian. This bank was founded as the Montreal City and District Savings Bank, which continues in business today as the Laurentian Bank of Canada. In the same year he co-founded the Montreal Telegraph Company, the city's first telegraph service. In 1849 he co-founded the Montreal and Troy Telegraph Company.

== Political life ==
Atwater was elected as a councillor for the Montreal City Council in 1850, representing the ward Saint-Antoine. Two years later he was elected as an alderman for the same ward, and remained in that role until 1857. A motivating factor for his transition to politics was to modernise the water system of Montreal. While on council he was president of the aqueduct commission and began work on improving the city's water infrastructure. He convinced the council to hire Thomas Keefer to undertake this work. Atwater did not oppose government investment into water infrastructure because he felt it would increase economic development in the city. However, he worked to improve the finances of the city, which in previous years had decreased. In 1865, he represented Montreal as a delegate at an assembly of municipalities in Detroit, United States.

== Later business career ==
From 1859 to 1861, Atwater served as president of the Montreal City and District Bank. In 1866, many depositors of the bank feared a Fenian invasion from the United States would put their money at risk. This put the bank's finances at risk as much of its capital was client deposits. The bank's directors appointed Atwater to a three-person committee to create a plan to ensure that clients would continue to be able to withdraw their money.

He served as president of the Montreal Board of Trade and ex officio member of the Harbor Commission in 1861. In 1861 he donated money to McGill University to help them purchase a copy of The Birds of America. He was one of the co-founders of the Merchants' Bank, sat on their board of directors and became vice-president. He was also vice-president and a board member for the Citizens' Insurance Company of Canada.

In 1866, Atwater built a family home on a double lot in Westmount. The house was two stories and made out of greystone. In 1872, Atwater purchased $2000 worth of stocks in the Montreal Colonization Railway, joining other businessmen with investing into the company. The goal of the railway was to increase the transport of goods from the Ottawa Valley to Montreal, thereby reinforcing the city's status as a hub of commercial activity. The railway was also to be a competitor to the Grand Trunk Railway.

== Personal life, death and legacy ==
Atwater was a member of the American Presbyterian Church. He married Lucy Huntington Greene on May 23, 1833. They had eight children, four daughters and four sons. The City of Montreal named Atwater Avenue after him in 1871 in the Saint-Antoine ward that he represented as a municipal councillor. Atwater Library, Atwater Market, and Atwater station are also named for him and located on Atwater Avenue. He died on June 18, 1874, after being ill for several weeks.
