= Pointe-Saint-Charles =

- Neighbourhood
- Location of Pointe-Saint-Charles in Montreal
- Coordinates: 45°28′52.3″N 73°33′11.2″W
- Country: Canada
- Province: Quebec
- City: Montreal
- Borough: Le Sud-Ouest
- Established: 1668

Population (2011)
  - Total: 13,731
- Postal Code: H3K
- Area codes: 514, 438

Pointe-Saint-Charles (French pronunciation: [pwɛ̃t sɛ̃ ʃaʁl]; also known in English as Point Saint Charles, and locally as The Point, or "PSC") is a neighbourhood in the borough of Le Sud-Ouest in the city of Montreal, Quebec, Canada. Historically a working-class area, the creation of many new housing units, the recycling of industrial buildings into business incubators, lofts, and condos, the 2002 re-opening of the Lachine canal as a recreation and tourism area, the improvement of public spaces, and heritage enhancement have all helped transform the neighbourhood and attract new residents. Community groups continue to be pro-active in areas related to the fight against poverty and the improvement of living conditions.

== History ==
Twenty years after the founding of Ville-Marie (Montreal) by Paul Chomedey, Sieur de Maisonneuve in 1642, he granted an area on the pointe Saint-Charles, extending into the St. Lawrence, to St. Marguerite Bourgeoys for agricultural use by the Congrégation de Notre-Dame. The sisters operated a sharecropping farm (métairie) on the land. From an area of about 30 arpents (about 10 hectares), the farm reached an area of 200 arpents (about 68 hectares) by the mid-18th century. The nuns built the Maison Saint-Gabriel, the only remaining trace of their farm and one of the oldest buildings in Montreal, on their property in 1698. Their farming activity only ceased altogether in the 1950s.

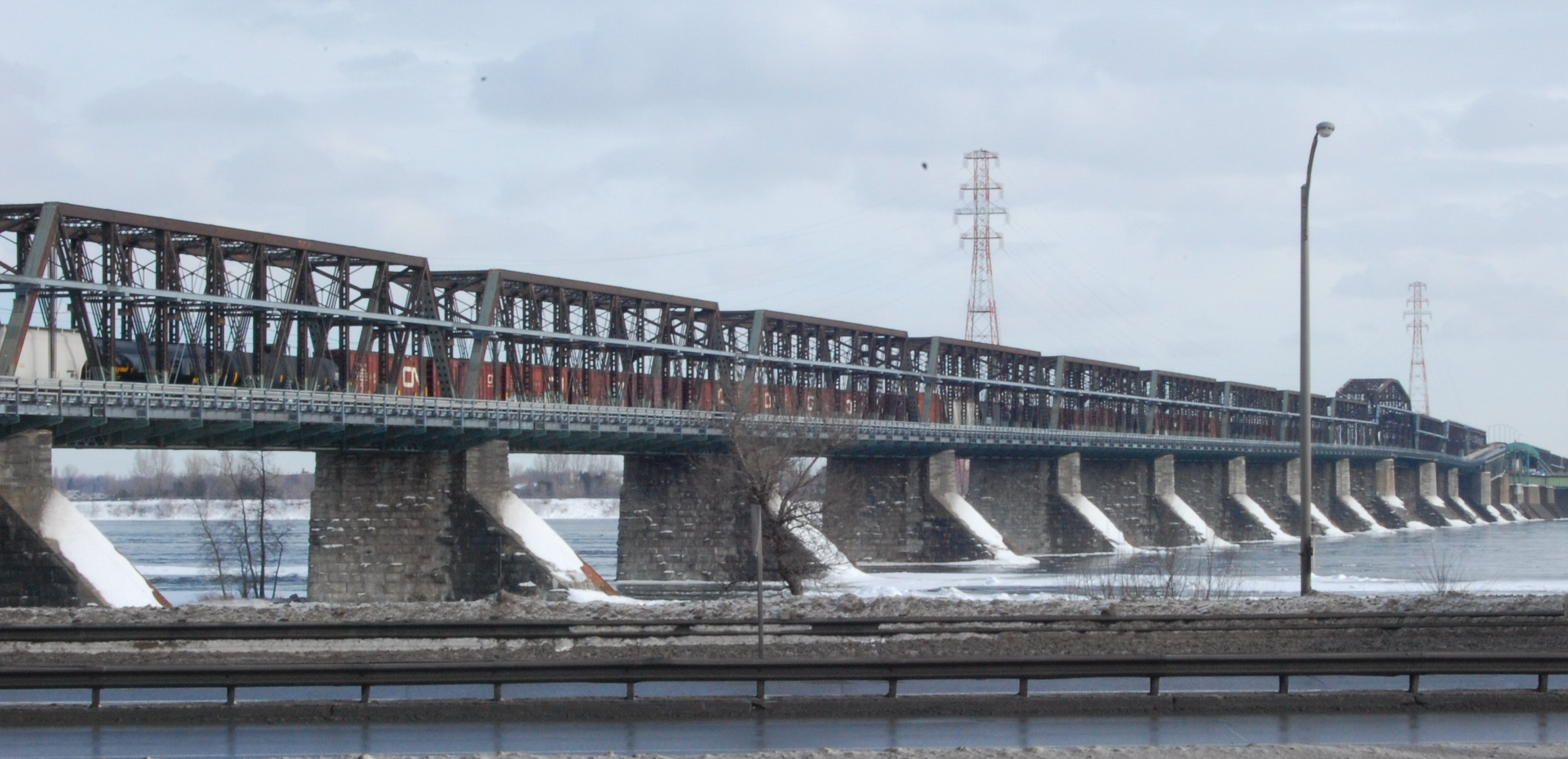
Victoria Bridge over St. Lawrence River

Until the mid-19th century, the area was chiefly agricultural. Urbanization began with the enlargement of the Lachine Canal (completed in 1848), as the transportation access and water power attracted industry to the whole of what is now the Sud-Ouest borough. The installation of railways and the construction of the Victoria Bridge (1854–1860) also attracted workers and spurred development. The then-owners, the Sulpician Order, divided the area into lots and auctioned them off starting in 1853, with the Grand Trunk Railway purchasing a large area for use as a railyard.

Numerous workers moved in, including numerous Irish immigrants as well as French-Canadians, English, Scots and in the early 20th century, the Poles, Ukrainians and the Lithuanians. Irish-Catholics and French-Canadians lived side by side in the Point, each community building its own Catholic church, also side by side on Centre Street: Saint Gabriel's Parish (completed 1895) and Église Saint-Charles (completed 1905). The Polish Community was given permission by the Archdiocese of Montreal to build a church on Centre Street between Richmond and Montmorency Streets, Holy Trinity Church, which is still attended by the community from near and far. The Ukrainian Community also still returns to the Point to worship at Holy Ghost Parish on the corner of Grand Trunk and Shearer Streets. Numerous Protestant churches were also built during the late 1800s including Grace Anglican Church (built 1871 enlarged 1892), St. Mathew Presbyterian Church (built 1891, destroyed by fire in 1977), Centenary Methodist Church (built 1891, now a Seventh-Day Adventist church), and a Baptist church at the corner of Liverpool and Wellington streets (built 1900 and now used as a Sikh temple). Today, Pointe-Saint-Charles is considered the heart of historic Irish Montreal, with street names like Rue Saint-Patrick, Rue d'Hibernia, Place Dublin, and Rue des Irlandais testifying to that heritage.

By the 1860s, the area was a busy industrial neighbourhood and one of Canada's first neighbourhoods offering housing to industrial workers. Notably, the development on Grand Trunk Row (today Rue Sébastopol) introduced the stacked "duplex," based on British working-class housing, that would come to be so typical of neighbourhoods throughout Montreal. Building continued in the central Rushbrooke/Hibernia area until 1910.

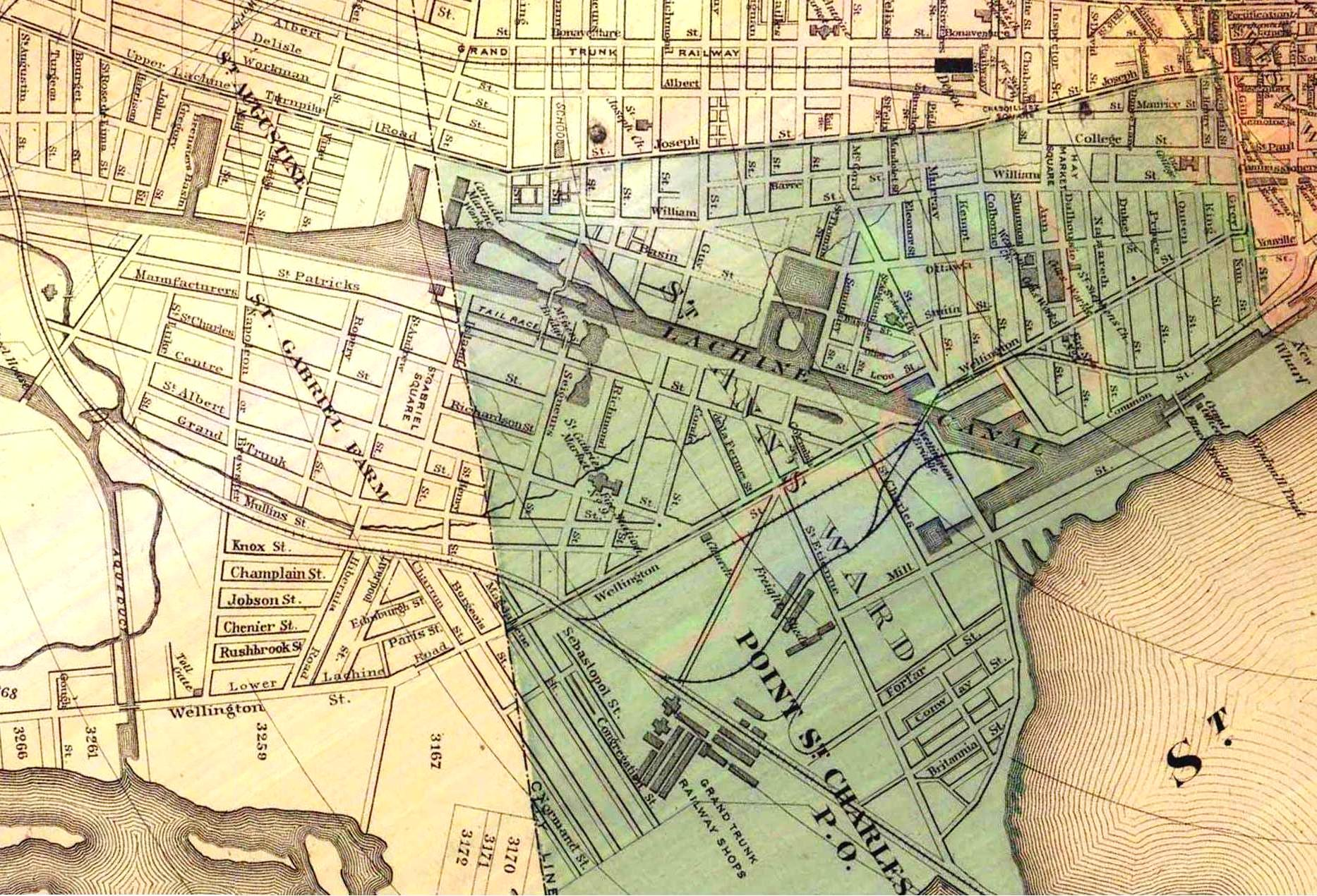
Pointe St-Charles in 1859, showing the Montreal ward of St. Ann and the area outside the city limits

The area straddled the Montreal city limit, and the part outside was set up as the village of Saint-Gabriel in 1874 and annexed to Montreal in 1887, becoming a city ward. In the early 20th century, Pointe-Saint-Charles was made up of two city wards: St. Gabriel, to the west, and St. Ann, to the east, which also included Griffintown and extended as far as McGill Street in what is now Old Montreal. The two were divided by the former city limit line, passing from the basin on the Lachine Canal just west of the St. Gabriel Locks to the riverbank just south of what is now the end of Ash Avenue.

Like the rest of the area around the Lachine Canal, the neighbourhood went into a long decline in the 1960s, caused by the opening of the St. Lawrence Seaway and sealed by the closure of the Lachine Canal. The destruction of Goose Village and the construction of the Bonaventure Autoroute further impacted the area. Still, the neighbourhood reacted to the difficult times by forming bands of social solidarity. For example, the Clinique communautaire de Pointe-Saint-Charles was founded in 1968 to offer health and social services to local residents; it inspired the CLSC model used throughout the province, while remaining an independent clinic with the mandate of a CLSC. Several social housing developments were built in the 1970s; today, some 40% of the housing stock in Pointe-Saint-Charles is social housing. The Montreal Metro reached Pointe-Saint-Charles in 1978 with the construction of Charlevoix station.

However, in recent years, the neighbourhood has undergone gentrification. The Montreal Technoparc industrial park opened in 1988 on the site of a former landfill and dump site between the neighbourhood and the river. The rehabilitation of the Lachine Canal for recreational use spurred the reclamation of factories along the canal for lofts and condominiums. However, this has brought its own pressures as to increased rents and cost of living. The tradition of social solidarity continues, with residents banding together in 2005–2006 to successfully oppose a project to move the Montreal Casino to the area.

== Geography ==
Located southwest of Downtown Montreal, it is bounded on the north by the Bonaventure Expressway, the east and southeast by the Saint Lawrence River, the southwest by the Décarie Expressway and Atwater Avenue, and the west and northwest by the Lachine Canal.

Adjacent neighbourhoods are Little Burgundy and Saint-Henri (across the canal to the north Montreal directions), Griffintown to the northeast, the wharves of the Old Port to the east, and the borough of Verdun to the west.

The residential part of the neighbourhood is bisected by the CN Rail line running through its centre on an elevated structure. A large industrial area, including the former CN rail yards, lies on landfill to the east; on the riverside, the Montreal Technoparc is home to film studios.

The point for which the area was named, located south of the modern area around Parc Le Ber, has long since disappeared under landfill. The name was reassigned to a new point at the southeastern tip of the area, opposite the northern point of Nuns' Island.

== Infrastructure ==
=== Transport ===
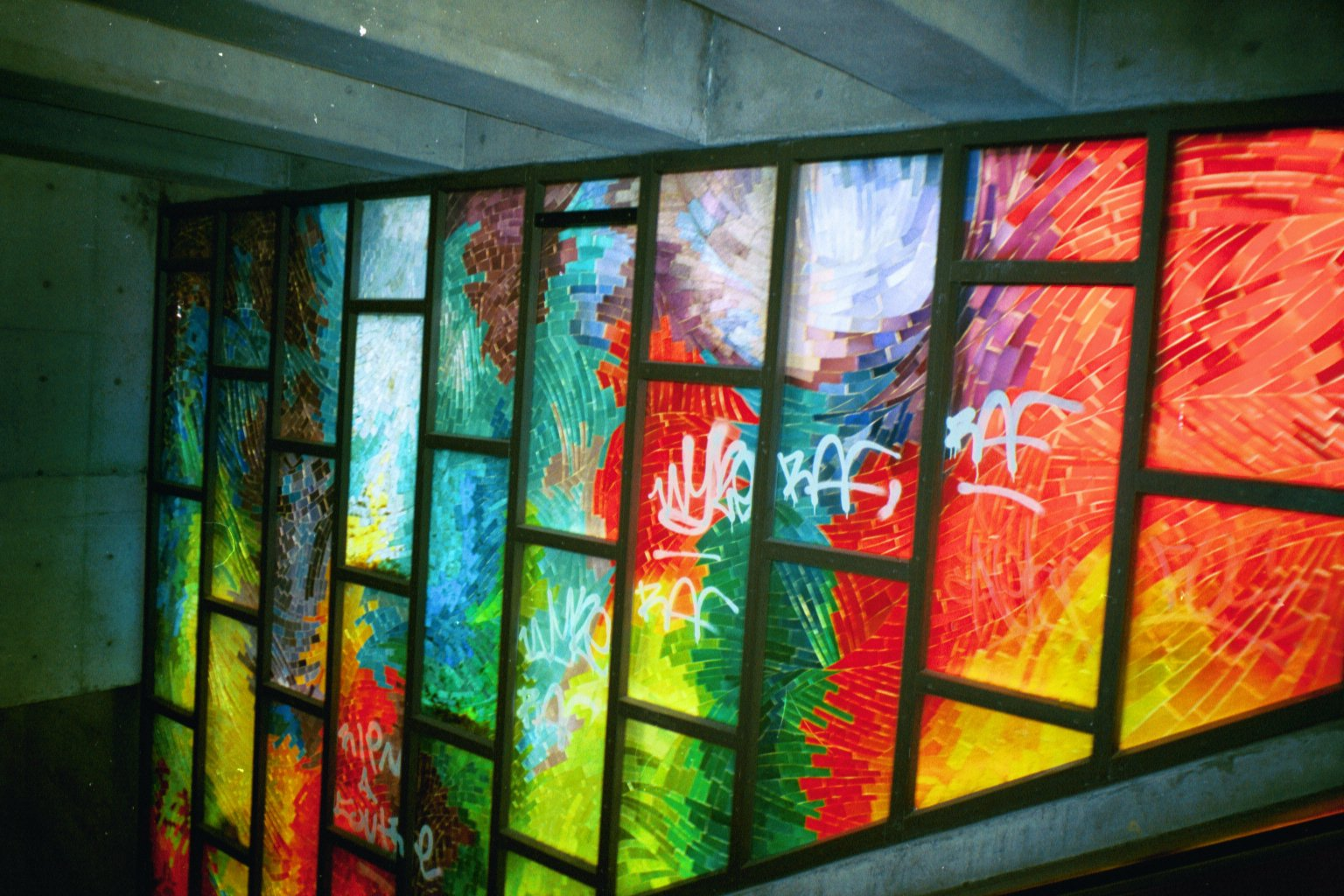
Charlevoix (Montreal Metro)

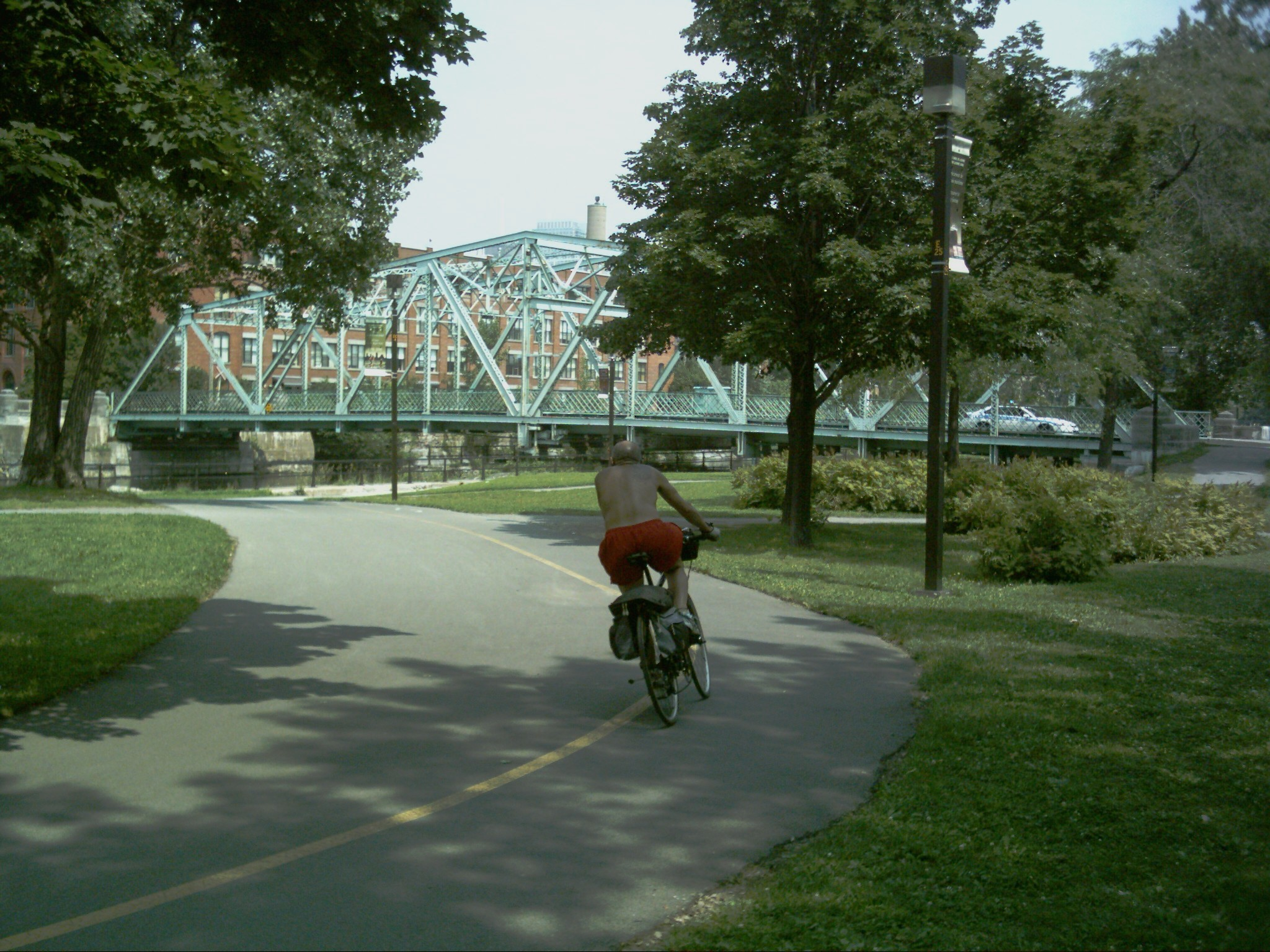
Charlevoix Bridge over the Lachine Canal between Little Burgundy and Pointe Saint-Charles

The neighbourhood is served by the Charlevoix metro station, with LaSalle station near the southwestern part of the neighbourhood in Verdun.

The area is ringed by the Décarie and Bonaventure Expressways, as well as Quebec Route 112 (Rue Bridge) leading to the Victoria Bridge. It is also the Montreal end of the Champlain Bridge complex (Île-des-Sœurs and Clément bridges) leading to Nuns' Island and the South Shore at Brossard. Major thoroughfares include Rue Saint-Patrick, Rue du Centre, Rue Wellington, and Rue Charlevoix.

The CN Rail, Via, and Amtrak lines to Montreal's Central Station run through Pointe-Saint-Charles. As of 2011, with the closure of the Turcot Yards, CN has been performing switching operations and storing trains in the area, a practice denounced by local residents due to increased noise and danger from hazardous cargo in a residential area.

=== Institutions ===
The Clinique communautaire de Pointe-Saint-Charles is the primary health and social services institution in the area. La Maison Saint-Charles provides space for community groups.

=== Culture and recreation ===
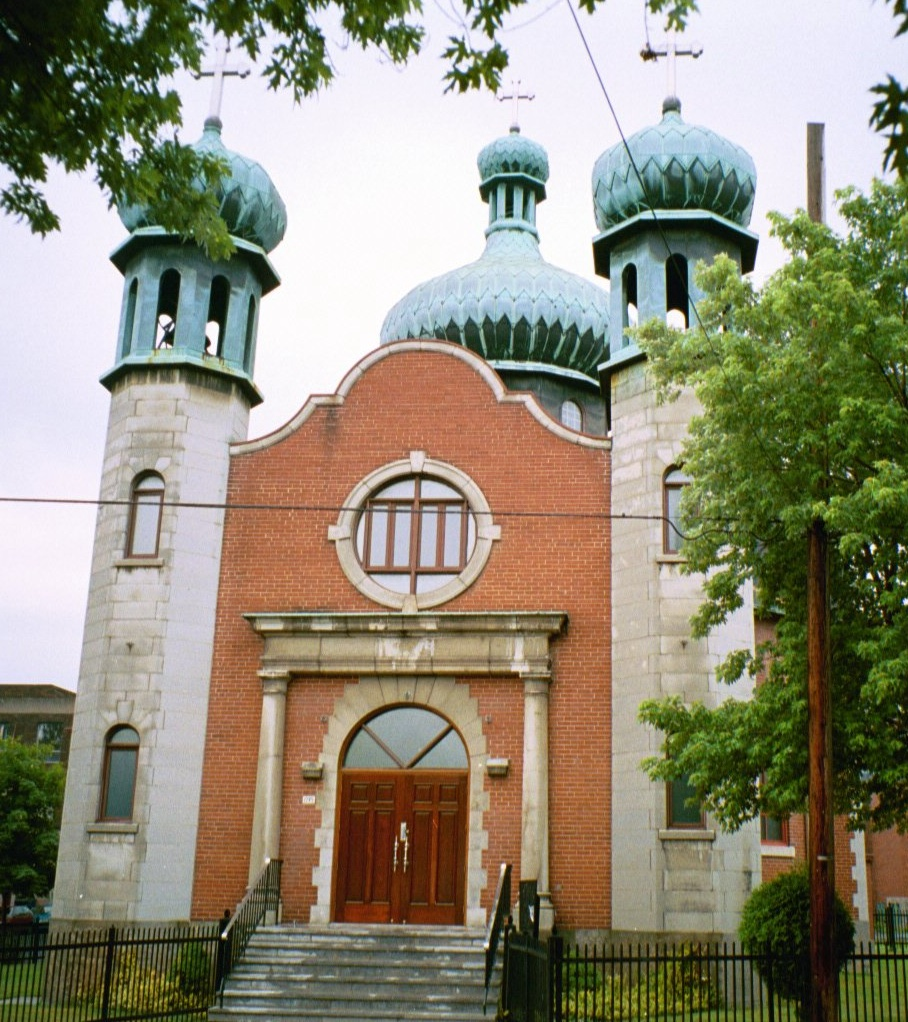
Holy Spirit Ukrainian Catholic church on 1795 Grand Trunk Avenue

Recreational facilities include the YMCA, the Centre Saint-Charles, Saint-Gabriel Park, Le Ber Park, Marguerite Bourgeoys Park, and the Lachine Canal greenspace and bike trail, as well as road bike trails crossing through the neighbourhood. Historic buildings include the Maison Saint-Gabriel and Saint-Gabriel and Saint-Charles churches. The neighbourhood is served by the Bibliothèque Saint-Charles.

Pointe-Saint-Charles served as the setting for the 2006 movie The Point, a drama that takes place over one weekend about the stories of thirty-five teenagers and a mystery that haunts their neighbourhood.

== Demographics ==
Home language (2011)

| Language | Population | Pct (%) |
|---|---|---|
| French | 7,220 | 54.5% |
| English | 4,025 | 30.4% |
| Both English and French | 245 | 1.8% |
| Non-Official languages | 1,365 | 10.3% |
| English and Non-Official language | 80 | 0.6% |
| English, French and Non-Official languages | 65 | 0.5% |
| French and Non-Official language | 235 | 1.7% |

== Notable people ==
- Norman Dawe (1898–1948), Canadian sports executive

== See also ==
- Charlevoix (Montreal Metro)
- Jeanne-Le Ber
- Bâtiment 7
- Le Sud-Ouest
