= Saint-Henri Church =

Église de Saint-Henri
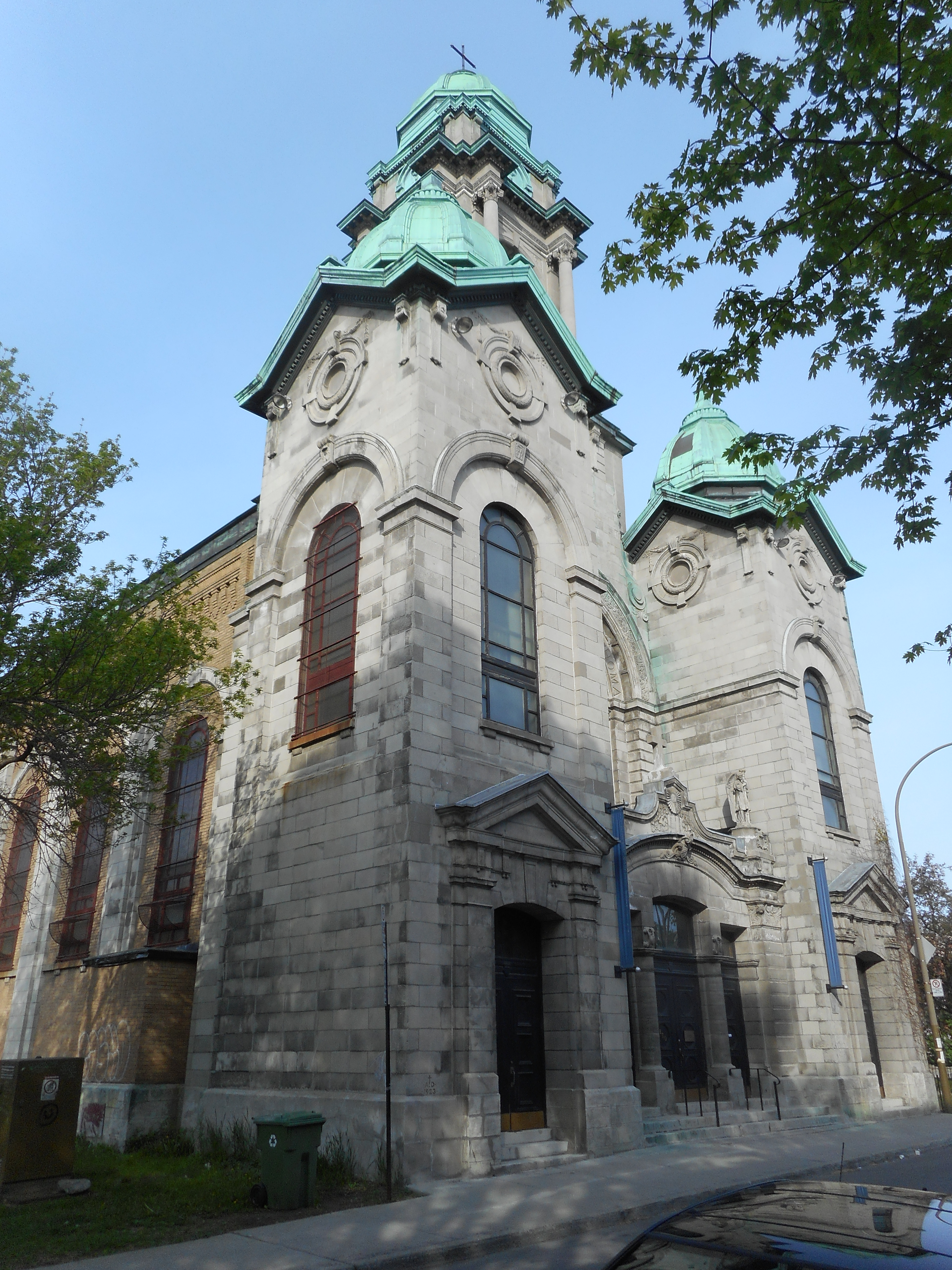
- Église de Saint-Henri
- 45°28′46.1″N 73°35′14″W
- Location: 872 du Covent Street, Saint-Henri, Le Sud-Ouest, Montreal, Quebec
- Country: Canada
- Denomination: Roman Catholic

History
- Former name: Saint Thomas Aquinas Church

Architecture
- Functional status: Inactive
- Architect: Joseph Albert Karch
- Style: Baroque
- Completed: 1923
- Closed: 2001

Specifications
- Materials: Stone, Brick

Administration
- Archdiocese: Montreal
- Parish: Saint-Henri Parish

Saint-Henri Church (French: Église de Saint-Henri) is a former Roman Catholic church in Montreal, Quebec, Canada. It is located at 872 du Couvent Street in the Saint-Henri neighbourhood of the Southwest borough.

== History ==
The Saint-Henri parish was established in 1867 following the division of the Notre-Dame parish. A church, Église de Saint-Henri, had been constructed in the Saint-Henri parish, however it was demolished in 1968 in order to construct École secondaire Saint-Henri in that location.

Saint Thomas Aquinas Church was constructed for the Irish community based on a design by architect Joseph Albert Karch. It opened in 1923. The church's main facade was constructed of stone, with the side walls constructed of brick.

The Saint-Henri parish church became the former Saint Thomas Aquinas Church, and was renamed Église de Saint-Henri in 1968.

The church closed altogether in 2001, becoming a community centre. It became the Hôtel des Encans (Iegor Auction House) in 2004.
