= Jacques Cartier Monument =

Jacques Cartier Monument is the English name of various monuments to the French explorer:

- Saint Henri Square, Montreal
- Cartier-Brébeuf National Historic Site, Quebec City
- George Bareau, sculptor, Saint-Malot, France
