= Musée des ondes Emile Berliner =

Museum located in Montreal, Canada

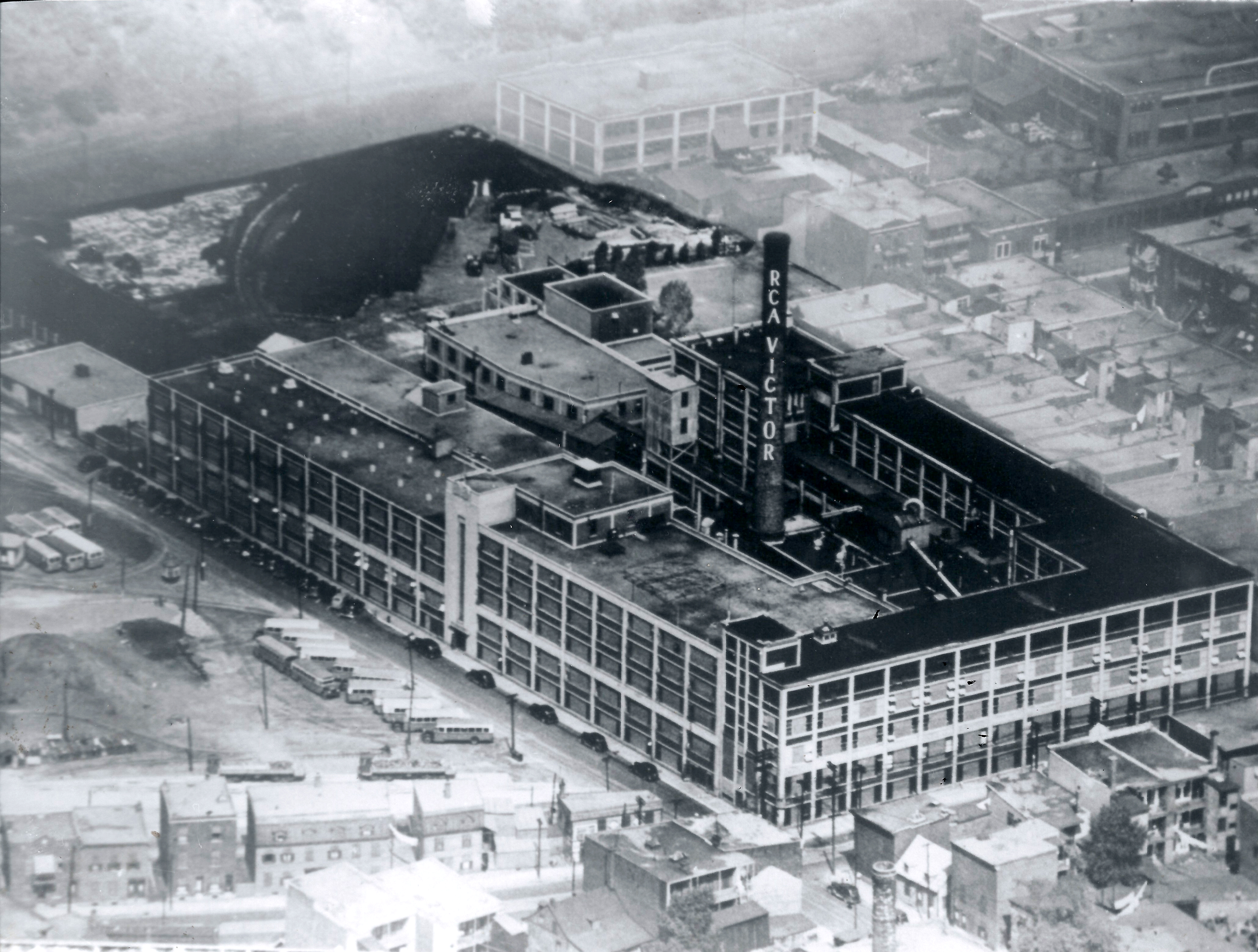
The Berliner Gramophone Factory after it became part of RCA Victor, after 1929

The Musée des ondes Emile Berliner is currently closed. It was a technical history museum in Montreal featuring exhibitions related to the development of music recording and broadcasting and subsequent industries, located in the historic factory of the Berliner Gram-o-phone Company in Montreal, Quebec, Canada. The museum received a Governor General History Award in 2020 for the Centennial of Broadcasting in Canada project together with the Société québécoise des collectionneurs de radios anciens (SQCRA). The museum has closed its doors to visitors in summer 2025 with no reopening date.

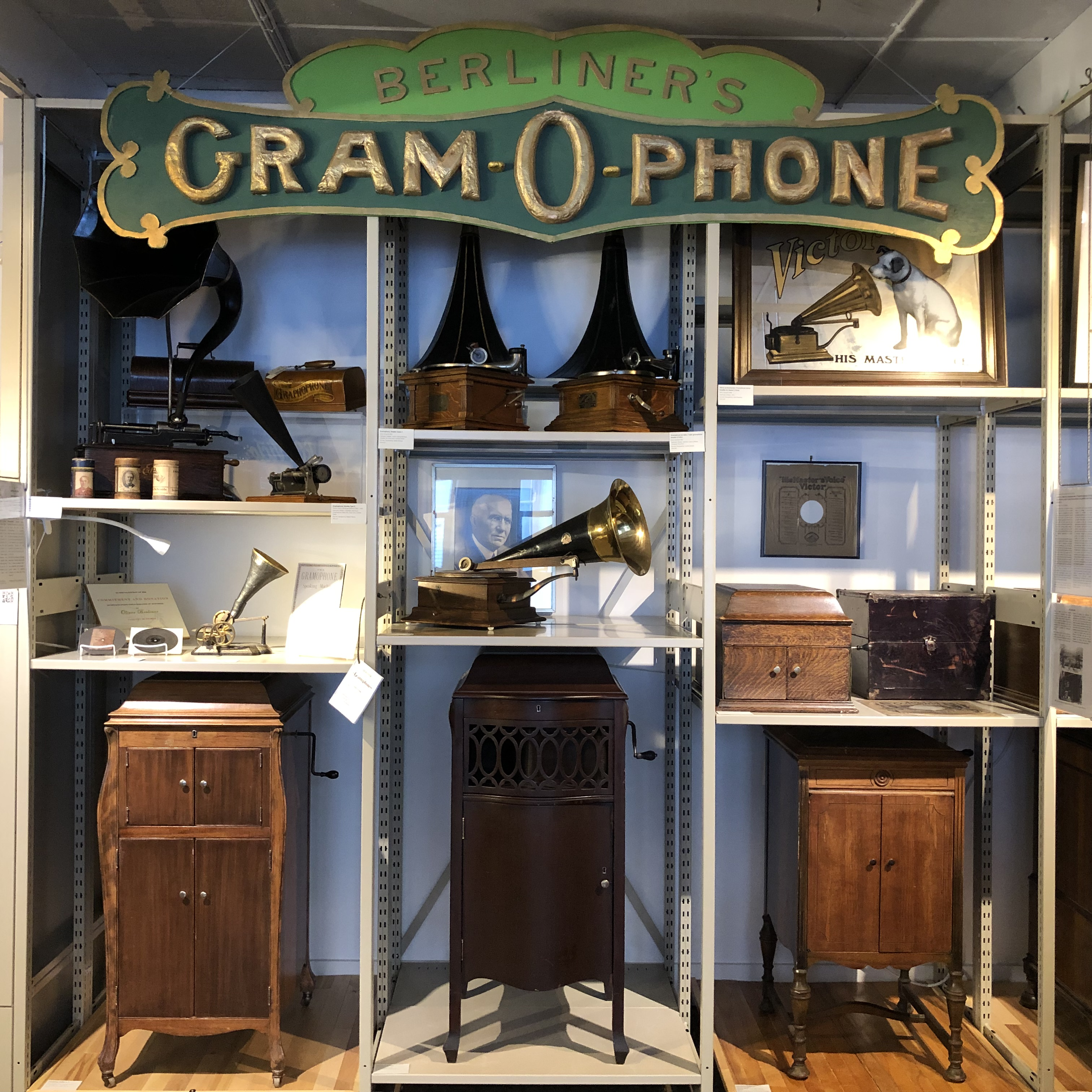
Phonographs and Gramophones in the permanent exhibition

== The Building ==
Since its construction in 1907, the factory on 1001 Lenoir street functioned as the world headquarters of the Berliner Gramophone Company. Emil Berliner invented the flat disc with a lateral cut, the gramophone and the recording system for lateral cut discs.

Emile Berliner moved his headquarters from Philadelphia in the United States to Montreal, Canada in 1900, after a legal battle surrounding the use of Berliner's trade name "Gramophone," withdrew his right to this trade name in the USA. He built his first own factory for the Berliner Gram-O-Phone Co. Montreal in 1907 on a property in Saint Henri, Montreal. In 1924, the Berliner Gram-O-Phone company merged with the Victor Talking Machine company of Camden.

After 1929, the factory became part of RCA Victor Canada. At the end of the 1950s, the first Canadian Satellite, the Alouette 1, was finalized here.

Around 1990, after RCA Victor moved to a new location in Sainte-Anne-de-Bellevue, the building was converted to a mixed-use office complex.

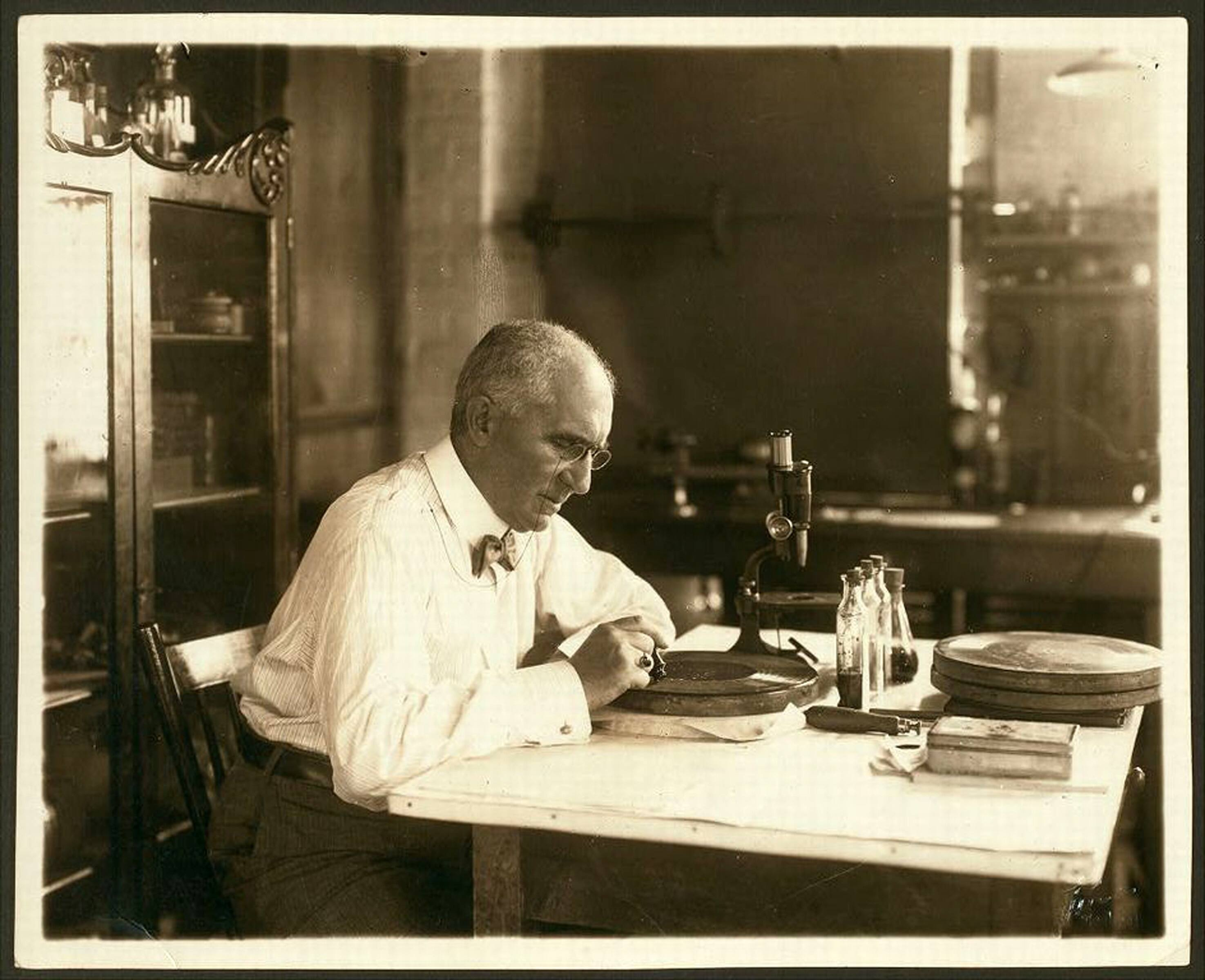
Inventor Emile Berliner around 1910

== The museum ==
Five Montreal citizens founded the MOEB in 1992 inside of the former record factory in Saint Henri. Since 1996, the museum created yearly temporary exhibitions. In 2019 the museum added a permanent exhibition. Besides a large collection of locally produced shellac records, the museum held objects related to recording technology, broadcasting technology, different recording media and also objects related to the development of satellites. The objects dated from the pioneering time of the music industry until the time of digitization.

A weekly workshop for retired sound engineers, record collectors, historians, engineers, etc. took place since 2006, known as the Club des vieilles lampes.

The Musée des Ondes Emile Berliner permanent exposition displayed phonographs, gramophones, radios, and records from different eras which trace the history of sound recording and broadcasting, and temporary expositions which were presented annually. The museum's collection consisted of approximately 30 000 items. Since 2024, the museum held a collection of 24 early mechanical televisions. The museum archives feature business letters, historic advertisements, employment records, record catalogues, architectural plans etc. and are partially online accessible. The specialized in-house reference library has an online catalogue.

MOEB projects were financed by grants from the federal government, the city of Montreal and the province of Quebec.

As of 2019, 18% of operational costs were paid by the city of Montreal and the Sud-Ouest borough, the remaining 82% coming from the museum's self-generated revenue (visits, souvenir shop, donations).

== Exhibitions ==
- From the Gramophone to the Satellite (1996)
- Happy birthday Nipper… an Exhibition With a 100 Year Bite (2000)
- The Audio Chain (2002)
- 50 Years of Television in Montreal (2003)
- Marconi (2004)
- Montreal, the Cradle of the Recording Industry (2008)
- Goodbye Broadway, Hello Montréal (2010)
- Montreal Radio in Wartime (2015)
- Montreal in Space (2016)
- Design Montreal RCA (2017)
- 100 Years of Radio broadcasting in Montreal (2019)
- Herbert S. Berliner: Building the Canadian Recording Industry (2022)
- Radio at Home in Canada (2024), online, accessible through Digital Museum Canada
- Women in Montreal's Music Industry (2024)
- Montreal's Music Factory: 1001 rue Lenoir (2025)

== Publications ==
Early Radio Innovation in Canada, Canadian Marconi Company (1895-1938), by Denis Couillard. Bilingual, French and English, 2020, ISBN 978-1-7770988-0-3,
