= Saint-Henri, Montreal =

Saint-Henri
- Neighbourhood
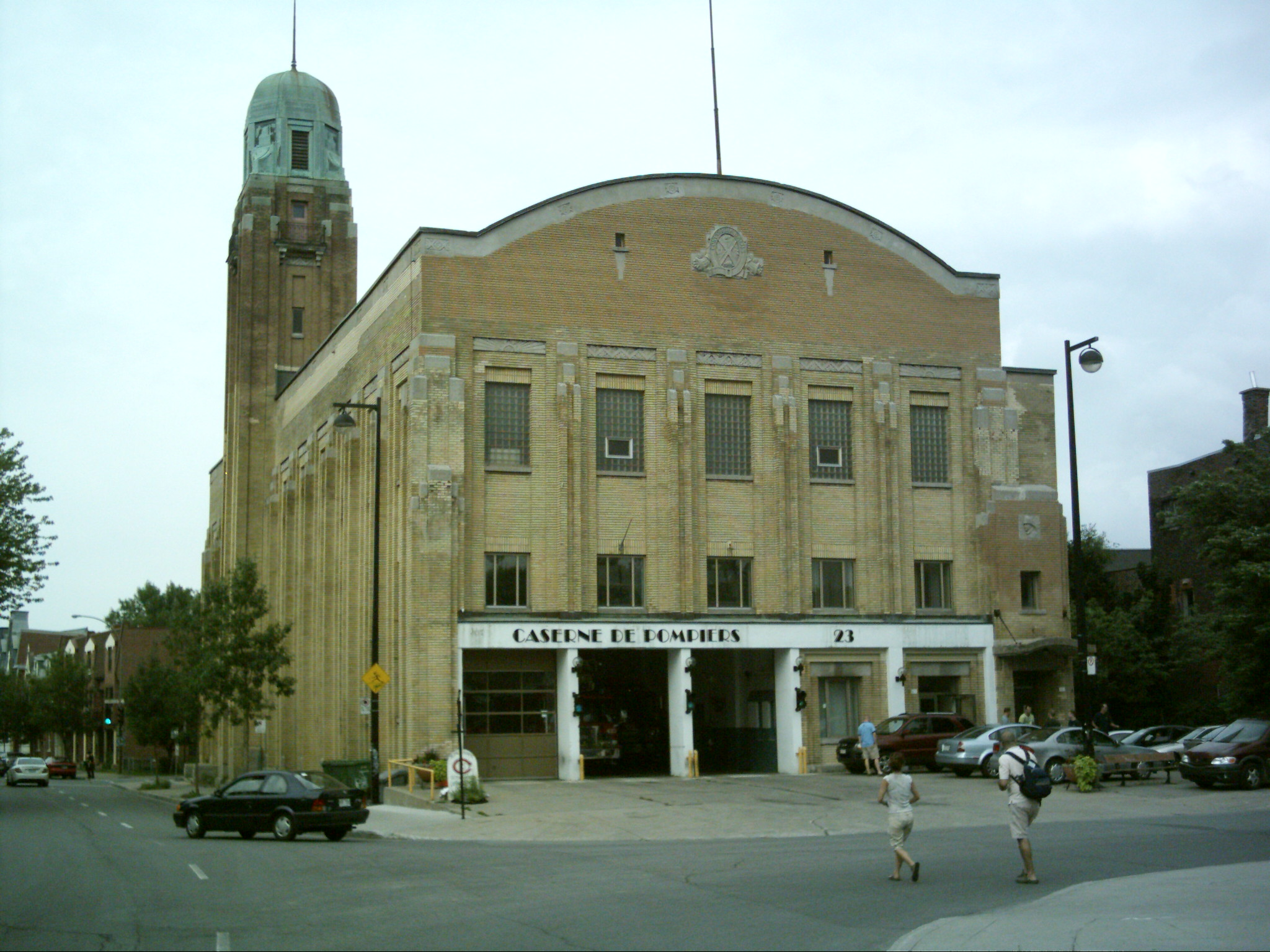
- Art deco 23 fire hall, Saint-Henri

- Location of Saint-Henri in Montreal
- Coordinates: 45.47716°N 73.58651°W
- Country: Canada
- Province: Quebec
- City: Montreal
- Borough: Le Sud-Ouest
- Established: 1685

Population (2011)
  - Total: 15,800
- Postal Code: H4C
- Area codes: 514, 438

Saint-Henri (French pronunciation: [sɛ̃ ɑ̃ʁi]) is a neighbourhood in southwestern Montreal, Quebec, Canada, in the borough of Le Sud-Ouest.

Saint-Henri is bounded to the east by Atwater Avenue, to the west by Autoroute 15, to the north by Autoroute Ville-Marie (Route 136), and to the south by the Lachine Canal.

== Description ==
Saint-Henri is well known as a historically French-Canadian working class neighbourhood, often contrasted with wealthy Westmount or NDG looking down over the Falaise Saint-Jacques. Since the beginning of the 2000s, Saint-Henri has been undergoing a process of gentrification, with new luxury condo developments, high-end restaurants, shops, cafés and bars.

The area—historically known as Les Tanneries because of the artisans' shops where leather tanning took place—was named for St. Henry via the Église Saint-Henri, which at one time formed Place Saint-Henri along with the community's fire and police station. The bustle of a nearby passenger rail station was immortalized in the song "Place St. Henri" (1964) by Oscar Peterson.

Saint-Henri is part of the municipal district of Saint-Henri–Petite-Bourgogne–Pointe-Saint-Charles. The borough hall for Le Sud-Ouest is located in a converted factory in Saint-Henri, bearing witness to the borough's industrial heritage.

Also located in the neighbourhood is Solin Hall, a student residence of McGill University. The former chocolate factory is home to nearly 300 students, and is the University's only off-campus residence.

The neighbourhood is served by two metro stations, Lionel-Groulx and Place-Saint-Henri.

== History ==
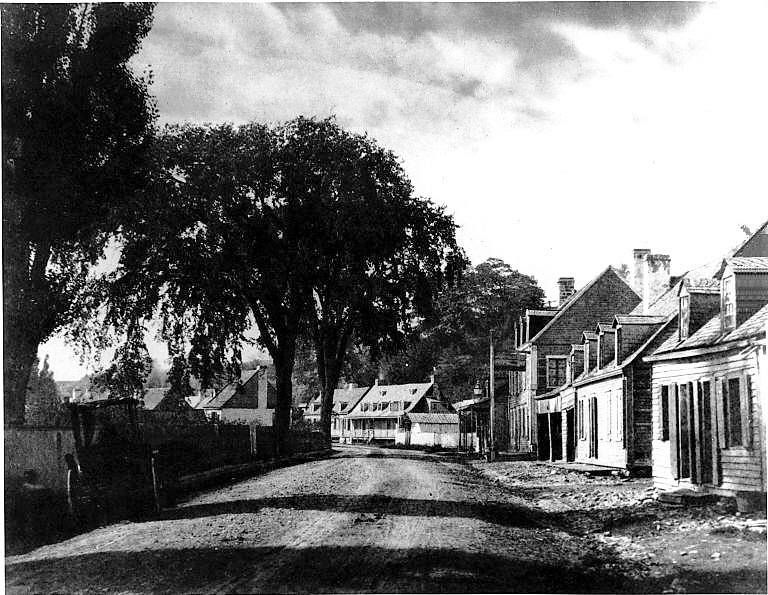
Saint-Henri's Les Tanneries, 1859.

Église Saint-Henri was so named to commemorate Fr. Henri-Auguste Roux (1798–1831), the superior of Saint-Sulpice Seminary. The municipality of Saint-Henri was formed in 1875, joining the village of Saint-Henri and the surrounding settlements of Turcot, Brodie, Saint-Agustin and Sainte-Marguerite into one administrative unit. The municipality was incorporated into the City of Montreal in 1905.

Well-known people from Saint-Henri include strongman Louis Cyr, who served as a police officer there; the Place des Hommes-Forts and the Parc Louis-Cyr are named for him. Celebrated jazz pianist Oscar Peterson grew up in Little Burgundy which is the neighbourhood adjacent to Saint-Henri. Stand-up comedian Yvon Deschamps has described the daily struggle of Saint-Henri's citizens with humorous melancholy.

Saint-Henri and Little Burgundy are divided by Atwater Avenue. Historically, Little Burgundy was occupied primarily by African-Canadians who worked on the railroads while Saint-Henri was occupied predominantly by French-Canadian blue-collar workers, but nonetheless boasted African-Canadian shops, a gentleman's club (The European) and Montreal's first black congregation, Union United. Today both neighbourhoods have a population of varied ethnicity and social class, especially in the recent housing developments that have sprouted along the Lachine Canal. A great number of teenagers from neighbouring districts attend Polyvalente Saint-Henri and James Lyng High School (English Montreal School Board).

St-Henri housed the Victor Talking Machine Company's first factory space located in Canada where they produced flat discs, gramophones, radios, and military equipment for the Second World War. Though the space has changed much over the years and the building is no longer in use as a factory of RCA Victor, there is a museum located in the old RCA building called le Musée des Ondes Emile Berliner. The museum covers the life of Emile Berliner, inventor of the gramophone, as well as details the history of his inventions, as well as his company even after his family was no longer affiliated with it. The museum is a technology museum and explores the nature and science behind sound waves.

Many of the district's notable Art deco buildings, including Atwater Market and the historic No. 23 fire hall, were designed by Ludger Lemieux.

== Places of Note ==
Église Saint-Zotique is a Catholic Church located on Notre-Dame Street West. The parish dates to 1909 but the construction of the church occurred from 1926 to 1927.

Atwater Market is a market hall open since 1933. The market was built in the Art Deco style.

== Parks ==
Saint-Henri has several notable parks.

- Parc des Corroyeurs
- Parc Émile-Berliner
- Parc Gadbois
- Parc des Hommes-Fort
- Parc Jacques-Viger
- Parc Lac-à-la-Loutre
- Parc Louis-Cyr
- Parc Saint-Henri
- Square Sainte-Élisabeth
- Square Sir-George-Étienne-Cartier

== Depictions in literature and film ==
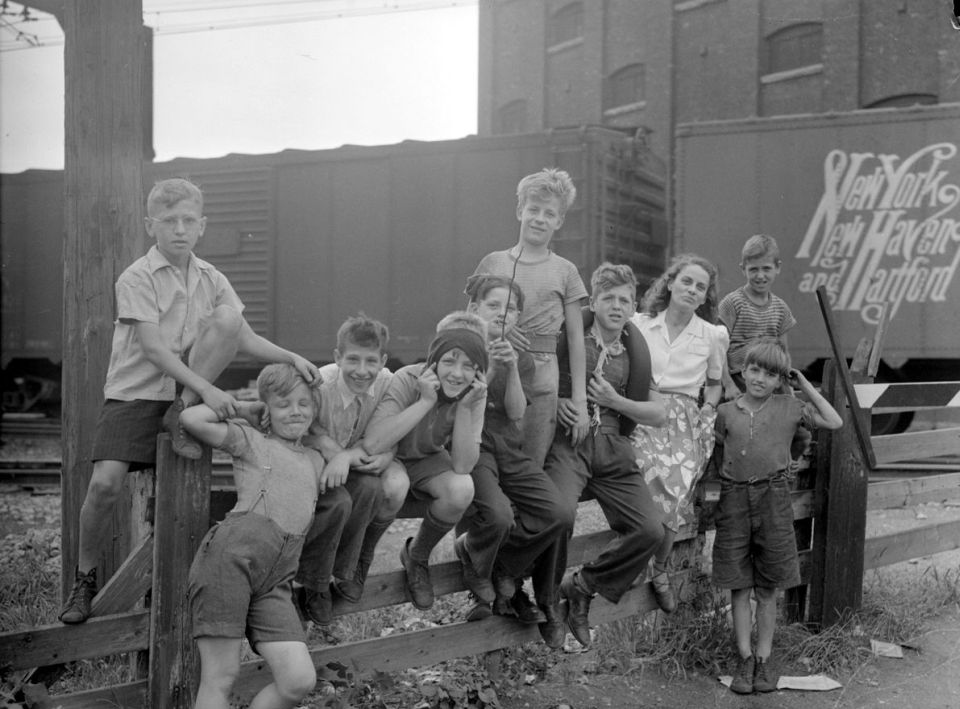
Gabrielle Roy in 1945 with boys from Saint-Henri, the working-class neighbourhood of Montreal where The Tin Flute takes place.

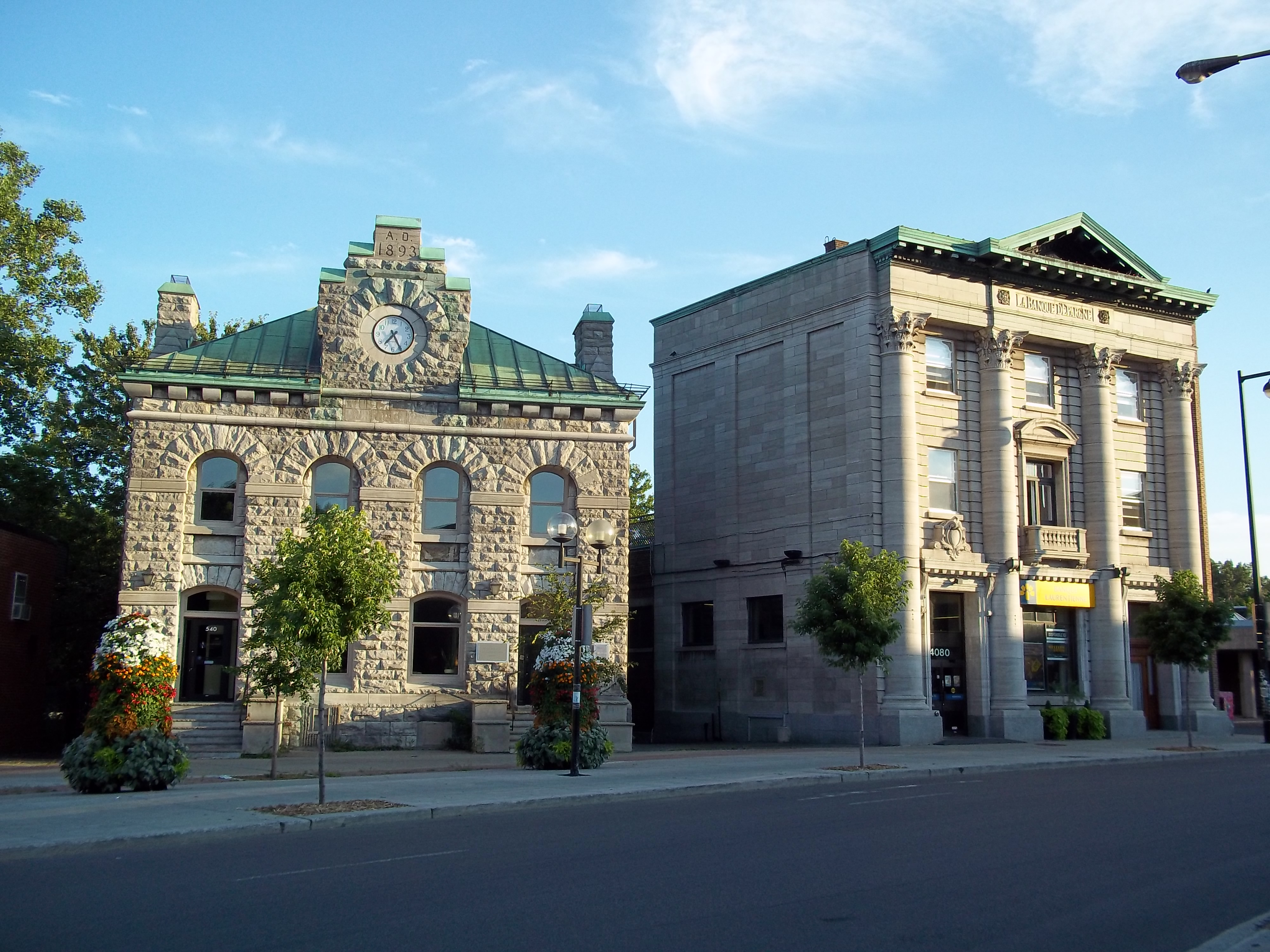
Place Saint-Henri

The district's working-class character was most memorably recorded by Gabrielle Roy in her novel The Tin Flute (Bonheur d'occasion).

Saint-Henri has been the subject of two National Film Board of Canada (NFB) documentaries, each capturing one day in the life of the district. In 1962 Hubert Aquin directed À St-Henri le cinq septembre (September Five at Saint-Henri). In 2010, director Shannon Walsh and producer Sarah Spring oversaw a crew of sixteen videographers as they followed area residents during one summer's day to make À St-Henri le 26 août, an NFB/Parabola Films co-production inspired by Aquin's cinéma-vérité classic.

== Notable people from Saint-Henri ==
- Oscar Peterson - Canadian jazz pianist
- Pat Burns - former police officer, NHL head coach and TV hockey broadcaster
- Yvon Deschamps - author, actor, comedian and producer
- Louis Cyr - strongman who served as a police officer in Saint-Henri, commemorated with a park, a square, and a statue

== See also ==
- List of former cities in Quebec
- Little Burgundy
- Pointe-Saint-Charles
- Saint-Henri Church

== Gallery ==
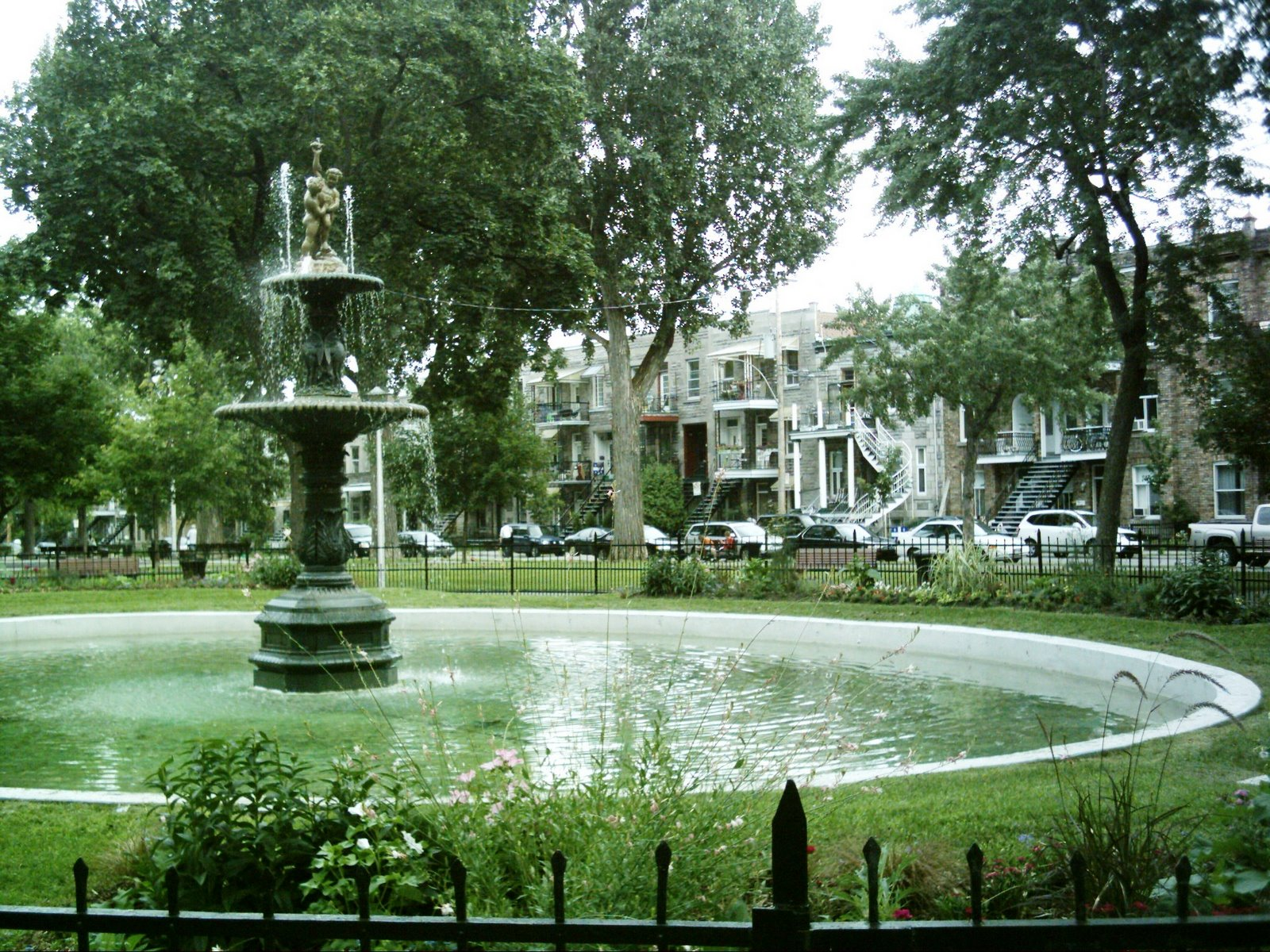
Sir George-Étienne Cartier Square

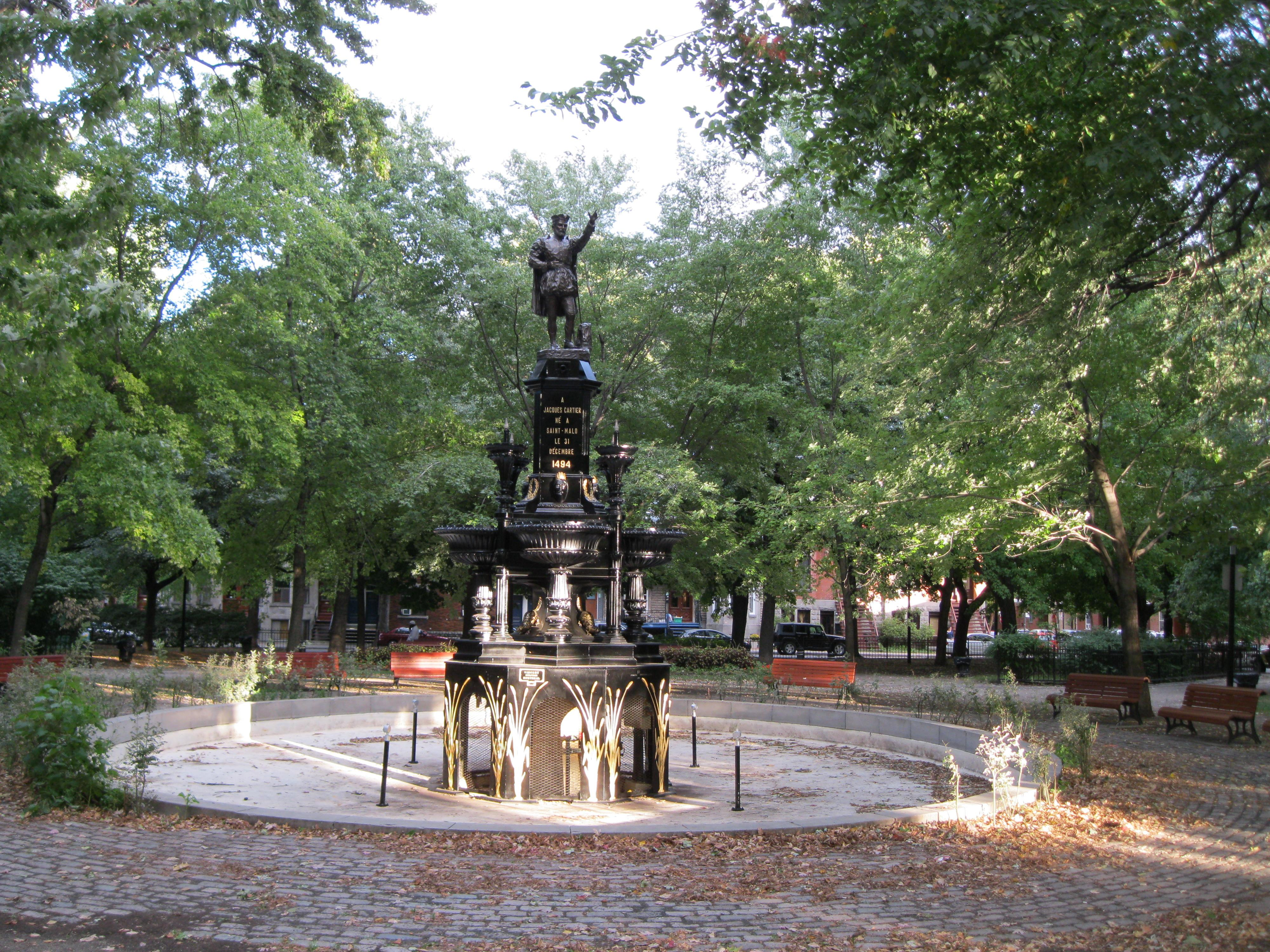
Saint Henri Square

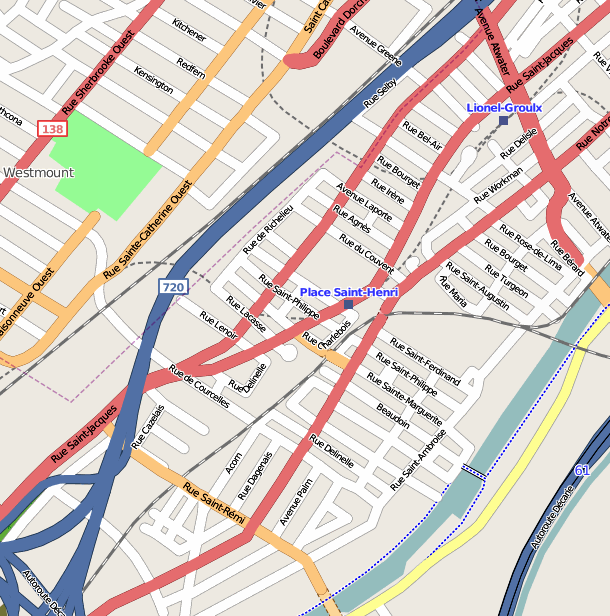
Saint-Henri Map

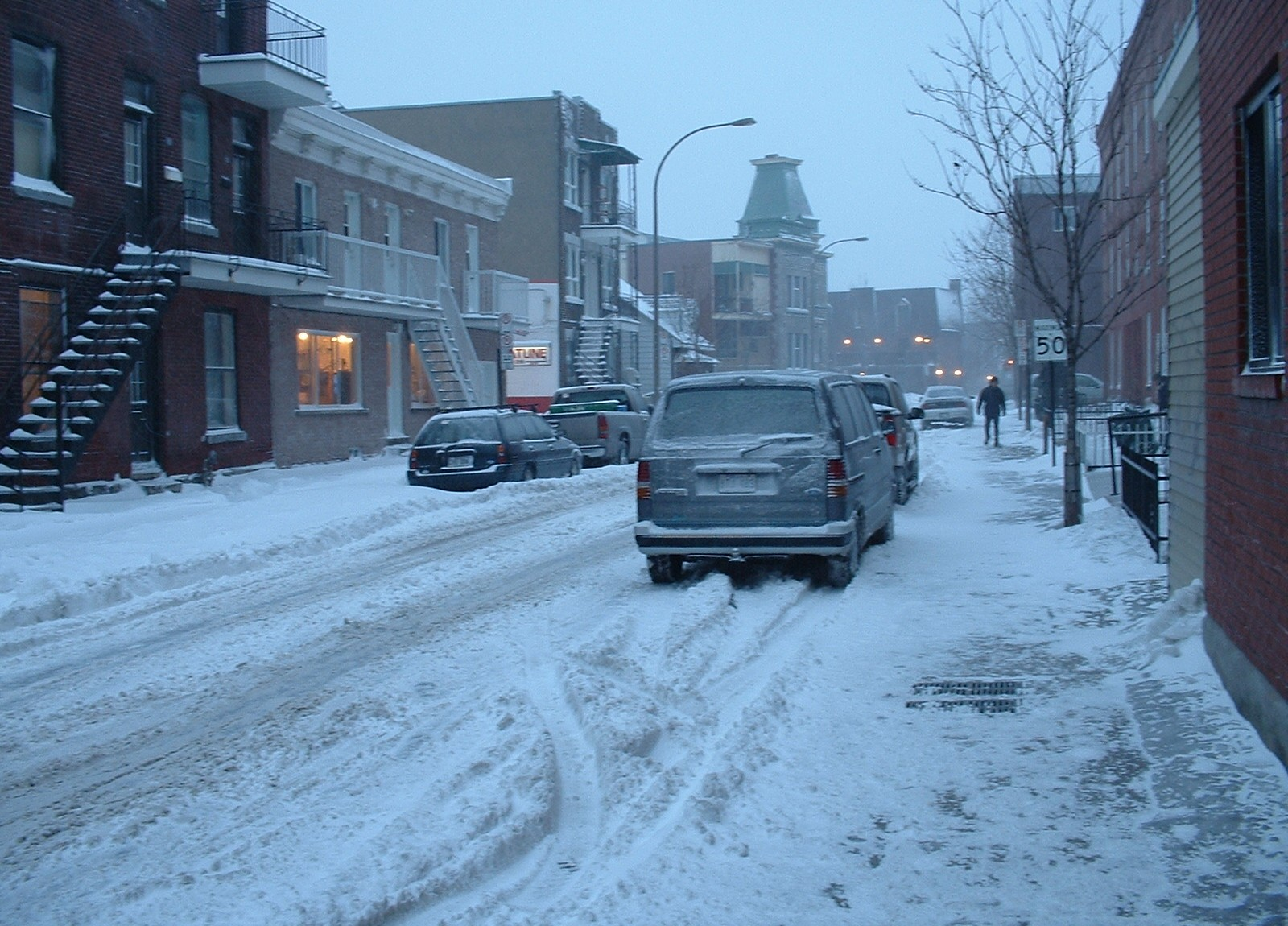
Saint-Henri in February

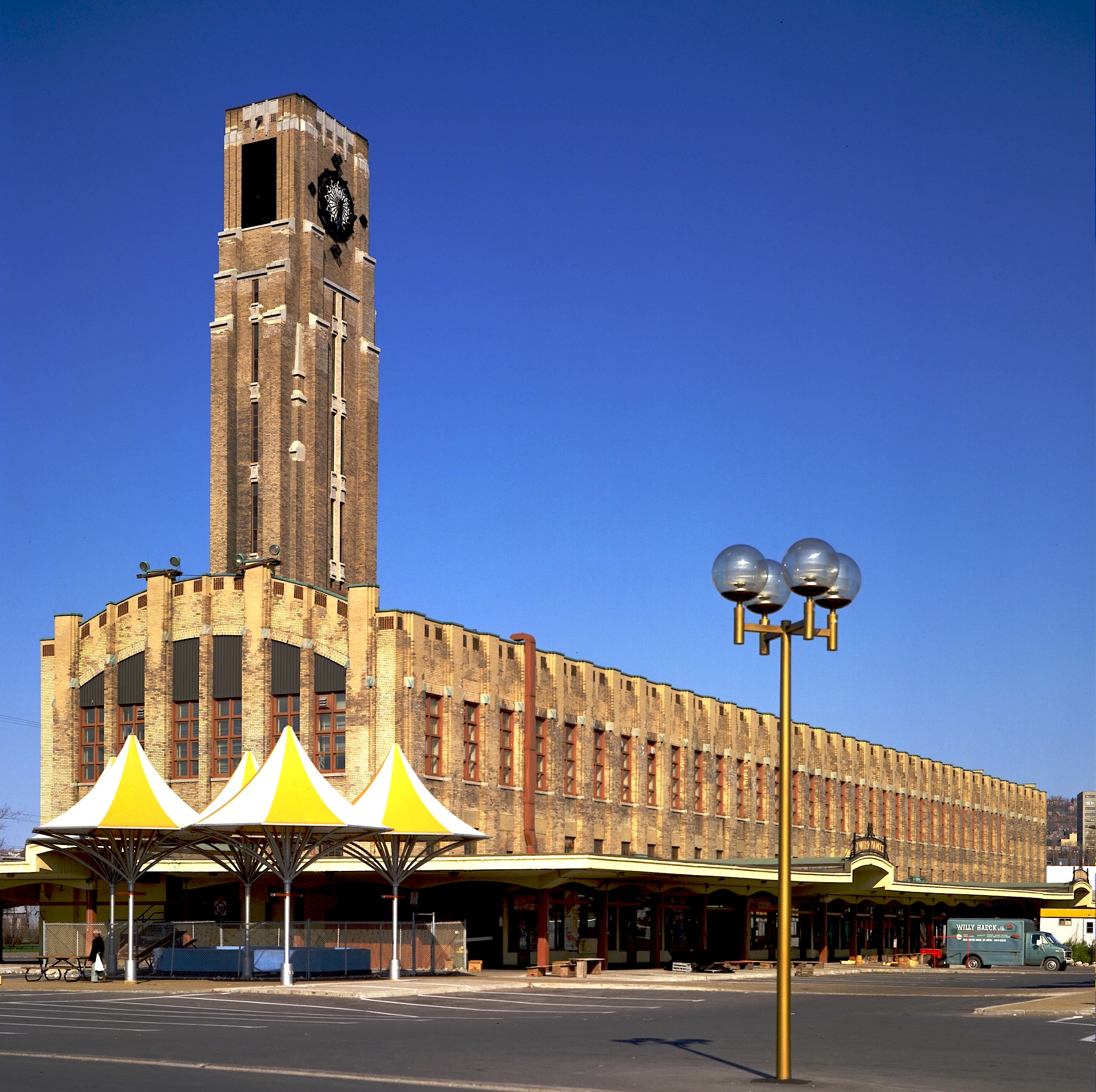
Atwater Market
