= Sir George-Étienne Cartier Square =

Square in Montreal, Canada

- French: square Sir George-Étienne-Cartier
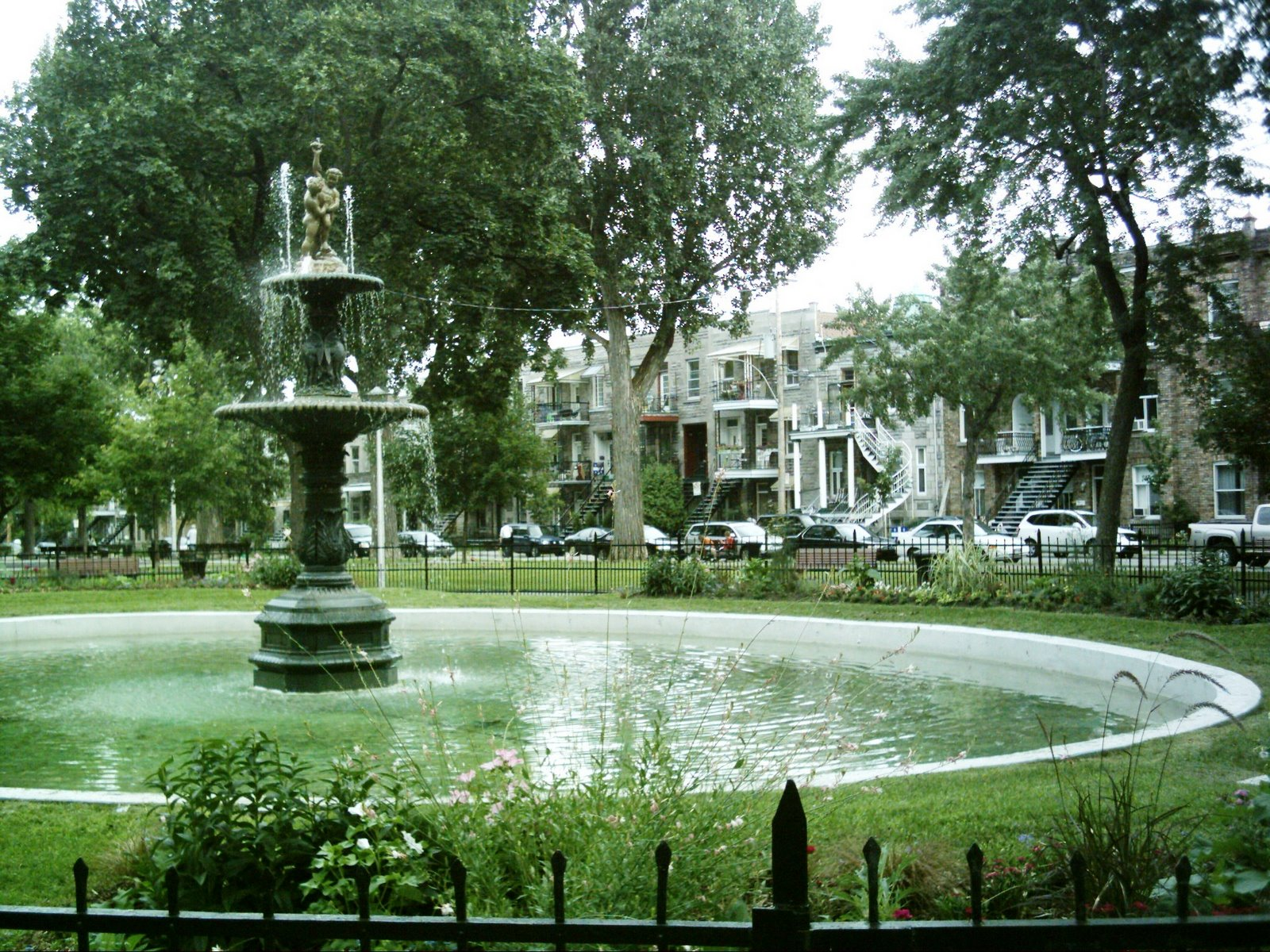
- The fountain at Sir George-Étienne Cartier Square

- Location within Montreal
- Type: Park
- Location: Saint-Henri, Montreal, Quebec, Canada
- Coordinates: 45°28′25″N 73°35′11″W
- Created: 1912
- Operator: City of Montreal

Sir George-Étienne Cartier Square (officially in French: square Sir-George-Étienne-Cartier) is a town square and park in Montreal, Quebec, Canada. It is located in the Saint-Henri neighbourhood of the Southwest borough.

It is a small rectangular square with a fountain in the middle, woods in the northern part and a pool in the southern part. It is surrounded by rowhouses.

Named after politician George-Étienne Cartier, it was built in 1912 on the site of an old west-end slaughterhouse. When Saint-Henri was annexed by the city of Montreal in 1905, the construction of this square had been an election promise made by Hormidas Laporte, the Mayor of Montreal at the time. According to the regulations adopted during its development, the houses around the square were to be built with stone façades and decorative brick.

Restored in 2003, the fountain that occupies the centre of the square was installed for the opening of the square in 1912. The different components of the fountain were ordered by catalogue from J. L. Mott Iron Works foundry of New York City. The fountain was shut down for repairs in the summer of 2022, with no projected re-opening date.

== Sports facilities ==
=== Pool ===
In the summer of 2020, a renovated outdoor pool opened. It is free to the public, and features non-gendered changing facilities, a dedicated children's pool, and is accessible to wheelchair users. The wall of the pool facing the Lachine Canal features artwork by Isabelle Duguay commemorating Liam Aglat-Clayman, a 9-year-old who died after being hit by a car on the corner of Square Sir George-Étienne Cartier street and Saint-Ambroise in 2020.

=== Tennis courts ===
Just south of the pool, there are two outdoor tennis courts.
