= Hommage à Marguerite Bourgeoys =

1988 sculpture and memorial by Jules Lasalle

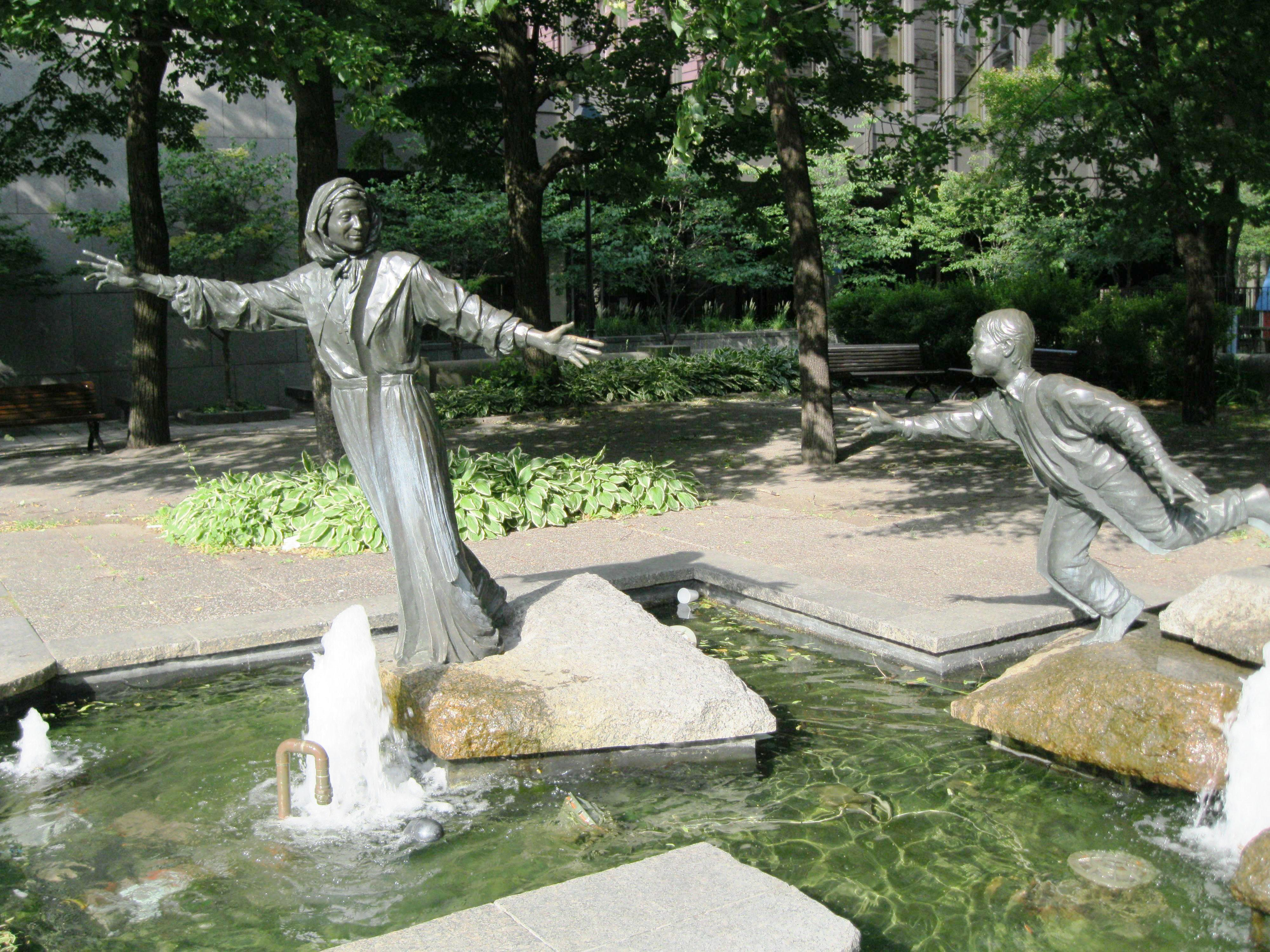
- The memorial in 2012
- Artist: Jules Lasalle
- Year: 1988
- Medium: Sculpture
- Subject: Marguerite Bourgeoys
- Location: Montreal, Quebec, Canada; 45.50729°N 73.55525°W

Hommage à Marguerite Bourgeoys is an outdoor 1988 sculpture and memorial depicting the founder of the Congregation of Notre Dame of Montreal of the same name by Jules Lasalle, installed in Place Marguerite-Bourgeoys, at 85 Notre-Dame Street East, in Montreal.

== See also ==
- 1988 in art
