= Saint Henri Square =

Town square in Montreal, Canada

- Square Saint-Henri
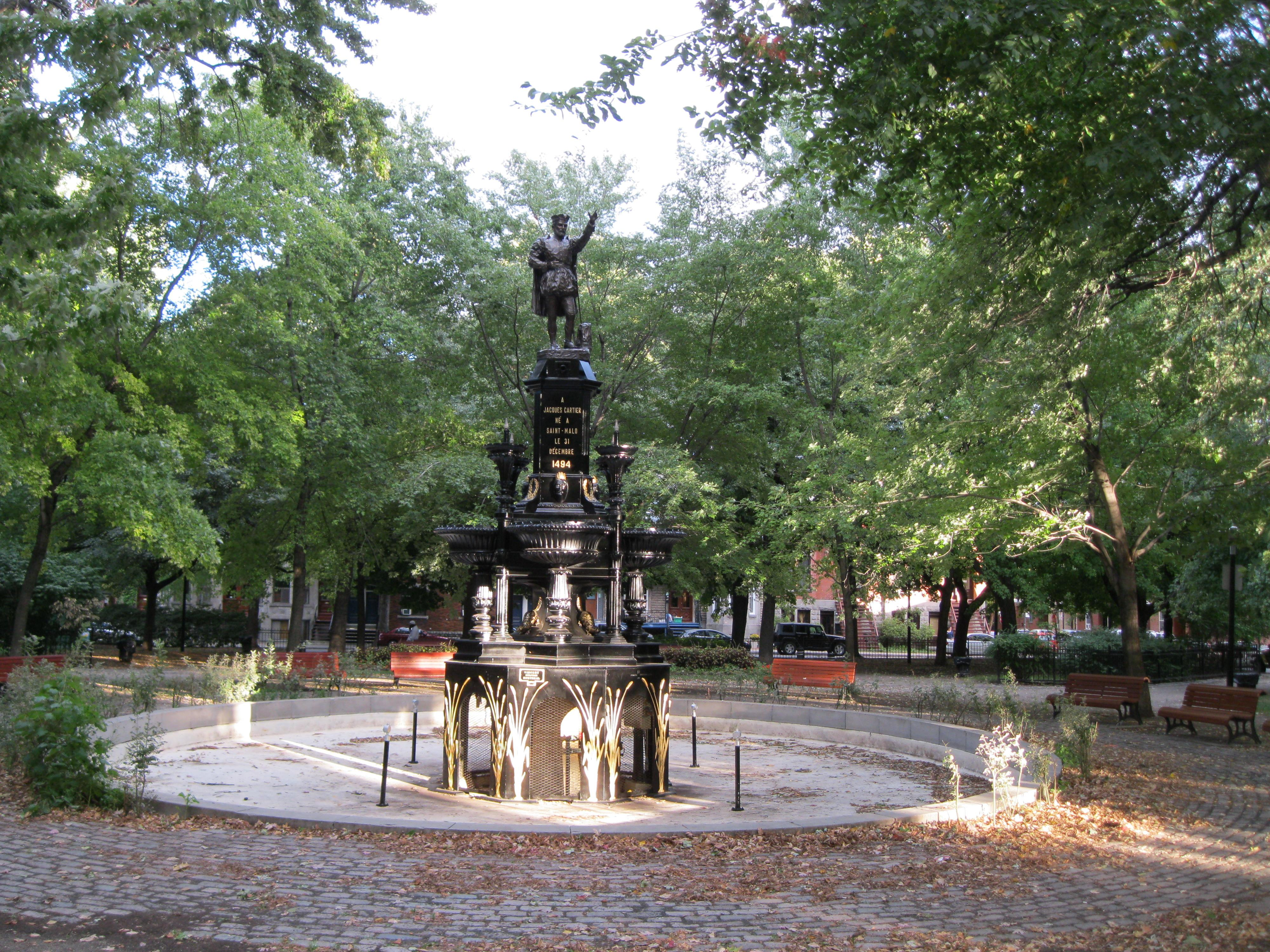
- The Jacques Cartier Monument in Saint Henri Square

- Location within Montreal
- Type: Town square
- Location: Saint-Henri, Montreal, Quebec, Canada
- Coordinates: 45°28′48″N 73°35′11″W
- Created: 1893
- Operator: City of Montreal
- Open: 6:00 a.m. to 11:00 p.m.
- Public transit: at Place-Saint-Henri station STM Buses: 77, 78, 191, 371

Saint Henri Square (French: Square Saint-Henri), known officially as Saint Henri Park (French: Parc Saint-Henri)) is a town square in Montreal, Quebec, Canada. It is centrally located in the Saint Henri neighbourhood of the Le Sud-Ouest borough. The square is bordered by Saint Antoine Street West to the north, Agnes Street to the west, Place Guay to the south and Laporte Avenue to the east.

In 1890, the former city of Saint Henri acquired some land adjacent to Saint Antoine Street to create a small public park. It would become the first public park in Saint Henri.

The square is surrounded by Victorian row houses and triplexes which were built for members of the local elite.

== Jacques Cartier Monument ==
Jacques Cartier Monument
- Monument à Jacques Cartier
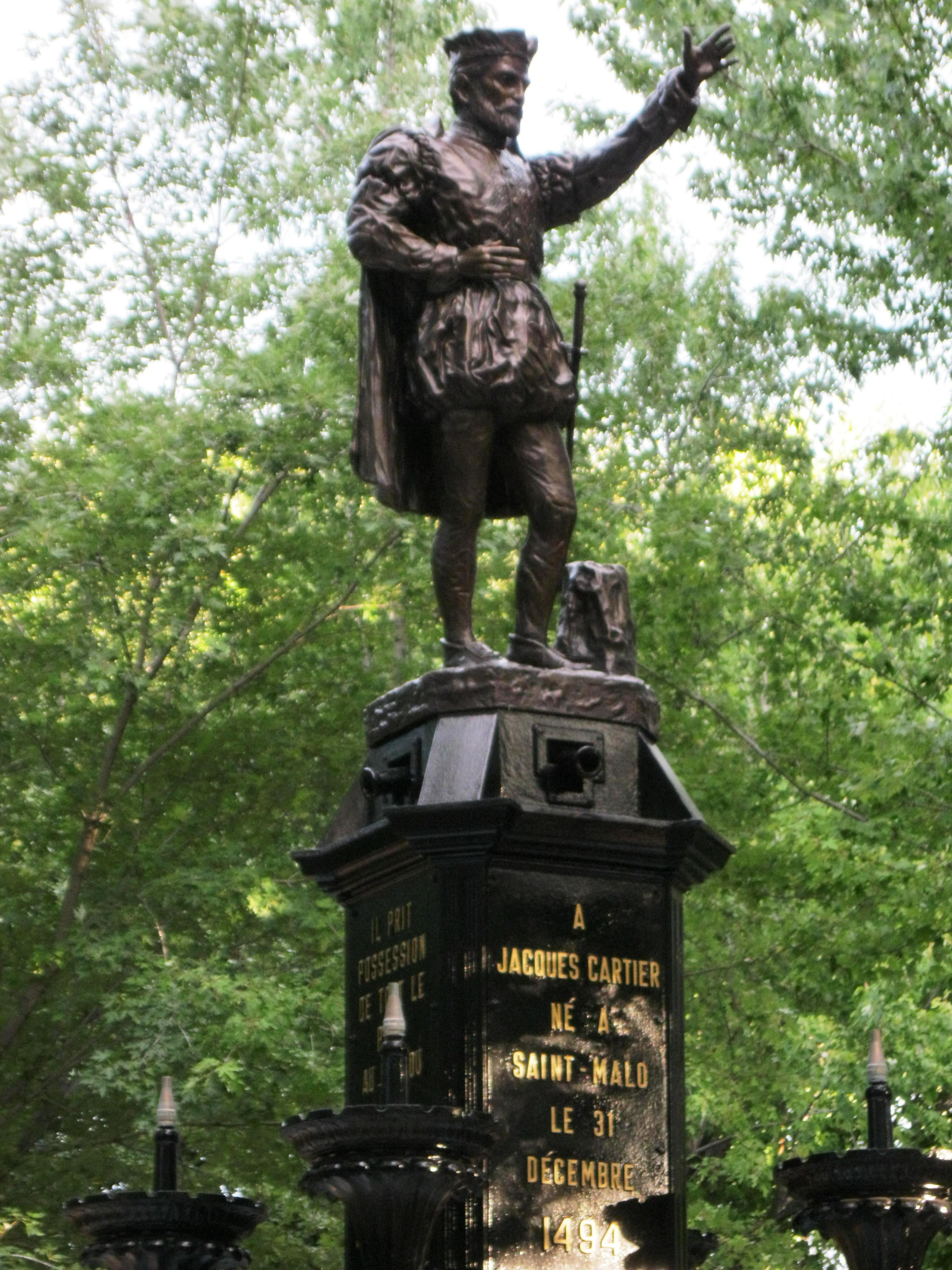
- Replica monument in 2012
- Interactive map of Jacques Cartier Monument
- Location: Saint Henri Square
- Coordinates: 45.48008°N 73.58629°W
- Designer: Joseph-Arthur Vincent
- Type: Monument
- Material: Cast iron
- Height: 9 metres (30 ft)
- Opening date: 1893
- Dedicated to: Jacques Cartier

A commission for a monument to the French explorer Jacques Cartier was made shortly thereafter to Quebec sculptor Joseph-Arthur Vincent. In 1893, this statue was installed and unveiled in the centre of the square. It stands 9 metres (30 ft) tall and was made of cast iron.

In the 1990s, the Cartier statue was replaced with a replica because the original had deteriorated due to exposure. In 1992, working from both original and archival photographs, sculptor Jules Lasalle produced a faithful copy. The original statue was then relocated to the Place Saint Henri metro station.

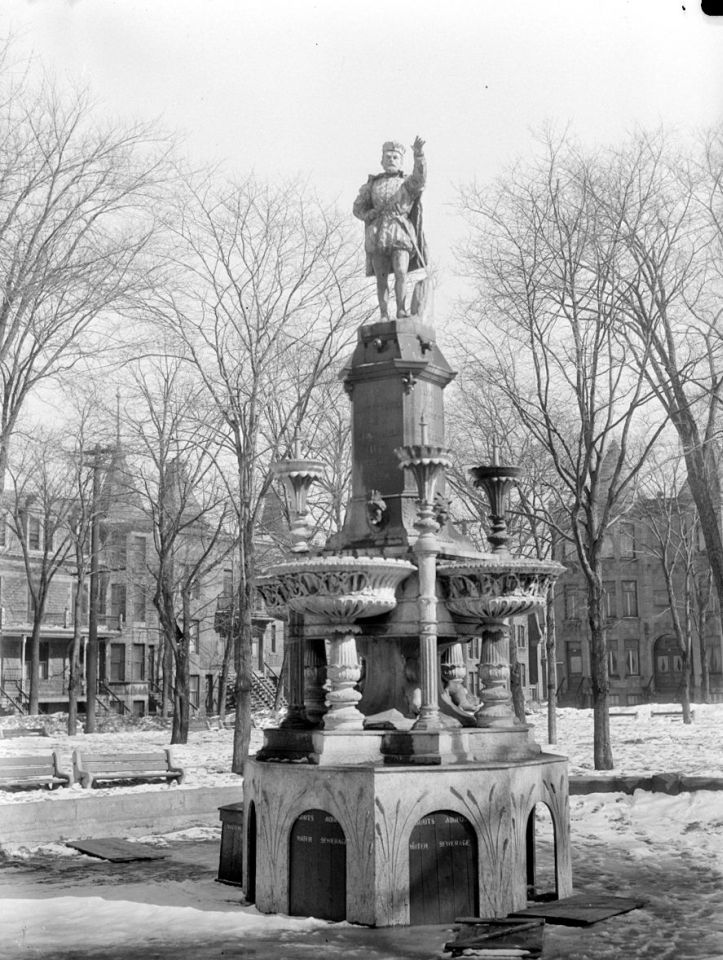
Original monument in 1945
