= September Five at Saint-Henri =

September Five at Saint-Henri (French: À St-Henri le cinq septembre) is a 1962 National Film Board of Canada (NFB) documentary film directed by Hubert Aquin about the first day of school for children and their families in the working class Montreal district of Saint-Henri. As Aquin was primarily a writer, he worked with a variety of cameramen. The NFB credits 11 on the film—Guy Borremans, Michel Brault, Georges Dufaux, Claude Fournier, Bernard Gosselin, Jean Roy, Claude Jutra, Bernard Devlin, Arthur Lipsett, Don Owen and Daniel Fournier. Caroline Zéau in her book L'Office national du film et le cinéma canadien (1939-2003): éloge de la frugalité states that as many as 28 filmmakers worked on the project, including the entire French production team, with Jacques Godbout reading narration.

The film was originally released in French as a 42-minute film. The English-language version is shorter, with a 27-minute running time.

== Reaction ==
While the filmmakers sought to make a socially activist film by portraying conditions in the poor neighbourhood, some residents were so dismayed by their depiction in the film that they withdrew their children from school and moved out of the area. In subsequent NFB films such as Fernand Dansereau's Saint-Jérôme, filmmakers sought to involve residents in a participatory filmmaking process, so as to avoid such a negative reaction.

== Sequel ==
In 2011, director Shannon Walsh assembled 16 filmmakers to once again record the first day of school for children in Saint-Henri, in the NFB/Parabola Films documentary À St-Henri, le 26 août.

== See also ==
- Challenge for Change, a subsequent NFB participatory film project
