= Jules Lasalle =

- Born: April 1, 1957 (age 68); Saint-Michel-des-Saints, Quebec, Canada
- Notable work: commemorative monuments

Jules Lasalle (born April 1, 1957) is a Canadian sculptor living and working in Montreal. He has made many commemorative monuments that can be seen in Montreal, Longueuil, Quebec City, and other places.

== Works ==
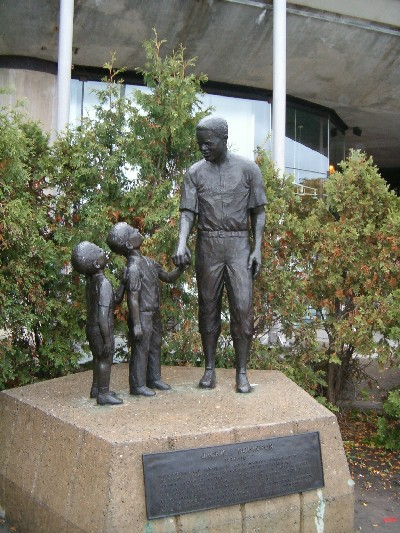
Jackie Robinson behind Montreal's Olympic Stadium

In 2012, the Canadian Pauline Marois unveiled a statue by Lasalle of Idola Saint-Jean, Thérèse Casgrain and Marie-Claire Kirkland. The statue was to celebrate the 50th anniversary of Kirkland being made the first Canadian female minister.

- Monica, erected in 1985 on Promenade du Père-Marquette, in Lachine borough, Montreal.
- Natasha, monumental sculpture in 3 fragments, imitating Easter Island's statues, erected in Lachine in 1986.
- Jackie Robinson, erected in 1987 behind Montreal's Olympic Stadium.
- Joseph-Xavier Perreault's bust, erected in 1987 behind Place du Commerce, Montreal.
- Hommage à Marguerite Bourgeoys, erected in 1988 in Old Montreal, behind the 85, Notre-Dame street.
- Hommage aux femmes qui consacrèrent leur vie à l'instruction et à l'éducation: Marie de l'Incarnation, Quebec city, 1997
- Monument aux Frères éducateurs: Marcellin Champagnat et Jean-Baptiste de la Salle: L'envol, Quebec city, 2000
- Maurice Richard's monument, Montreal, 2001
- Statues pour la Chapelle Notre-Dame du Sacré-Cœur, Montreal, 2002
- Monument du Chevalier de Lorimier, Montreal.
- Pierres tombales (with Annick Bourgeau) for a campaign on AIDS, Agence Marketel), 2003
- Deportation, i.e. Great Upheaval (with André Fournelle), Acadia, Grand-Pré National Historic Site of Canada, 2006
- Robert Bourassa's monument, behind the Parliament of Quebec, 2006.
- Jean Béliveau's statue (with Annick Bourgeau), Colisée Jean-Béliveau, Longueuil, 2007

== See also ==
- Jacques Cartier Monument (Montreal)

== Gallery ==
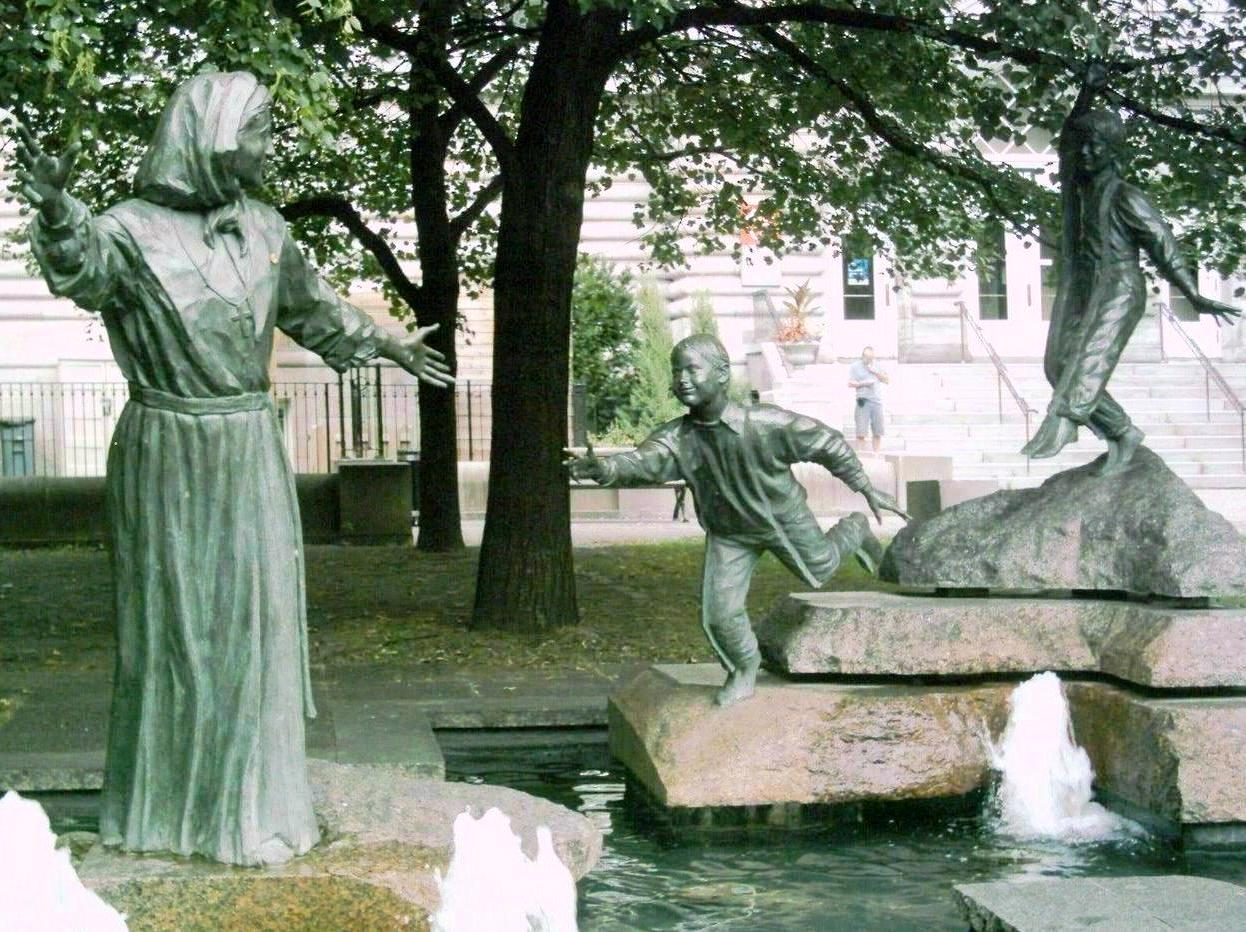
Marguerite Bourgeoys

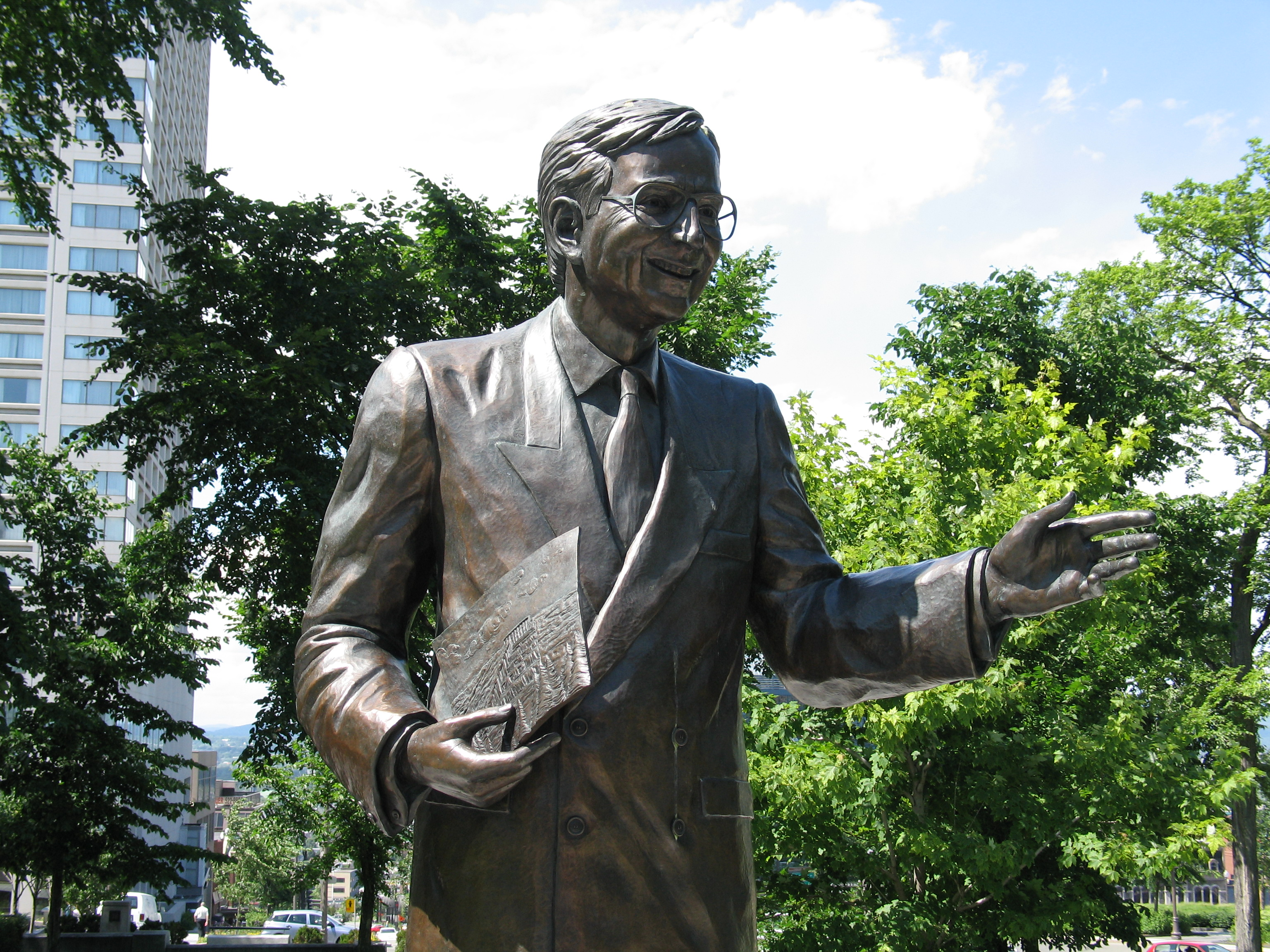
Robert Bourassa
