= Parabola Films =

Canadian cinema production company

Parabola Films is a Montreal-based Canadian cinema production company founded by Sarah Spring and Selin Murat, a documentary filmmaker. Parabola Films focuses on the production of videos which demonstrate the role of cinema in social change. The company collaborates with other film-making organizations who emphasize storytelling.

== History ==
Parabola Films' offering "Ariel" was shown at the International Documentary Film Festival Amsterdam, and at the Rencontres Internationales du Documentaire de Montréal 2013. It was funded by a grant from the Rogers Documentary and Cable Network Fund. It also aired on the CBC Television network.

Jeppe on a Friday was funded through IndieGoGO, filmed in Johannesburg with the collaboration of eight small local filmmakers, and shown at theBeijing International Film Festival.

To film A St-Henri le 26 Aout in just one day, sixteen filmmakers worked together, under the direction of Shannon Walsh of Parabola Films. The film was screened at the Durban International Film Festival.

When the Trumpet Sounds was funded by grants from the Canadian Media Fund.

In 2015, Parabola Films co-produced, along with Galaxia 311, Simon Hernandez’sfilm Pinilla, which is combines fictional and documentary aspects. Parabola also produced, in collaboration with Radio Canada, the film Nuestro Monte Luna, which screened at the Hot Docs film festival in Toronto.

In 2017, Parabola Films secured funding from the Theatrical Documentary Program, sponsored by Telefilm Canada and Rogers Group, for its upcoming film Billy. Also that year, Parabola filmmaker Sarah Chadwick created a documentary 1999, about suicides at a high school. It was filmed in Moncton, New Brunswick, and was funded by Eurimages.

In 2018, Parabola Films completed another documentary, Sweet Dreams for Chiyo, about a young girl living with diabetes.

== Collaborators ==
Founders

- Sarah Spring - producer
- Selin Murat - producer

Directors

- Shannon Walsh - director
- Laura Bari - director
- Pablo Alvarez-Mesa - director

== Films ==
Date	Film	Director	Notes
2011	A St-Henri le 26 Aout	Shannon Walsh	
2012	Jeppe on a Friday	Shannon Walsh and Arya Lalloo	
2013	Ariel	Laura Bari	
	When the Trumpet Sounds		
2011	Little Scream:The Lamb	Shannon Walsh	
