= Le Sud-Ouest =

Coordinates: 45°27′21″N 73°35′33″W

- Borough of Montreal
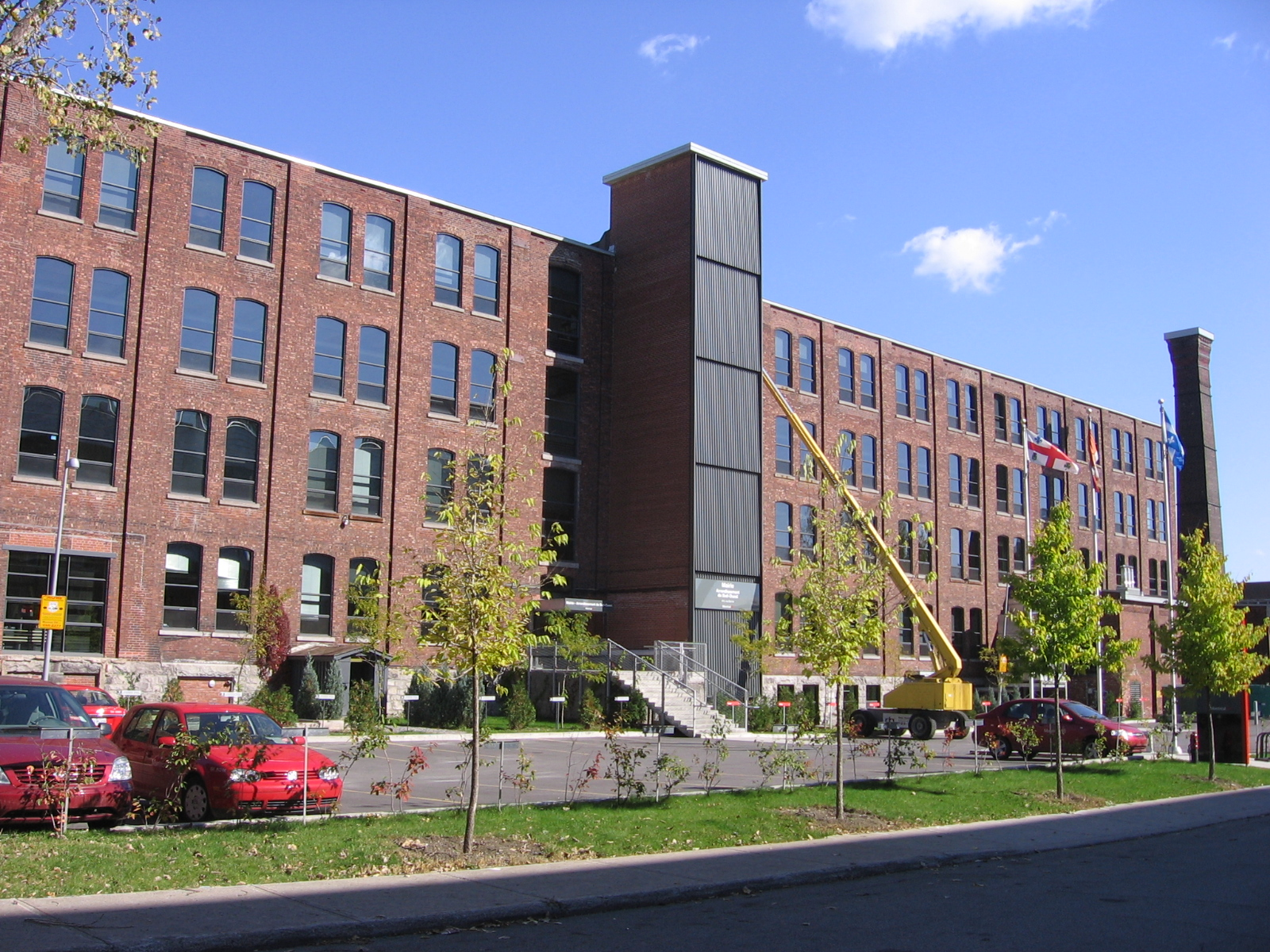
- The borough hall of Le Sud-Ouest in Saint-Henri. In line with the area's industrial heritage, the building is a converted factory.

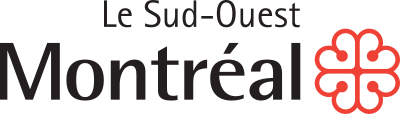

- Location on the Island of Montreal. (Dark grey areas indicate demerged municipalities).
- Country: Canada
- Province: Quebec
- Region: Montreal (06)
- Created: January 1, 2002
- Electoral Districts Federal: LaSalle—Émard—Verdun; Ville-Marie—Le Sud-Ouest—Île-des-Sœurs
- Provincial: Saint-Henri–Sainte-Anne

Government
  - Type: Borough
  - Mayor: Véronique Fournier (PM)
  - Federal MP(s): Claude Guay (LPC); Marc Miller (LPC)
  - Quebec MNA(s): Guillaume Cliche-Rivard (QS)

Area
  - Total: 15.7 km^{2} (6.1 sq mi)

Population (2021)
  - Total: 84,553
  - Density: 4,984.1/km^{2} (12,909/sq mi)
  - Dwellings: 40,900
- Time zone: UTC-5 (EST)
  - Summer (DST): UTC-4 (EDT)
- Postal code(s): H3C, H4C, H4E, H3J, H3K
- Area codes: (514) and (438)
- Access Routes A-10 A-15: A-20
- Website: https://montreal.ca/le-sud-ouest

Le Sud-Ouest (French pronunciation: [lə syd wɛst], lit. 'The Southwest') is a borough (arrondissement) of the city of Montreal, Quebec, Canada.

== Geography ==
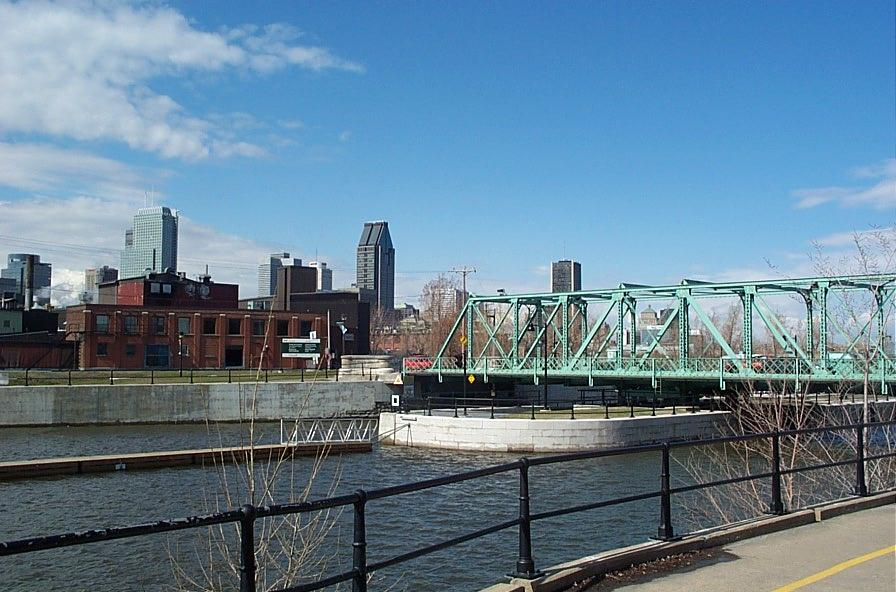
A lock on the Lachine Canal between Petite-Bourgogne and Pointe-Saint-Charles.

Le Sud-Ouest is an amalgam of several neighbourhoods with highly distinct histories and identities, mainly with working-class and industrial origins, grouped around the Lachine Canal. These include Saint-Henri, Little Burgundy, and Griffintown to the north of the canal, and Ville-Émard, Côte-Saint-Paul, and Pointe-Saint-Charles to the south.

Located southwest of downtown Montreal (hence the name), the borough is bordered to the northwest by Côte-des-Neiges—Notre-Dame-de-Grâce, to the northeast by the Ville-Marie borough, to the south by the borough of Verdun, to the west by the borough of LaSalle and the town of Montreal West, and to the north by the city of Westmount. The Saint Lawrence River is located upon part of its eastern edge.

== History ==
See History of Saint-Henri, History of Little Burgundy, History of Ville-Émard, History of Côte-Saint-Paul, and History of Pointe-Saint-Charles.

Originally devoted to agriculture, the various municipalities and districts of the Sud-Ouest underwent rapid industrialization following the opening of the Lachine Canal in 1825, becoming the cradle of Canadian industry thanks to both the transportation and the water power offered by the canal. The Canadian National Railway and Grand Trunk Railway also came through Saint-Henri and Pointe-Saint-Charles. The area became a stronghold of the working class, often in difficult conditions such as those described in Gabrielle Roy's The Tin Flute, set in Saint-Henri.

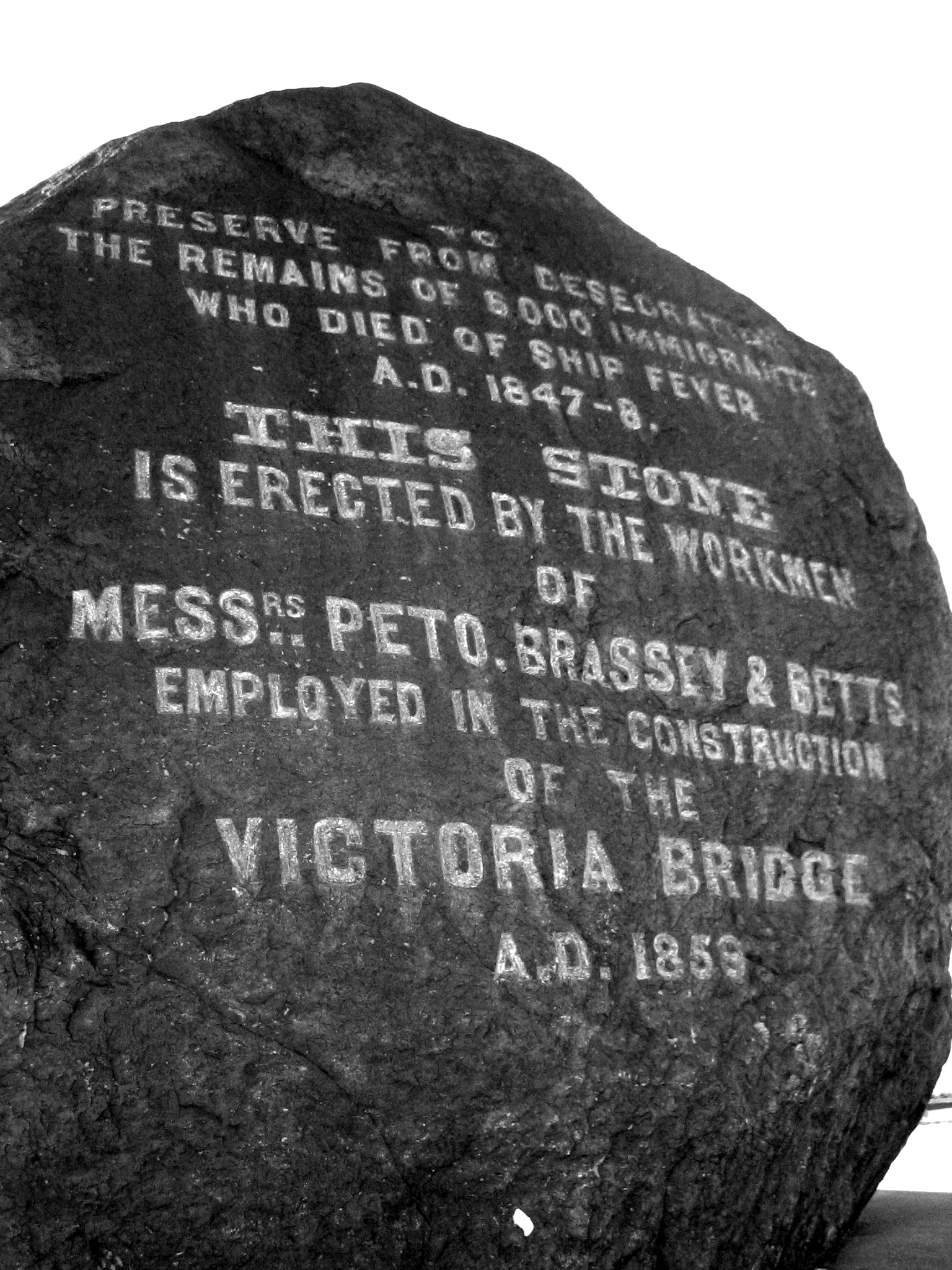
Monument to Irish immigrants in Pointe-Saint-Charles.

The areas of the borough had highly specific identities. The neighbourhoods in the western part of the borough——Saint-Henri, Ville-Émard, and Côte-Saint-Paul——were chiefly French Canadian, while Pointe-Saint-Charles and Griffintown were considered the seat of Irish culture in Montreal, with street names such as Hibernia and St. Patrick testifying to it. Starting in 1887, a large English-speaking Black community arose in Little Burgundy, attracted from the United States, other parts of Canada, and the Caribbean by jobs in the railways whose stations lay nearby; the area became famed for musical figures such as Oscar Peterson.

The city of Montreal annexed the town of Saint-Henri in 1905, Sainte-Cunégonde (Little Burgundy) in 1906, and Côte-Saint-Paul and Ville-Émard in 1910.

However, with vessels constantly growing and finally exceeding the capacity of the canal, the coming of the St. Lawrence Seaway in 1956 and the closure of the Lachine Canal in 1970 put an end to the area's industrial prosperity. Population fell sharply and conditions became still more difficult. Projects such as the Décarie Expressway, Turcot Interchange, Bonaventure Expressway, and Expo '67 destroyed entire neighbourhoods, such as Goose Village and part of Côte-Saint-Paul. However, community mobilization preserved the area's social fabric; in particular, the Pointe-Saint-Charles Community Clinic became the model for the CLSC system now used throughout the province.

The reorganization of Montreal in 2002 following the municipal mergers saw the creation of the borough council system, and accordingly, the creation of the borough of Le Sud-Ouest. The borough council met in several temporary locations, including the Marie Uguay cultural centre in Ville-Émard, before the inauguration of the current borough hall in a repurposed factory in Saint-Henri.

Today, Le Sud-Ouest is undergoing an economic and social renaissance, stimulated by the reclamation of the canal for recreation in 2002; businesses opened up and numerous factories were converted into lofts and condominiums. This revival is bringing its own pressures, however, as gentrification increases property taxes and costs of living on the many low-income residents and puts pressure on the availability of low-income housing. The pending reconstruction of the Turcot Interchange and its impact on local residents is a major political issue in the borough.

== Government ==
=== Municipal ===
The borough is divided into two municipal electoral districts:

- Saint-Paul–Émard–Saint-Henri-Ouest
- Saint-Henri-Est–Petite-Bourgogne–Pointe-Saint-Charles–Griffintown

The composition of the borough council changed entirely following the 2025 municipal election, and consists of the following councillors:

District	Position	Name	Party
—	Borough mayor City councillor	Véronique Fournier	Projet Montréal
Saint-Henri-Est–Petite-Bourgogne– Pointe-Saint-Charles–Griffintown	City councillor	Catherine Houbart	Projet Montréal
Saint-Henri-Est–Petite-Bourgogne– Pointe-Saint-Charles–Griffintown	Borough councillor	Jonathan Burnham	Projet Montréal
Saint-Paul–Émard–Saint-Henri-Ouest	City councillor	Élise Tanguay	Projet Montréal
Saint-Paul–Émard–Saint-Henri-Ouest	Borough councillor	Nicolas Jolicœur	Projet Montréal

=== Provincial ===
The bulk of the borough constitutes the provincial electoral district of Saint-Henri–Sainte-Anne; the industrial and railway area in the northeast is in the district of Notre-Dame-de-Grâce.

=== Federal ===
The borough is divided among the following federal ridings:

- Ville-Marie—Le Sud-Ouest—Île-des-Sœurs (Saint-Henri, Pointe-Saint-Charles, Little Burgundy, Griffintown, part of Côte-Saint-Paul)
- LaSalle—Émard—Verdun (Ville-Émard, part of Côte-Saint-Paul)

== Demographics ==
Historical populations
Year	Pop.	±%
1966	111,906	—
1971	95,675	−14.5%
1976	78,277	−18.2%
1981	68,911	−12.0%
1986	68,180	−1.1%
1991	67,929	−0.4%
1996	66,695	−1.8%
2001	66,474	−0.3%
2006	69,860	+5.1%
2011	71,546	+2.4%
2016	78,151	+9.2%
2021	84,553	+8.2%

Home language (2016)
Language	Population	Percentage (%)
French	42,620	60%
English	18,435	26%
Other languages	10,440	14%

Mother tongue (2016)
Language	Population	Percentage (%)
French	41,330	56%
English	14,270	19%
Other languages	18,210	25%

Visible Minorities (2016)
Ethnicity	Population	Percentage (%)
Not a visible minority	55,080	72.1%
Visible minorities	21,305	27.9%

== Infrastructure ==
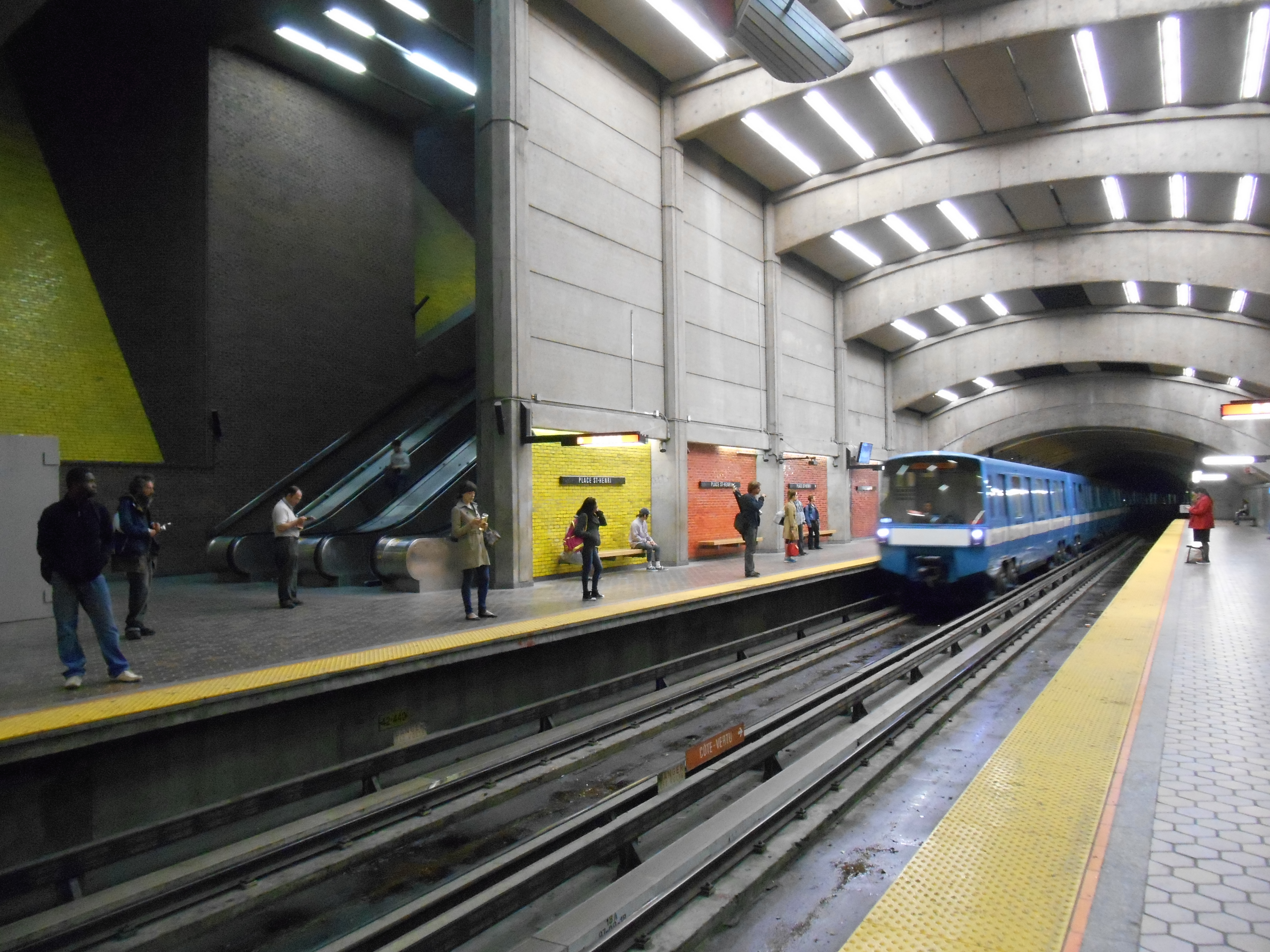
Place-Saint-Henri metro station.

=== Transport ===
The borough is served by the green and orange lines of the Montreal Metro, including Place-Saint-Henri, Lionel-Groulx, Charlevoix, Angrignon, Georges-Vanier, Monk, and Jolicoeur stations.

The borough is traversed and partly delimited by Quebec Autoroutes 15 (Décarie Aut.) and 20 (Ville-Marie Aut.); Autoroute 10 (Bonaventure Aut.) also passes through it. The Montreal ends of the Champlain Bridge and Victoria Bridge lie in Le Sud-Ouest, as does the Turcot Interchange (autoroutes 15 and 20), Quebec's largest highway interchange. The CN rail lines exiting Central Station pass through the borough.

Major thoroughfares include Notre Dame St., Laurendeau St., St. Patrick St., La Vérendrye Blvd., De l'Église St., Monk Blvd., Centre St., Charlevoix St., Wellington St., Atwater Ave., and Guy St.

The Lachine Canal is crossed by the Boul. Monk, Rue Charlevoix, Rue des Seigneurs, and Rue Wellington bridges and by the Saint Rémi and Atwater tunnels.

Bicycle paths run along the Lachine Canal, through the Parc du Premier-Chemin-de-Fer and Rue Lionel-Groulx, and through Pointe-Saint-Charles. Pedestrian- and cyclist-only bridges across the canal are located at the Saint-Gabriel Locks, the Atwater Market, Gédéon de Catalogne Park (rue Beaudoin), and Rue de l'Église.

=== Culture and recreation ===
The two largest green spaces in the borough are the Lachine Canal and its recreational facilities (including the Lachine Canal National Historic Site of Canada), and Angrignon Park in Ville-Émard. Other important parks include Ignace Bourget Park (Ville-Émard), Sir George-Étienne Cartier Square and Saint-Henri Park (Saint-Henri), Vinet Park and Oscar Peterson Park (Little Burgundy), and Saint-Gabriel Park, Marguerite Bourgeoys Park, and Le Ber Park (Pointe-Saint-Charles).

The borough boasts numerous historic buildings, such as the Maison Saint-Gabriel (built in 1698), the former Negro Community Centre, the Atwater Market, Union United Church, Corona Theatre, the Atwater pumping station, the Saint-Henri fire hall, and the area's churches. In Saint-Henri, the Musée des ondes Emile Berliner tells the story of the radio and phonograph industry in the historic RCA Victor building.

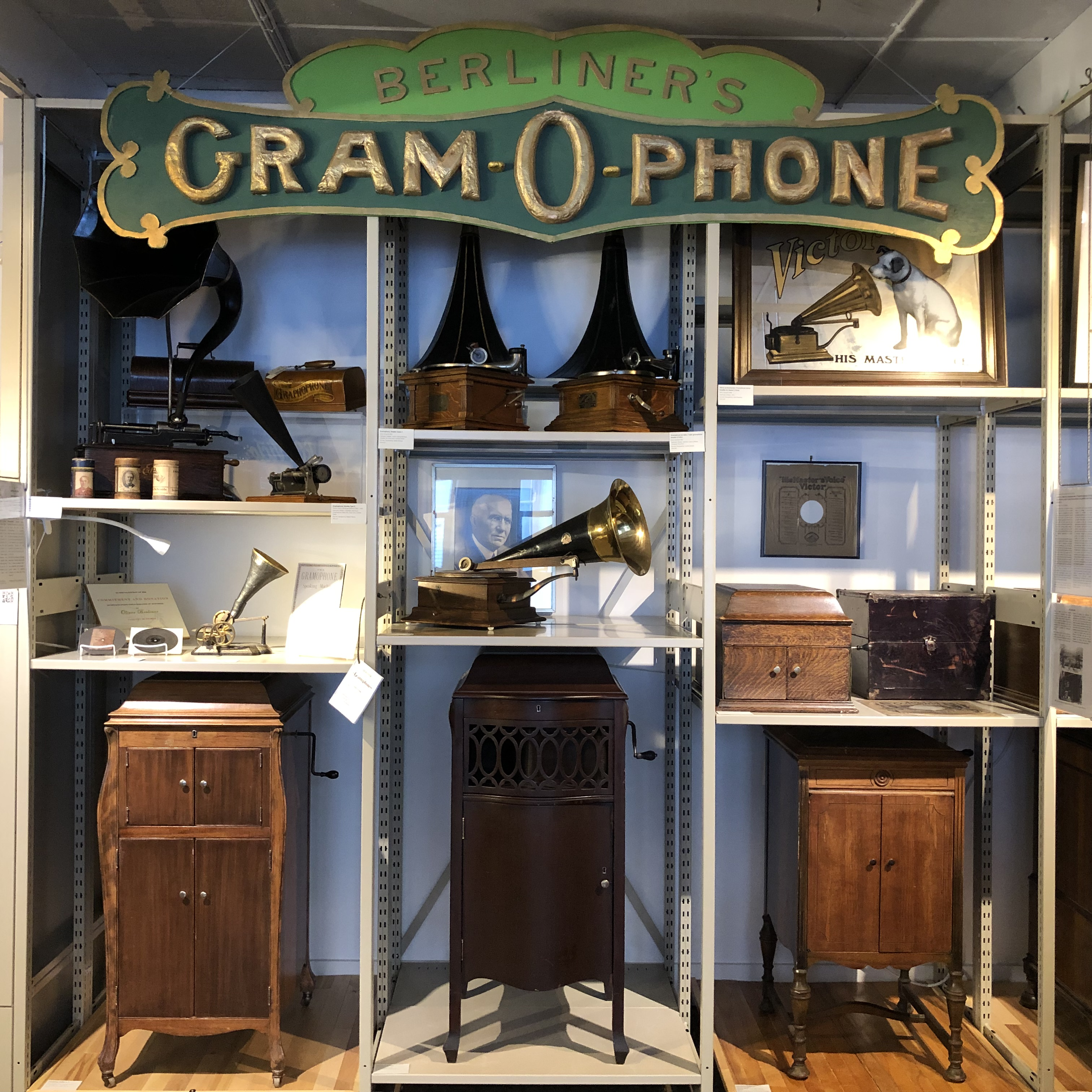
The Musée des ondes Emile Berliner shows gramophones produced in Saint Henri

The borough's community centres include the Centre Saint-Zotique, the Centre d'éducation populaire (CEDA), Tyndale-St. George's Community Centre, Maison Saint-Charles, and Centre Monseigneur-Pigeon. It is served by four libraries: Marie-Uguay, Saint-Henri, Georges-Vanier, and Saint-Charles. Sporting facilities include the Complexe récréatif Gadbois, one of the largest on the island, as well as the Piscine Émard, Piscine Saint-Henri, Centre sportif de la Petite-Bourgogne, and Piscine Saint-Charles.

=== Institutions ===
The territory of Le Sud-Ouest is served by the Centre de santé et des services sociaux du Sud-Ouest–Verdun, which operates the CLSCs Saint-Henri and Ville-Émard–Côte-Saint-Paul. The Clinique communautaire Pointe-Saint-Charles, though it inspired the CLSC system and is the provider of CLSC services for Pointe-Saint-Charles, continues to operate independently of the CLSC system. The nearest hospitals are the Hôpital de Verdun, Hôpital de LaSalle and the McGill University Health Centre superhospital is immediately northwest of the borough.

=== Centre Sportif de la Petite-Bourgogne ===
Opened in 1997, the building was built at a cost of $8.6 million by neighborhood residents striving to overcome the lack of activities and sports facilities in the area.

Its funding was arranged by three parties: the federal and provincial governments have contributed $4 million and the City of Montreal invested $4.6 million.

During the opening, the mayor, Pierre Bourque, officially transferred the facility and equipment management to the Little Burgundy Sports Center Corporation, chaired at the time by Mrs. Léonie Charles.

Managed independently, the Little Burgundy Sport Center is represented by the board of directors and a management team that works in partnership with the South West district, City of Montreal.

=== Commerce ===
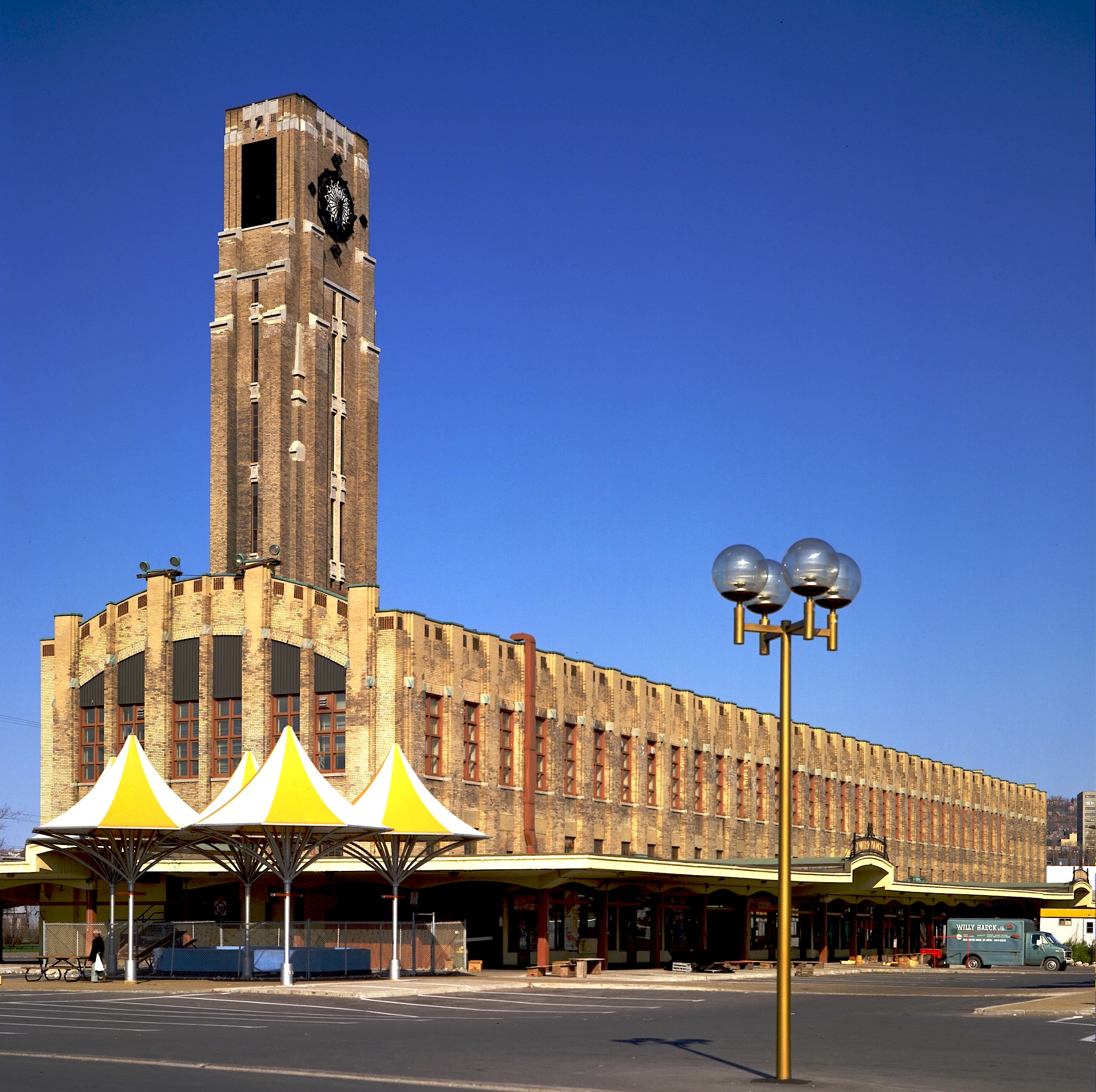
The Atwater Market, in the Saint-Henri neighbourhood.

Major commercial streets include Boulevard Monk (Ville-Émard), Avenue de l'Église (Côte Saint-Paul), Rue du Centre (Pointe-Saint-Charles), and Rue Notre-Dame (Saint-Henri and Little Burgundy). Rue Notre-Dame in Little Burgundy was once notable as a centre for antiques dealers.

The Atwater Market, is located beside the Lachine Canal. Joe Beef Restaurant is on Notre Dame Street West in Little Burgundy.

== Education ==
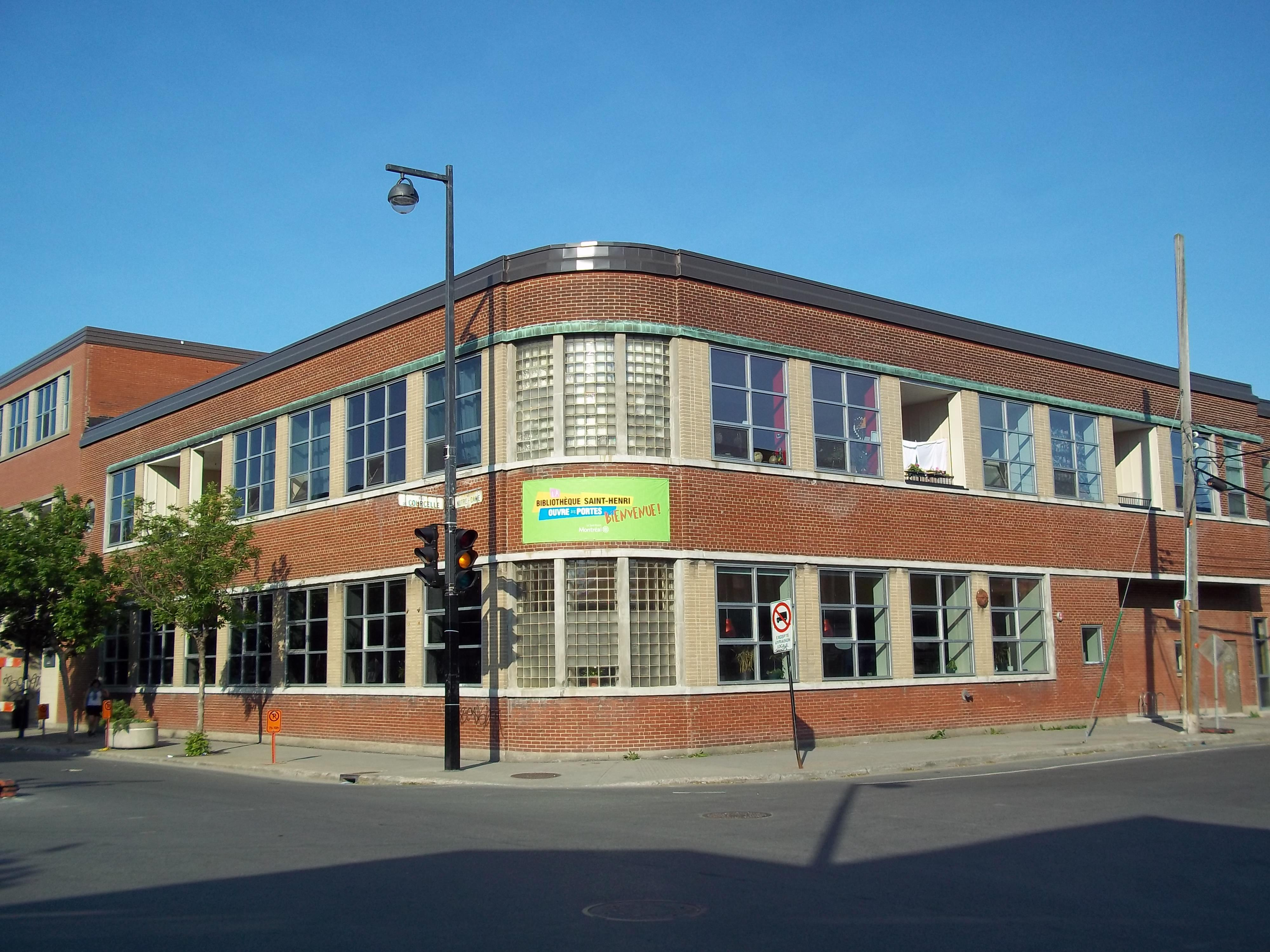
Saint-Henri Library

The Commission scolaire de Montréal (CSDM) operates Francophone public schools.

The English Montreal School Board (EMSB) operates Anglophone public schools.

The Montreal Public Libraries Network operates four libraries: Réjean-Ducharme, Marie-Uguay, Saint-Charles, and Saint-Henri.

The borough is home to the École de technologie supérieure technical university.

=== Bibliothèque Réjean-Ducharme ===
This library, more than 100 years old, was the first French-language public library erected in Canada and is the oldest branch still in operation in the city. It was forced to close in 1918 after the First World War for budget reasons, but in 1947, thanks to the determination of Georges Vanier, it reopened as the Workman library.

== See also ==
- Boroughs of Montreal
- Districts of Montreal
- Griffintown
- Municipal reorganization in Quebec
