= April 3 =

April 3 this year in various calendars
- Friday, 3 April 2026
Akan	Kwafie
Armenian	17 Ahekani 1475
Aztec	Tlaxochimaco 3, 6 Ozomahtli
Babylonian	14 Adaru, 2336 SE
Balinese pawukon	Menga, Beteng, Jaya, Keliwon, Was, Sukra of Watugunung, Kala, Tulus, Sri
Bengali	20 Chaitro, BS 1432
Chinese	Yin Fire Goat・Neck Mansion; Fire Horse Year, Month 2, Day 16 (Chunfen, 2 days until Qingming)
Common Era	3 April 2026 CE
Coptic	25 Paremhat, AM 1742
Egyptian	22 Mesori, 2774 NE
Ethiopian	25 Magābit, 2018 Amätä Məhrät
French Republican	Décade II, Quartidi de Germinal de l'Année 234 de la République
Gregorian	3 April, AD 2026
Hebrew	16 Nisan, AM 5786; Omer 1
Hindu	Citrā・Vyāghāta; Solar: 21 Caitra, 1947 SE; Lunisolar: Pratipada, Kṛishna pakṣa of Caitra, 2083 VE; Rāudra・5126 KY・1,872,668
Icelandic	Föstudagur, 11 Einmánuður 2025
Islamic	15 Shawwal, AH 1447 (using tabular method)
ISO week date	2026-W14-5
Japanese	16 Kisaragi, Reiwa 8 (Shunbun, 2 days until Seimei)
Julian	21 March, AD 2026 (AM 7534)
Julian day	2461134
Korean	16 Tokkidal, 4359 DE
Maya	13.0.13.8.11; 4 Pop, 6 Chuen
Roman	ante diem XII Kalendas Apriles, MMDCCLXXIX AUC
Solar Hijri	14 Farvardin, SH 1405
Tibetan	17 dbo, me pho rta 2153 or 1772 or 1000

<<	April					>>
Su	Mo	Tu	We	Th	Fr	Sa
			1	2	3	4
5	6	7	8	9	10	11
12	13	14	15	16	17	18
19	20	21	22	23	24	25
26	27	28	29	30
2026

April 3 in recent years
2026 (Friday)
2025 (Thursday)
2024 (Wednesday)
2023 (Monday)
2022 (Sunday)
2021 (Saturday)
2020 (Friday)
2019 (Wednesday)
2018 (Tuesday)
2017 (Monday)

April 3 is the 93rd day of the year (94th in leap years) in the Gregorian calendar; 272 days remain until the end of the year.

== Events ==
=== Pre-1600 ===
- 686 – Maya king Yuknoom Yich'aak K'ahk' assumes the crown of Calakmul.
- 956 – Polyeuctus of Constantinople is elected as patriarch of Constantinople.
- 1043 – Edward the Confessor is crowned King of England.
- 1077 – The Patriarchate of Friûl, the first Friulian state, is created.
- 1559 – The second of two treaties making up the Peace of Cateau-Cambrésis is signed, ending the Italian Wars.
- 1589 – The janissaries revolt in response to the debasement of coins.

=== 1601–1900 ===
- 1721 – Robert Walpole becomes, in effect, the first Prime Minister of Great Britain, though he himself denied that title.
- 1851 – Rama IV is crowned King of Thailand after the death of his half-brother, Rama III.
- 1860 – The first successful United States Pony Express run from St. Joseph, Missouri, to Sacramento, California, begins.
- 1865 – American Civil War: Union forces capture Richmond, Virginia, the capital of the Confederate States of America.
- 1882 – American Old West: Robert Ford kills Jesse James.
- 1885 – Gottlieb Daimler is granted a German patent for a light, high-speed, four-stroke engine, which he uses seven months later to create the world's first motorcycle, the Daimler Reitwagen.
- 1888 – Jack the Ripper: The first of 11 unsolved brutal murders of women committed in or near the impoverished Whitechapel district in the East End of London, occurs.
- 1895 – The trial in the libel case brought by Oscar Wilde begins, eventually resulting in his imprisonment on charges of homosexuality.

=== 1901–present ===
- 1905 – Association football club Boca Juniors is founded in Buenos Aires, Argentina
- 1920 – Attempts are made to carry out the failed assassination attempt on General Mannerheim, led by Aleksander Weckman by order of Eino Rahja, during the White Guard parade in Tampere, Finland.
- 1922 – Joseph Stalin becomes the first General Secretary of the Communist Party of the Soviet Union.
- 1933 – First flight over Mount Everest, the British Houston-Mount Everest Flight Expedition, led by the Marquis of Clydesdale and funded by Lucy, Lady Houston.
- 1936 – Bruno Richard Hauptmann is executed for the kidnapping and death of Charles Augustus Lindbergh Jr., the infant son of pilot Charles Lindbergh.
- 1942 – World War II: Japanese forces begin an assault on the United States and Filipino troops on the Bataan Peninsula.
- 1946 – Japanese Lt. General Masaharu Homma is executed in the Philippines for leading the Bataan Death March.
- 1948 – Cold War: U.S. President Harry S. Truman signs the Marshall Plan, authorizing $5 billion in aid for 16 countries.
- 1948 – In Jeju Province, South Korea, a civil-war-like period of violence and human rights abuses known as the Jeju uprising begins.
- 1955 – The American Civil Liberties Union announces it will defend Allen Ginsberg's book Howl against obscenity charges.
- 1956 – Hudsonville–Standale tornado: The western half of the Lower Peninsula of Michigan is struck by a deadly F5 tornado.
- 1961 – LAN-Chile Flight 621 crashes in the Andes mountains, killing 21 people, including Argentinian football player Eliseo Mouriño.
- 1968 – Martin Luther King Jr. delivers his "I've Been to the Mountaintop" speech; he was assassinated the next day.
- 1969 – Vietnam War: United States Secretary of Defense Melvin Laird announces that the United States will start to "Vietnamize" the war effort.
- 1973 – Martin Cooper of Motorola makes the first handheld mobile phone call to Joel S. Engel of Bell Labs.
- 1974 – The 1974 Super Outbreak occurs, the second largest tornado outbreak in recorded history (after the 2011 Super Outbreak). The death toll is 315, with nearly 5,500 injured.
- 1975 – Vietnam War: Operation Babylift, a mass evacuation of children in the closing stages of the war begins.
- 1975 – Bobby Fischer refuses to play in a chess match against Anatoly Karpov, giving Karpov the title of World Champion by default.
- 1980 – US Congress restores a federal trust relationship with the 501 members of the Shivwits, Kanosh, Koosharem, and the Indian Peaks and Cedar City bands of the Paiute people of Utah.
- 1981 – The Osborne 1, the first successful portable computer, is unveiled at the West Coast Computer Faire in San Francisco.
- 1989 – The US Supreme Court upholds the jurisdictional rights of tribal courts under the Indian Child Welfare Act of 1978 in Mississippi Choctaw Band v. Holyfield.
- 1993 – The outcome of the Grand National horse race is declared void for the first (and only) time.
- 1996 – Suspected "Unabomber" Theodore Kaczynski is captured at his Montana cabin in the United States.
- 1996 – A United States Air Force Boeing T-43 crashes near Dubrovnik Airport in Croatia, killing 35, including Secretary of Commerce Ron Brown.
- 1997 – The Thalit massacre begins in Algeria; all but one of the 53 inhabitants of Thalit are killed by guerrillas.
- 2000 – United States v. Microsoft Corp.: Microsoft is ruled to have violated United States antitrust law by keeping "an oppressive thumb" on its competitors.
- 2004 – Islamic terrorists involved in the 2004 Madrid train bombings are trapped by the police in their apartment and kill themselves.
- 2007 – Conventional-Train World Speed Record: A French TGV train on the LGV Est high speed line sets an official new world speed record of 574.8 km/h (159.6 m/s, 357.2 mph).
- 2008 – ATA Airlines, once one of the ten largest U.S. passenger airlines and largest charter airline, files for bankruptcy for the second time in five years and ceases all operations.
- 2008 – Texas law enforcement cordons off the FLDS's YFZ Ranch. Eventually 533 women and children will be taken into state custody.
- 2009 – Jiverly Antares Wong opens fire at the American Civic Association immigration center in Binghamton, New York, killing thirteen and wounding four before committing suicide.
- 2010 – Apple Inc. released the first generation iPad, a tablet computer.
- 2013 – More than 50 people die in floods resulting from record-breaking rainfall in La Plata and Buenos Aires, Argentina.
- 2016 – The Panama Papers, a leak of legal documents, reveals information on 214,488 offshore companies.
- 2017 – A bomb explodes in the St Petersburg metro system, killing 14 and injuring several more people.
- 2018 – YouTube headquarters shooting: A 38-year-old gunwoman opens fire at YouTube Headquarters in San Bruno, California, injuring three people before committing suicide.

== Births ==
=== Pre-1600 ===
- 1016 – Xing Zong, Chinese emperor (died 1055)
- 1151 – Igor Svyatoslavich, Kievan Rus' prince (died 1202)
- 1395 – George of Trebizond, Greek philosopher, scholar and humanist (died 1486)
- 1438 – John III of Egmont, Dutch nobleman (died 1516)
- 1529 – Michael Neander, German mathematician and astronomer (died 1581)
- 1540 – Maria de' Medici, Italian noblewoman, the eldest daughter of Cosimo I de' Medici, Grand Duke of Tuscany and Eleonora di Toledo. (died 1557)
- 1593 – George Herbert, English poet (died 1633)

=== 1601–1900 ===
- 1643 – Charles V, duke of Lorraine (died 1690)
- 1682 – Valentin Rathgeber, German organist and composer (died 1750)
- 1693 – George Edwards, English ornithologist and entomologist (died 1773)
- 1715 – William Watson, English physician, physicist, and botanist (died 1787)
- 1764 – John Abernethy, English surgeon and anatomist (died 1831)
- 1769 – Christian Günther von Bernstorff, Danish-Prussian politician and diplomat (died 1835)
- 1770 – Theodoros Kolokotronis, Greek general (died 1843)
- 1778 – Pierre Bretonneau, French doctor who performed the first successful tracheotomy (died 1862)
- 1781 – Swaminarayan, Indian religious leader (died 1830)
- 1782 – Alexander Macomb, American general (died 1841)
- 1783 – Washington Irving, American short story writer, essayist, biographer, historian (died 1859)
- 1791 – Anne Lister, English diarist, mountaineer, and traveller (died 1840)
- 1798 – Charles Wilkes, American admiral, geographer, and explorer (died 1877)
- 1807 – Mary Carpenter, English educational and social reformer (died 1877)
- 1814 – Lorenzo Snow, American religious leader, 5th President of The Church of Jesus Christ of Latter-day Saints (died 1901)
- 1822 – Edward Everett Hale, American minister, historian, and author (died 1909)
- 1823 – George Derby, American lieutenant and journalist (died 1861)
- 1823 – William M. Tweed, American politician (died 1878)
- 1826 – Cyrus K. Holliday, American businessman (died 1900)
- 1837 – John Burroughs, American botanist and author (died 1921)
- 1842 – Ulric Dahlgren, American colonel (died 1864)
- 1848 – Arturo Prat, Chilean lawyer and captain (died 1879)
- 1852 – Talbot Baines Reed, English author (died 1893)
- 1858 – Jacob Gaudaur, Canadian rower (died 1937)
- 1860 – Frederik van Eeden, Dutch psychiatrist and author (died 1932)
- 1864 – Emil Kellenberger, Swiss target shooter (died 1943)
- 1875 – Mistinguett, French actress and singer (died 1956)
- 1876 – Margaret Anglin, Canadian actress, director, and producer (died 1958)
- 1876 – Tomáš Baťa, Czech businessman, founded Bata Shoes (died 1932)
- 1880 – Otto Weininger, Jewish-Austrian philosopher and author (died 1903)
- 1881 – Alcide De Gasperi, Italian journalist and politician, 30th Prime Minister of Italy (died 1954)
- 1882 – Philippe Desranleau, Canadian archbishop (died 1952)
- 1883 – Ikki Kita, Japanese philosopher and author (died 1937)
- 1885 – Allan Dwan, Canadian-American director, producer, and screenwriter (died 1981)
- 1885 – Bud Fisher, American cartoonist (died 1954)
- 1885 – Marie-Victorin Kirouac, Canadian botanist and academic (died 1944)
- 1885 – St John Philby, English colonial and explorer (died 1960)
- 1886 – Dooley Wilson, American actor and singer (died 1953)
- 1887 – Ōtori Tanigorō, Japanese sumo wrestler, the 24th Yokozuna (died 1956)
- 1887 – Nishizō Tsukahara, Japanese admiral (died 1966)
- 1888 – Thomas C. Kinkaid, American admiral (died 1972)
- 1889 – Grigoraș Dinicu, Romanian violinist and composer (died 1949)
- 1893 – Leslie Howard, English actor (died 1943)
- 1895 – Mario Castelnuovo-Tedesco, Italian-American composer and educator (died 1968)
- 1895 – Zez Confrey, American pianist and composer (died 1971)
- 1897 – Joe Kirkwood Sr., Australian golfer (died 1970)
- 1897 – Thrasyvoulos Tsakalotos, Greek general (died 1989)
- 1898 – David Jack, English footballer and manager (died 1958)
- 1898 – George Jessel, American actor, singer, and producer (died 1981)
- 1898 – Henry Luce, American publisher, co-founded Time magazine (died 1967)
- 1900 – Camille Chamoun, Lebanese lawyer and politician, 7th President of Lebanon (died 1987)
- 1900 – Albert Walsh, Canadian lawyer and politician, 1st Lieutenant Governor of Newfoundland (died 1958)

=== 1901–present ===
- 1903 – Kamaladevi Chattopadhyay, Indian social reformer and freedom fighter (died 1988)
- 1904 – Iron Eyes Cody, American actor and stuntman (died 1999)
- 1904 – Sally Rand, American dancer (died 1979)
- 1904 – Russel Wright, American furniture designer (died 1976)
- 1905 – Robert Sink, American general (died 1965)
- 1910 – Ted Hook, Australian public servant (died 1990)
- 1911 – Nanette Bordeaux, Canadian-American actress (died 1956)
- 1911 – Michael Woodruff, English-Scottish surgeon and academic (died 2001)
- 1911 – Stanisława Walasiewicz, Polish-American runner (died 1980)
- 1912 – Dorothy Eden, New Zealand-English author (died 1982)
- 1912 – Grigoris Lambrakis, Greek physician and politician (died 1963)
- 1913 – Per Borten, Norwegian politician, 18th Prime Minister of Norway (died 2005)
- 1914 – Ray Getliffe, Canadian ice hockey player (died 2008)
- 1914 – Sam Manekshaw, Indian field marshal (died 2008)
- 1915 – Piet de Jong, Dutch politician and naval officer, Prime Minister of the Netherlands (died 2016)
- 1915 – İhsan Doğramacı, Turkish physician and academic (died 2010)
- 1916 – Herb Caen, American journalist and author (died 1997)
- 1916 – Cliff Gladwin, English cricketer (died 1988)
- 1916 – Louis Guglielmi, Catalan composer (died 1991)
- 1918 – Mary Anderson, American actress (died 2014)
- 1918 – Louis Applebaum, Canadian composer and conductor (died 2000)
- 1919 – Ervin Drake, American songwriter and composer (died 2015)
- 1919 – Clairette Oddera, French-Canadian actress and singer (died 2008)
- 1920 – Stan Freeman, American composer and conductor (died 2001)
- 1920 – Yoshibayama Junnosuke, Japanese sumo wrestler, the 43rd Yokozuna (died 1977)
- 1921 – Robert Karvelas, American actor (died 1991)
- 1921 – Jan Sterling, American actress (died 2004)
- 1922 – Yevhen Bulanchyk, Ukrainian hurdler (died 1996)
- 1922 – Doris Day, American singer and actress (died 2019)
- 1923 – Daniel Hoffman, American poet and academic (died 2013)
- 1924 – Marlon Brando, American actor and director (died 2004)
- 1924 – Roza Shanina, Russian sergeant and sniper (died 1945)
- 1925 – Tony Benn, English pilot and politician, Secretary of State for Industry (died 2014)
- 1926 – Alex Grammas, American baseball player, manager, and coach (died 2019)
- 1926 – Gus Grissom, American colonel, pilot, and astronaut (died 1967)
- 1927 – Wesley A. Brown, American general and engineer (died 2012)
- 1928 – Don Gibson, American singer-songwriter and guitarist (died 2003)
- 1928 – Emmett Johns, Canadian priest, founded Dans la Rue (died 2018)
- 1928 – Earl Lloyd, American basketball player and coach (died 2015)
- 1928 – Jennifer Paterson, English chef and television personality (died 1999)
- 1929 – Fazlur Rahman Khan, Bangladeshi engineer and architect, co-designed the Willis Tower and John Hancock Center (died 1982)
- 1929 – Poul Schlüter, Danish lawyer and politician, 37th Prime Minister of Denmark (died 2021)
- 1930 – Lawton Chiles, American soldier, lawyer, and politician, 41st Governor of Florida (died 1998)
- 1930 – Helmut Kohl, German politician, Chancellor of Germany (died 2017)
- 1930 – Mario Benjamín Menéndez, Argentinian general and politician (died 2015)
- 1930 – Wally Moon, American baseball player and coach (died 2018)
- 1931 – William Bast, American screenwriter and author (died 2015)
- 1933 – Bob Dornan, American politician
- 1933 – Rod Funseth, American golfer (died 1985)
- 1934 – Pamela Allen, New Zealand children's writer and illustrator
- 1934 – Jane Goodall, English primatologist and anthropologist (died 2025)
- 1934 – Jim Parker, American football player (died 2005)
- 1935 – Harold Kushner, American rabbi and author (died 2023)
- 1936 – Jimmy McGriff, American organist and bandleader (died 2008)
- 1936 – Harold Vick, American saxophonist and flute player (died 1987)
- 1938 – Jeff Barry, American singer-songwriter, and producer
- 1938 – Phil Rodgers, American golfer (died 2018)
- 1939 – François de Roubaix, French composer (died 1975)
- 1939 – Hawk Taylor, American baseball player and coach (died 2012)
- 1939 – Paul Craig Roberts, American economist and politician
- 1941 – Jan Berry, American singer-songwriter (died 2004)
- 1941 – Philippé Wynne, American soul singer (died 1984)
- 1942 – Marsha Mason, American actress
- 1942 – Wayne Newton, American singer
- 1942 – Billy Joe Royal, American singer-songwriter and guitarist (died 2015)
- 1943 – Mario Lavista, Mexican composer (died 2021)
- 1943 – Jonathan Lynn, English actor, director, and screenwriter
- 1943 – Richard Manuel, Canadian singer-songwriter and pianist (died 1986)
- 1943 – Hikaru Saeki, Japanese admiral, the first female star officer of the Japan Self-Defense Forces
- 1944 – Peter Colman, Australian biologist and academic
- 1944 – Tony Orlando, American singer
- 1945 – Doon Arbus, American author and journalist
- 1945 – Bernie Parent, Canadian ice hockey player and coach (died 2025)
- 1945 – Catherine Spaak, French actress (died 2022)
- 1946 – Nicholas Jones, English actor
- 1946 – Dee Murray, English bass player (died 1992)
- 1946 – Marisa Paredes, Spanish film actress (died 2024)
- 1946 – Hanna Suchocka, Polish politician, Prime Minister of Poland
- 1947 – Anders Eliasson, Swedish composer (died 2013)
- 1948 – Arlette Cousture, Canadian author and screenwriter
- 1948 – Jaap de Hoop Scheffer, Dutch academic, politician, and diplomat, 11th Secretary General of NATO
- 1948 – Hans-Georg Schwarzenbeck, German footballer
- 1948 – Carlos Salinas de Gortari, Mexican economist and politician, 53rd President of Mexico
- 1949 – Lyle Alzado, American football player and actor (died 1992)
- 1949 – A. C. Grayling, English philosopher and academic
- 1949 – Richard Thompson, English singer-songwriter and guitarist
- 1950 – Indrajit Coomaraswamy, Sri Lankan cricketer and economist
- 1951 – Brendan Barber, English trade union leader
- 1951 – Annette Dolphin, British academician and educator
- 1951 – Mitch Woods, American singer-songwriter and pianist
- 1952 – Mike Moore, American lawyer and politician
- 1953 – Sandra Boynton, American author and illustrator
- 1953 – Wakanohana Kanji II, Japanese sumo wrestler, the 56th Yokozuna (died 2022)
- 1953 – James Smith, American boxer
- 1954 – Elisabetta Brusa, Italian composer
- 1954 – K. Krishnasamy, Indian physician and politician
- 1956 – Kalle Kulbok, Estonian politician
- 1956 – Boris Miljković, Serbian director and producer
- 1956 – Miguel Bosé, Spanish musician and actor
- 1956 – Ray Combs, American game show host (died 1996)
- 1958 – Alec Baldwin, American actor, comedian, producer and television host
- 1958 – Adam Gussow, American scholar, musician, and memoirist
- 1958 – Francesca Woodman, American photographer (died 1981)
- 1959 – David Hyde Pierce, American actor and activist
- 1960 – Arjen Anthony Lucassen, Dutch singer-songwriter, guitarist, and producer
- 1961 – Tim Crews, American baseball player (died 1993)
- 1961 – Eddie Murphy, American actor and comedian
- 1962 – Dave Miley, American baseball player and manager
- 1962 – Mike Ness, American singer-songwriter and guitarist
- 1962 – Jaya Prada, Indian actress and politician
- 1963 – Les Davidson, Australian rugby league player
- 1963 – Ricky Nixon, Australian footballer and manager
- 1963 – Criss Oliva, American guitarist and songwriter (died 1993)
- 1964 – Marco Ballotta, Italian footballer and manager
- 1964 – Nigel Farage, English politician
- 1964 – Claire Perry, English banker and politician
- 1964 – Bjarne Riis, Danish cyclist and manager
- 1964 – Andy Robinson, English rugby player and coach
- 1964 – Jay Weatherill, Australian politician, 45th Premier of South Australia
- 1965 – Nazia Hassan, Pakistani pop singer-songwriter, lawyer and social activist (died 2000)
- 1966 – John de Vries, Australian race car driver
- 1967 – Cat Cora, American chef and author
- 1967 – Pervis Ellison, American basketball player
- 1967 – Brent Gilchrist, Canadian ice hockey player
- 1967 – Cristi Puiu, Romanian director and screenwriter
- 1967 – Mark Skaife, Australian race car driver and sportscaster
- 1968 – Sebastian Bach, Bahamian-Canadian singer-songwriter and actor
- 1968 – Charlotte Coleman, English actress (died 2001)
- 1968 – Jamie Hewlett, English director and performer
- 1968 – Tomoaki Kanemoto, Japanese baseball player
- 1969 – Rodney Hampton, American football player
- 1969 – Peter Matera, Australian footballer and coach
- 1969 – Ben Mendelsohn, Australian actor
- 1969 – Lance Storm, Canadian wrestler and trainer
- 1971 – Vitālijs Astafjevs, Latvian footballer and manager
- 1971 – Emmanuel Collard, French race car driver
- 1971 – Picabo Street, American skier
- 1972 – Jennie Garth, American actress and director
- 1972 – Catherine McCormack, English actress
- 1972 – Sandrine Testud, French tennis player
- 1973 – Nilesh Kulkarni, Indian cricketer
- 1973 – Adam Scott, American actor
- 1974 – Marcus Brown, American basketball player
- 1974 – Lee Williams, Welsh model and actor
- 1975 – Shawn Bates, American ice hockey player
- 1975 – Michael Olowokandi, Nigerian-American basketball player
- 1975 – Aries Spears, American comedian and actor
- 1975 – Yoshinobu Takahashi, Japanese baseball player
- 1975 – Koji Uehara, Japanese baseball player
- 1976 – Nicolas Escudé, French tennis player
- 1978 – Matthew Goode, English actor
- 1978 – Tommy Haas, German-American tennis player
- 1978 – John Smit, South African rugby player
- 1979 – Simon Black, Australian footballer and coach
- 1980 – Andrei Lodis, Belarusian footballer
- 1980 – Megan Rohrer, American pastor and transgender activist
- 1981 – Aaron Bertram, American trumpet player
- 1981 – DeShawn Stevenson, American basketball player
- 1982 – Jared Allen, American football player
- 1982 – Iain Fyfe, Australian footballer
- 1982 – Cobie Smulders, Canadian actress
- 1983 – Ben Foster, English footballer
- 1983 – Stephen Weiss, Canadian ice hockey player
- 1984 – Jonathan Blondel, Belgian footballer
- 1984 – Maxi López, Argentinian footballer
- 1985 – Jari-Matti Latvala, Finnish race car driver
- 1985 – Leona Lewis, English singer-songwriter and producer
- 1986 – Amanda Bynes, American actress
- 1986 – Stephanie Cox, American soccer player
- 1986 – Annalisa Cucinotta, Italian cyclist
- 1986 – Sergio Sánchez Ortega, Spanish footballer
- 1987 – Rachel Bloom, American actress, writer, and producer
- 1987 – Jay Bruce, American baseball player
- 1987 – Yileen Gordon, Australian rugby league player
- 1987 – Jason Kipnis, American baseball player
- 1987 – Martyn Rooney, English sprinter
- 1987 – Julie Sokolow, American singer-songwriter and guitarist
- 1987 – Yuval Spungin, Israeli footballer
- 1988 – Kam Chancellor, American football player
- 1988 – Brandon Graham, American football player
- 1988 – Peter Hartley, English footballer
- 1988 – Tim Krul, Dutch footballer
- 1989 – Romain Alessandrini, French footballer
- 1989 – Israel Folau, Australian rugby player and footballer
- 1989 – Joel Romelo, Australian rugby league player
- 1989 – Thisara Perera, Sri Lankan cricketer
- 1990 – Karim Ansarifard, Iranian footballer
- 1990 – Madison Brengle, American tennis player
- 1990 – Sotiris Ninis, Greek footballer
- 1990 – Natasha Negovanlis, Canadian actress and singer
- 1991 – Hayley Kiyoko, American actress and singer
- 1992 – Simone Benedetti, Italian footballer
- 1992 – Yuliya Yefimova, Russian swimmer
- 1993 – Pape Moussa Konaté, Senegalese footballer
- 1994 – Kodi Nikorima, New Zealand rugby league player
- 1994 – Dylann Roof, American mass murderer
- 1996 – Mayo Hibi, Japanese tennis player
- 1997 – Gabriel Jesus, Brazilian footballer
- 1997 – Zhao Xintong, Chinese snooker player
- 1998 – Paris Jackson, American actress, model and singer
- 1998 – Seonghwa, South Korean singer
- 1999 – Chanel Harris-Tavita, New Zealand-Samoan rugby league player

== Deaths ==
=== Pre-1600 ===
- 33 – Jesus of Nazareth , (Julian Calendar Date)
- 963 – William III, Duke of Aquitaine (born 915)
- 1153 – al-Adil ibn al-Sallar, vizier of the Fatimid Caliphate
- 1171 – Philip of Milly, seventh Grand Master of the Knights Templar (born c. 1120)
- 1203 – Arthur I, Duke of Brittany (born 1187)
- 1253 – Saint Richard of Chichester
- 1287 – Pope Honorius IV (born 1210)
- 1325 – Nizamuddin Auliya, Sufi saint (born 1238)
- 1350 – Odo IV, Duke of Burgundy (born 1295)
- 1538 – Elizabeth Boleyn, Countess of Wiltshire (born 1480)
- 1545 – Antonio de Guevara, Spanish chronicler and moralist (born 1481)

=== 1601–1900 ===
- 1606 – Charles Blount, 8th Baron Mountjoy, English general and politician, Lord Lieutenant of Ireland (born 1563)
- 1630 – Christopher Villiers, 1st Earl of Anglesey, English noble (born c. 1593)
- 1637 – Joseph Yuspa Nördlinger Hahn, German rabbi
- 1680 – Chatrapati Shivaji Maharaj, Indian emperor, founded the Maratha Empire (born 1630)
- 1682 – Bartolomé Esteban Murillo, Spanish painter and educator (born 1618)
- 1691 – Jean Petitot, French-Swiss painter (born 1608)
- 1695 – Melchior d'Hondecoeter, Dutch painter (born 1636)
- 1717 – Jacques Ozanam, French mathematician and academic (born 1640)
- 1728 – James Anderson, Scottish lawyer and historian (born 1662)
- 1792 – George Pocock, English admiral (born 1706)
- 1804 – Jędrzej Kitowicz, Polish priest, historian, and author (born 1727)
- 1826 – Reginald Heber, English priest (born 1783)
- 1827 – Ernst Chladni, German physicist and academic (born 1756)
- 1838 – François Carlo Antommarchi, French physician and author (born 1780)
- 1844 – Edward Bigge, English cleric, 1st Archdeacon of Lindisfarne (born 1807)
- 1846 – William Braine, English soldier and explorer (born 1814)
- 1849 – Juliusz Słowacki, Polish-French poet and playwright (born 1809)
- 1868 – Franz Berwald, Swedish composer and surgeon (born 1796)
- 1880 – Felicita Vestvali, German actress and opera singer (born 1831)
- 1882 – Jesse James, American criminal and outlaw (born 1847)
- 1897 – Johannes Brahms, German pianist and composer (born 1833)

=== 1901–present ===
- 1901 – Richard D'Oyly Carte, English composer and talent agent (born 1844)
- 1902 – Esther Hobart Morris, American lawyer and judge (born 1814)
- 1930 – Emma Albani, Canadian-English operatic soprano (born 1847)
- 1936 – Richard Hauptmann, German-American murderer (born 1899)
- 1941 – Tachiyama Mineemon, Japanese sumo wrestler, the 22nd Yokozuna (born 1877)
- 1941 – Pál Teleki, Hungarian academic and politician, 22nd Prime Minister of Hungary (born 1879)
- 1943 – Conrad Veidt, German actor, director, and producer (born 1893)
- 1946 – Masaharu Homma, Japanese general (born 1887)
- 1950 – Kurt Weill, German-American composer and pianist (born 1900)
- 1950 – Carter G. Woodson, American historian, author, and journalist, founded Black History Month (born 1875)
- 1951 – Henrik Visnapuu, Estonian poet and playwright (born 1890)
- 1952 – Miina Sillanpää, Finnish minister and politician (born 1866)
- 1957 – Ned Sparks, Canadian-American actor (born 1883)
- 1958 – Jaan Kärner, Estonian poet and author (born 1891)
- 1962 – Manolis Kalomiris, Greek composer and educator (born 1883)
- 1970 – Avigdor Hameiri, Israeli author (born 1890)
- 1971 – Joseph Valachi, American gangster (born 1904)
- 1972 – Ferde Grofé, American pianist and composer (born 1892)
- 1975 – Mary Ure, Scottish-English actress (born 1933)
- 1976 – David M. Dennison, American physicist and academic (born 1900)
- 1976 – Claude-Henri Grignon, Canadian journalist and politician (born 1894)
- 1978 – Ray Noble, English bandleader, composer, and actor (born 1903)
- 1978 – Winston Sharples, American composer (born 1909)
- 1981 – Juan Trippe, American businessman, founded Pan American World Airways (born 1899)
- 1982 – Warren Oates, American actor (born 1928)
- 1983 – Jimmy Bloomfield, English footballer and manager (born 1934)
- 1986 – Peter Pears, English tenor and educator (born 1910)
- 1987 – Tom Sestak, American football player (born 1936)
- 1988 – Milton Caniff, American cartoonist (born 1907)
- 1990 – Sarah Vaughan, American singer (born 1924)
- 1991 – Charles Goren, American bridge player and author (born 1901)
- 1991 – Graham Greene, English novelist, playwright, and critic (born 1904)
- 1993 – Pinky Lee, American television host (born 1907)
- 1994 – Frank Wells, American businessman (born 1932)
- 1995 – Alfred J. Billes, Canadian businessman, co-founded Canadian Tire (born 1902)
- 1996 – Ron Brown, American captain and politician, 30th United States Secretary of Commerce (born 1941)
- 1997 – John Ugelstad, Norwegian chemical engineer and inventor (born 1921)
- 1998 – Mary Cartwright, English mathematician and academic (born 1900)
- 1999 – Lionel Bart, English composer (born 1930)
- 1999 – Geoffrey Walsh, Canadian general (born 1909)
- 2000 – Terence McKenna, American botanist and philosopher (born 1946)
- 2000 – Dina Abramowicz, Librarian and YIVO and Yiddish language expert (born 1909)
- 2005 – François Gérin, Canadian lawyer and politician (born 1944)
- 2007 – Nina Wang, Chinese businesswoman (born 1937)
- 2008 – Hrvoje Ćustić, Croatian footballer (born 1983)
- 2012 – Mingote, Spanish cartoonist and journalist (born 1919)
- 2012 – Richard Descoings, French civil servant (born 1958)
- 2012 – Govind Narain, Indian politician, 8th Governor of Karnataka (born 1917)
- 2012 – Chief Jay Strongbow, American wrestler (born 1928)
- 2012 – José María Zárraga, Spanish footballer and manager (born 1930)
- 2013 – Mariví Bilbao, Spanish actress (born 1930)
- 2013 – Ruth Prawer Jhabvala, German-American author and screenwriter (born 1927)
- 2014 – Régine Deforges, French author, playwright, and director (born 1935)
- 2014 – Fred Kida, American illustrator (born 1920)
- 2014 – Prince Michael of Prussia (born 1940)
- 2014 – Jovan Pavlović, Serbian metropolitan (born 1936)
- 2014 – Arthur "Guitar Boogie" Smith, American guitarist, fiddler, and composer (born 1921)
- 2015 – Sarah Brady, American activist and author (born 1942)
- 2015 – Bob Burns, American drummer and songwriter (born 1950)
- 2015 – Shmuel Wosner, Austrian-Israeli rabbi and author (born 1913)
- 2016 – Cesare Maldini, Italian footballer and manager (born 1932)
- 2016 – Joe Medicine Crow, American anthropologist, historian, and author (born 1913)
- 2016 – Koji Wada, Japanese singer and songwriter (born 1974)
- 2017 – Kishori Amonkar, Indian classical vocalist (born 1931)
- 2021 – Stan Stephens, Canadian-American politician, 20th Governor of Montana (born 1929)
- 2022 – June Brown, English actress (born 1927)
- 2024 – Bob Lanigan, Australian rugby league player (born 1942)
- 2024 – Gaetano Pesce, Italian architect and designer (born 1939)
- 2025 – Theodore McCarrick, American former cardinal (born 1930)
- 2025 – Mick O'Dwyer, Irish Gaelic footballer and manager (born 1936)
- 2026 – Fred Curry, Lebanese-American professional wrestler (born 1941)

== Holidays and observances ==
- Christian feast day:
  - Agape, Chionia, and Irene
  - Burgundofara
  - Joseph the Hymnographer
  - Luigi Scrosoppi
  - Piotr Edward Dankowski
  - Richard of Chichester
  - April 3 (Eastern Orthodox liturgics)
