= List of English-speaking Quebecers =

Provincial flag of Quebec

Map and location of Quebec in Canada

This is a list of English-speaking Quebecers. To be included on this list, a person must satisfy the following criteria:

1. The person was resident in Quebec for some period of time.
2. English was the primary language the person used while in Quebec
3. The person meets the general notability requirements and has an article about them.
4. If they have left Quebec, their notability must be based at least in part on their activity or career in Quebec.

The start date for inclusion on this list is July 1, 1867, the date the current province of Quebec was created. The person must have been active in Quebec after that date.

This list is not based on ethnicity, but on language spoken.

== A ==
- Douglas Abbott (1899–1987), politician and justice of the Supreme Court of Canada
- John Abbott (1821–1893), Prime Minister of Canada
- Maude Abbott (1869–1940), physician and scientist
- Elie Abel (1920–2004), journalist and author
- Mark Abley (born 1955), poet, journalist and author
- Marianne Ackerman (born 1952), novelist, playwright and journalist
- Frank Dawson Adams (1859–1942), geologist
- Ben Addelman (born 1977), film director
- H. Montagu Allan (1860–1951), businessman and philanthropist
- Hugh Allan (1810–1882) shipping magnate, financier and capitalist
- Moyra Allen (1921–1996), professor of nursing, McGill University
- Melissa Altro (born 1982), actress, voice actress
- Jasey-Jay Anderson (born 1975), snowboarder and Olympic gold medalist
- Joel Anthony (born 1982), basketball player
- Alex Anthopoulos (born 1977), baseball general manager
- Michael Applebaum (born 1963), interim and first Anglophone mayor of Montreal in over a century
- David Morrison Armstrong (1805–1873), merchant, insurance agent and Legislative Councillor
- Melissa Auf der Maur (born 1972), vocalist and musician
- Nick Auf der Maur (1942–1998), journalist and politician
- Thomas Cushing Aylwin (1806–1871), lawyer, politician, judge

== B ==
- Jay Baruchel (born 1982), actor
- Joe Beef (1835–1889), tavern owner
- Tyrone Benskin (born 1958), actor and politician
- Conrad Black (born 1944), entrepreneur
- Henry Black (1798–1873) lawyer, politician, and judge
- Mike Bossy (1957–2022), National Hockey League player
- Scotty Bowman, National Hockey League coach and executive
- Bowser and Blue, musical comedy and satire duo
- Charles Bronfman (born 1931), businessman and philanthropist
- Edgar Bronfman, Sr. (1929–2013), businessman and philanthropist
- Samuel Bronfman (1889–1971), businessman and philanthropist
- Wally Buono (born 1950), Canadian Football League player and coach
- Pat Burns (1952–2010), National Hockey League coach

== C ==
- Dayana Cadeau (born 1966), professional bodybuilder
- Leonard Cohen (1934–2016), poet, songwriter
- Corey Crawford (born 1984), hockey player
- Peter Cullen (1941-2026), voice actor

== D ==
- Sir Mortimer B. Davis (1866–1928), philanthropist
- Norman Dawe (1898–1948), Montreal area sports executive
- Charles Dewey Day (1806–1884), lawyer, politician, judge and chancellor of McGill University
- Ivan Doroschuk (born 1957), musician

== E ==
- Edith Maude Eaton (1865–1914), author
- Winnifred Eaton (1875–1954), author

== F ==
- Don Ferguson (born 1946), actor, scriptwriter, comedian
- Greg Fergus (born 1969), former Speaker of the House of Commons of Canada

== G ==
- Mavis Gallant (1922–2014), writer
- Mitch Garber (born 1964), businessman, philanthropist
- W. R. Granger (1873–1925), sports administrator, businessman, and Canadian Amateur Hockey Association president
- Frank Greenleaf (1877–1953), sports administrator, businessman, and Canadian Amateur Hockey Association president

== H ==
- Rawi Hage (born 1964), journalist
- Edward Hale (1800–1875), businessman, politician, chancellor of Bishop's University
- Corey Hart (born 1962), musician
- Doug Harvey (1924–1989), National Hockey League player
- Prudence Heward (1896–1947), painter

== J ==
- Emmett Johns (1928–2018), priest, founder of Dans la Rue
- Oliver Jones (born 1934), jazz pianist

== K ==
- Nicholas Kasirer, Justice of the Supreme Court of Canada
- Jonah Keri (born 1974), journalist, author
- Andy Kim (born 1946), singer
- Naomi Klein (born 1970), journalist, author

== L ==
- Jon Lajoie (born 1980), comedian
- Dane Lanken (born 1945), journalist
- Irving Layton (1912–2006), poet
- Jack Layton (1950–2011), politician
- Jaclyn Linetsky (1986–2003), actress
- William Edmond Logan (1798–1875), geologist
- Kevin Lowe (born 1959), National Hockey League player
- John Lynch-Staunton (1930–2012), businessman, Senator

== M ==
- Norm Macdonald (1959-2021), comedian
- Anna McGarrigle (born 1944), singer-songwriter
- Kate McGarrigle (1946–2010), singer-songwriter
- Don McGowan (1938–2023), CFCF television personality
- Stuart McLean (1948–2017), journalist, broadcaster, storyteller, author
- Gerry McNeil (1926–2004), National Hockey League player
- Torrey Mitchell (born 1985), National Hockey League player
- Hartland Molson (1907–2002), brewer, sportsman, senator
- Dickie Moore (1931–2015), National Hockey League player
- Terry Mosher (born 1942), caricaturist
- Thomas Mulcair (born 1954), politician
- Brian Mulroney (1939–2024), Prime Minister of Canada

== N ==
- Percy Erskine Nobbs (1875–1964), architect

== P ==
- Wilder Penfield (1891–1976), neurosurgeon, medical scientist
- Louise Penny (born 1958), novelist
- Oscar Peterson (1925–2007), jazz pianist
- Conrad Poirier (1912–1968), photojournalist
- Juliette Powell (1970-2025), journalist, television personality

== R ==
- Mordecai Richler (1931–2001), author
- Sam Roberts (born 1974), singer
- Witold Rybczynski (born 1943), architect, professor and author

== S ==
- Anne Savage (1896–1971), painter
- F. R. Scott (1899–1985), lawyer and author
- William Shatner (born 1931), actor
- Denis Stairs (1889–1980), chairman, Montreal Engineering Co.
- Victor Suthren (born 1942), writer
- Micheal Sanderson (born 1952)

== T ==
- Donald Tarlton, record producer, promoter

== W ==
- Rufus Wainwright (born 1973), singer-songwriter
- Kathleen Weil (born 1954), politician
- Bill Wennington (born 1963), Quebec Basketball Hall of Fame member
- Lucille Wheeler (born 1935), alpine ski champion
