= List of Anglo-Quebecer musicians =

The following list refers only to native Anglo-Quebecers. For Quebec musicians who sing in French, Québécois artists, and native Francophone Quebecers who sing in English, please see Music of Quebec.

The following is a list of Anglo-Quebecer musicians and groups.

== Singers ==
- Melissa Auf der Maur
- Leonard Cohen
- Corey Hart
- Sass Jordan
- Andy Kim
- Patrick Watson

== Popular music groups ==
- The Agonist
- Arcade Fire
- Bowser & Blue
- Bran Van 3000
- Busty and the Bass
- The Dears
- Deja Voodoo
- Godspeed You! Black Emperor
- The Gruesomes
- Half Moon Run
- Mashmakhan
- Kate & Anna McGarrigle
- Me Mom & Morgentaler
- Men I Trust
- Men Without Hats
- Michael Laucke & Fiesta Flamenco
- The Nils
- Sam Roberts
- The Stills
- Third Place
- The Unicorns
- Wolf Parade

== Jazz musicians ==
- Sayyd Abdul Al-Khabyyr
- Charlie Biddle
- Oliver Jones
- Ranee Lee
- Oscar Peterson
- Michelle Sweeney
- Karen Young

== See also ==
- Montreal International Jazz Festival
- Anglo-Quebecer
- List of Quebecers
- List of English-speaking Quebecers
- Music of Quebec
