= English-speaking Quebecers =

Sociolinguistic group

English-speaking Quebecer
Total population
- Mother tongue: 661,535 (8.5%) Home language: 767,770 (9.6%) Official Lang. Minority: 1,058,250 (13.5%)

Regions with significant populations
- Montreal (West Island), Laval, Montérégie, Outaouais, Eastern townships (historically)

Languages
- Quebec English, Quebec French

Religion
- Roman Catholic (43%), Protestant (21%), Christian Orthodox (9%), Jewish (7%), Muslim (5%)

Related ethnic groups
- English Canadian, Irish Canadian, Scottish Canadian, French Canadian, Jewish Canadian, Italian Canadian, Greek Canadian, Chinese Canadian, Indo Canadian, First Nations People

English-speaking Quebecers, also known as Anglo-Quebecers, English Quebecers, or Anglophone Quebecers (all alternately spelt Quebeckers; in French Anglo-Québécois, Québécois Anglophone) or simply Anglos in a Quebec context, are Québécois people who speak English as their primary language. According to the 2011 Canadian census, 599,225 people (around 7.7% of the population) in Quebec declare English as a mother tongue. When asked, 834,950 people (about 10.7% of the population) reported using English the most at home.

The origins of English-speaking Quebecers include immigration from both English-speaking and non English-speaking countries, migration from other Canadian provinces, and strong English language education programs in Quebecois schools. This makes estimating the population of those who identify as English-speaking Quebecers difficult.

== Population ==
Number of English-Speaking Quebecers (2001)
Criteria		Quebec	Montreal
Mother tongue
Mother tongue	Official	591,379 (8.3%)	401,183 (10.5%)
Mother tongue	Eng only	557,040	379,570
Mother tongue	Eng + Fr	50,060	
Mother tongue	Eng + Other	15,040	
Mother tongue	Total	622,140	424,355
Home language
Home language	Official	746,895 (10.5%)	552,610 (19.7%)
Home language	Eng only	480,400	376,720
Home language	Mostly	220,850	175,990
Home language	Equally	95,970	74,350
Home language	Regularly	393,575	202,465
Home language	Total	1,190,435	886,050
First official language
First official language	Off lang minority	918,955 (12.9%)	699,203 (25%)
First official language	Eng only	828,730	619,790
First official language	Eng + Fr	180,450	158,885
First official language	Total	1,009,180	778,645
Knowledge of English		3,234,740	2,047,520
Total Population		7,125,580	2,796,390

English-language population in Quebec
Year	Mother tongue	Home language	1st official language
1951	558,256 (13.8%)	No data	No data
1961	697,402 (13.3%)	No data	No data
1971	788,830 (13.1%)	887,875 (14.7%)	992,368 (16.5%)
1981	693,600 (10.9%)	806,785 (12.7%)	889,612 (14.0%)
1991	626,200 (9.2%)	761,810 (11.2%)	904,301 (13.3%)
1996	631,038 (9.0%)	779,383 (11.1%)	925,833 (13.1%)
2001	591,365 (8.3%)	746,895 (10.5%)	918,956 (12.9%)
2006	607,165 (8.2%)	803,170 (10.8%)	994,723 (13.4%)
2011	599,230 (7.6%)	861,770 (11.0%)	1,058,250 (13.5%)

Interprovincial migration between Quebec and other provinces by Mother Tongue
Year	French	English	Other
1971–1976	−4,100	−52,200	−5,700
1976–1981	−18,000	−106,300	−17,400
1981–1986	−12,900	−41,600	−8,700
1986–1991	5,200	−22,200	−8,600
1991–1996	1,200	−24,500	−14,100
1996–2001	−8,900	−29,200	−19,100
2001–2006	5,000	−8,000	−8,700
2006–2011	−3,700	−17,200	−1000
Total	−36,200	−301,200	−82,300

Statistics Canada uses census data to keep track of minority language communities in Canada. It has recorded mother tongue (the first language learned as a child and still spoken) since 1921, home language (language spoken at home) since 1971, and first official language learned (English or French) since 1991. In addition, conversational knowledge of English and French is documented.

A considerable number of census respondents in each category cite equal proficiency, knowledge, and use of different languages. In this case, census respondents are divided evenly among the language groups involved.

As allophone immigrants (mother tongue other than English or French) generally arrive with knowledge of either English or French and eventually integrate into these two linguistic groups, first official language learned is used to determine the Official Language minority population. It is used by the federal government and Quebec anglophone community organizations to determine the demand for minority language services. Specifically, it classifies members of immigrant groups who learn English before French as English-speaking. Half of the people equally proficient since childhood in both English and French are placed into each linguistic community.

The English-speaking population has shown an accelerated decline in population between 1971 and 2001. During this interval, the number of mother tongue anglophones decreased from 788,830 to 591,365, representing a drop in its share of the Quebec population from 13.1% to 8.3%. This is attributed primarily to an exodus of anglophones to other provinces and raised questions about the sustainability of the community.

Immigration from other countries and integration of allophones helped to partially alleviate the impact of this trend. In 2001, one in three immigrants to Quebec was English-speaking and settled in Montreal. This made the decrease in home-language anglophones less pronounced, particularly in the Montreal area. This situation is rapidly changing as the vast majority of immigrants now adopt French as their first language: three quarters of linguistic transfers of allophones arriving between 2001 and 2006 allophones arriving have been towards French instead of English.

The 2006 census showed an increase of the Anglophone population in Quebec. The rise of 16,000 people (from 591,000 in 2001 to 607,000 in 2006) represents a growth rate of +2.7%, which is higher than that for the Francophone population (+2.0%) for the same period. This increase is attributed to a much reduced net outmigration of Anglophones, with some 34,000 departures vs 26,000 arrivals (primarily from Ontario).

Emigration to other Canadian provinces was perceived as the biggest challenge facing the continued presence of English-language communities in Quebec, particularly outside Montreal, during the 1976 to 2001 period. English-speakers accounted for half the out-migrants from Quebec as they are extremely mobile compared to their francophone neighbours because they share a language and cultural identity with most other Canadians and North Americans. In a survey on the matter, English-speaking Quebecers cited limited economic prospects and politics (Quebec's language policies and the Quebec independence) as primary reasons for leaving. These political factors are also cited as having led to fewer Canadians from other provinces settling in Quebec.

Anglophones are also less likely to migrate within the province than Francophones and Allophones. This is due to a strong sense of belonging among those in the Montreal area, the relative lack of English-language services and institutions outside Montreal, and a weak sense of identification with Quebec.

Despite a lull in this outflux during an economic boom and break from separatist governments in 2003, this outmigration had returned to established levels by 2006 and is projected to continue at these rates over the next five years. At the time, this forecast made researcher Jack Jedwab predict a continued long term decline of the community.

== Locations ==
=== Montreal ===
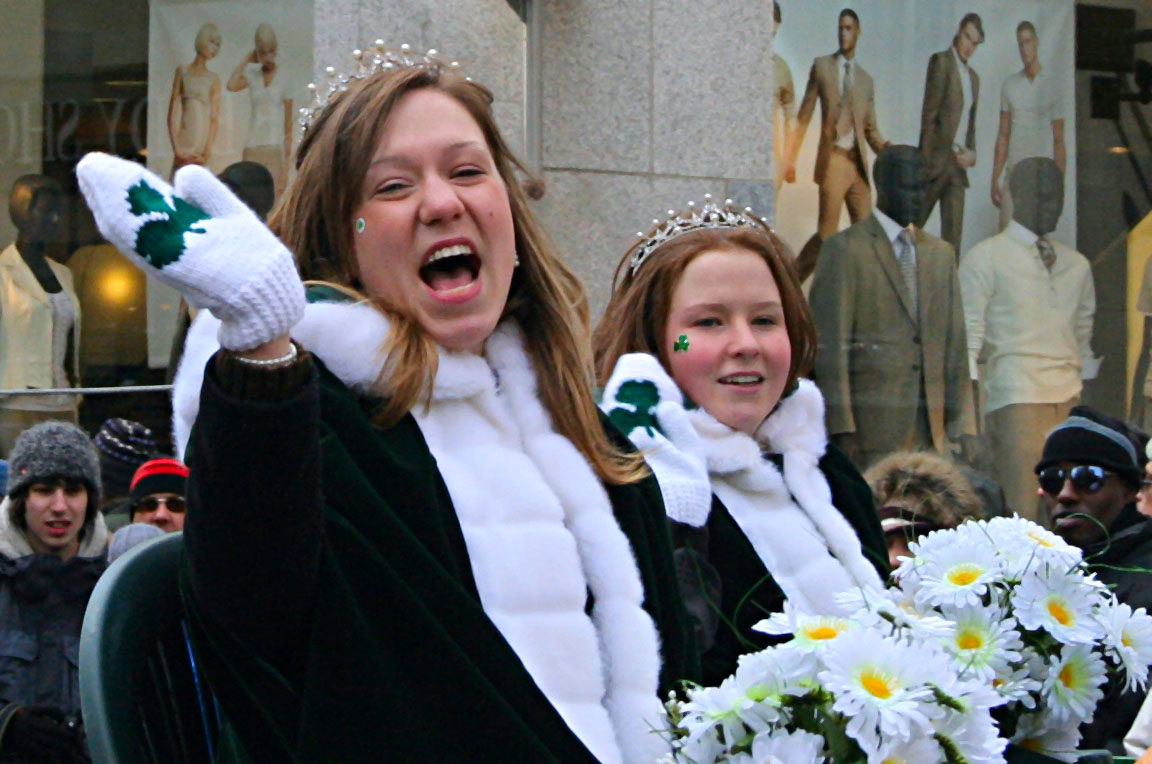
Saint Patrick's Day Parade in Montreal

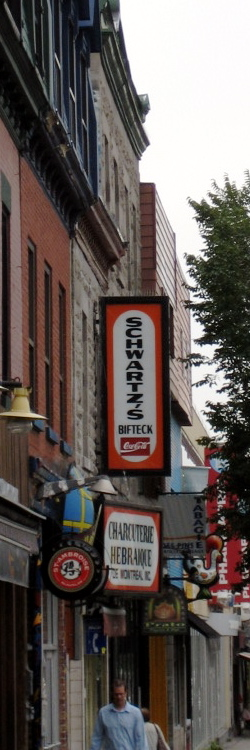
Schwartz's Hebrew Delicatessen on The Main

Most of Quebec's English-speaking population resides in the Montreal region on the Island of Montreal. The population is concentrated in the West Island and in the western half of Montreal's urban core, where there is a large network of English-language educational, social, cultural, economic, and medical institutions. However, there are smaller English-speaking communities in the east end as well, notably Saint-Leonard and Rivière-des-Prairies.

The earliest English-speaking people arrived in Montreal at the beginning of the British regime in the second half of the 18th century. By 1831 the majority of the population were of British origin. American merchants, United Empire Loyalists and Anglo-Scot Protestants founded Quebec's public and private English-language institutions and would represent Quebec's elite merchant and financial classes up until the 1960s; the heritage of this era remains in neighbourhoods such as Westmount and the Golden Square Mile.

Irish Quebecers established their schools, churches and hospitals in the mid-19th century in traditionally working-class neighbourhoods such as Point St. Charles and Griffintown. Separate English-language confessional (Protestant and Catholic) school systems emerged, in the religious-based Montreal Catholic School Commission and Protestant School Board of Greater Montreal, and would be guaranteed in the British North America Act 1867 thanks to D'Arcy McGee, a prominent Irish Montrealer. Prior 2000, these school systems were merged into linguistic English-language boards.

An English-speaking Black Canadian community grew in the 1860s with the coming of the railway industry centred in Montreal, settling in Little Burgundy and Saint-Henri. The first school built by the new Protestant Board of School Commissioners of Montreal was the Royal Arthur School which opened in 1870.

The early 1900s brought waves of settlers from all over Europe. Jews from Poland, Romania and Russia established a large Jewish community, and integrated into the English-speaking "Protestant" schools and businesses. Italian immigrants would adopt the Catholic institutions of either the Irish or francophone community. These and many other immigrant communities would initially settle along Saint Lawrence Boulevard (nicknamed "The Main"), before moving on to more prosperous suburbs such as Côte-Saint-Luc and Saint-Léonard.

Ethnic Origins of the metropolitan region of Montreal Anglophones
Ethnicity	Population	Percent
Total	734,928	100%
Italian	112,490	15.3%
English	102,998	14.0%
Irish	78,175	10.6%
Scottish	64,770	8.8%
French	63,218	8.6%
Jewish	61,933	8.4%

In the 1950s, more immigration from Europe again changed the face of Montreal. Immigrants flocked to Montreal from all across Europe, bolstering the numbers of established cultural communities, with a Greek community planting strong roots in the English-speaking community.

Immigrants of today come from all over the world (some have argued that they are largely more secular than members of the established English-speaking communities). Also, a larger proportion are French-speaking than before. However, immigrants from English-speaking countries such as Britain, the United States, and Jamaica usually come with a knowledge of English; Asians account for the fastest growing segment of the population, with over 26,000 Asians coming to Quebec between 1996 and 2001 and having English as their first official language spoken in 2001; as a result, over a quarter of anglophones now come from visible minority groups. Some First Nation peoples such as the Mohawk, the Cree, and Inuit also use English in their day-to-day lives. These groups blend in easily in a community that defines itself increasingly as multicultural and bilingual. Its large diversity, mobility and access to mainstream North American society means that most anglophones in Quebec will identify themselves as Canadian or by their cultural group, and identify as "anglophone" only in the context of Quebec's French-speaking majority.

=== Montérégie and Estrie ===
In the late 18th century and the early 19th century, the Eastern Townships and the Chateauguay Valley were pioneered by English-speaking settlers who moved north from the United States; the first were Loyalists (Tories in the U.S.) wishing to remain British subjects after The American Revolution. Very few of these Loyalists were allowed to stay in the Eastern Townships and were in fact forced by the British to move from the lands that they were squatting on because the British desired to keep the Eastern Townships as an unpopulated buffer zone between the Canadians and the Americans. By the end of the 1790s, American homesteaders were allowed to come northward to settle lands across the border.

Today, the southwestern portion of the Montérégie, notably the Chateauguay Valley and Vaudreuil-Soulanges, are home to a significant anglophone presence. The town of Hudson, and the cities of Saint-Lazare and Pincourt, have an anglophone majority and pluralities respectively.

=== Laval ===
In Laval, the neighbourhoods of Chomedey and Sainte-Dorothée have noticeable English-speaking communities, particularly of Italian and Greek descent.

=== Elsewhere in Quebec ===
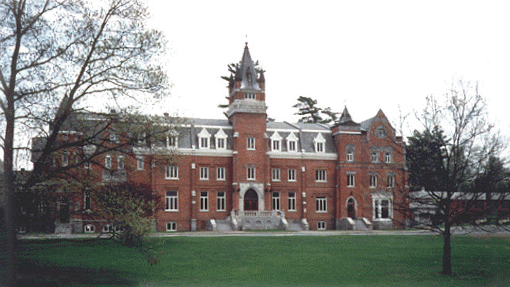
McGreer Building, Bishop's University, Lennoxville, Eastern Townships

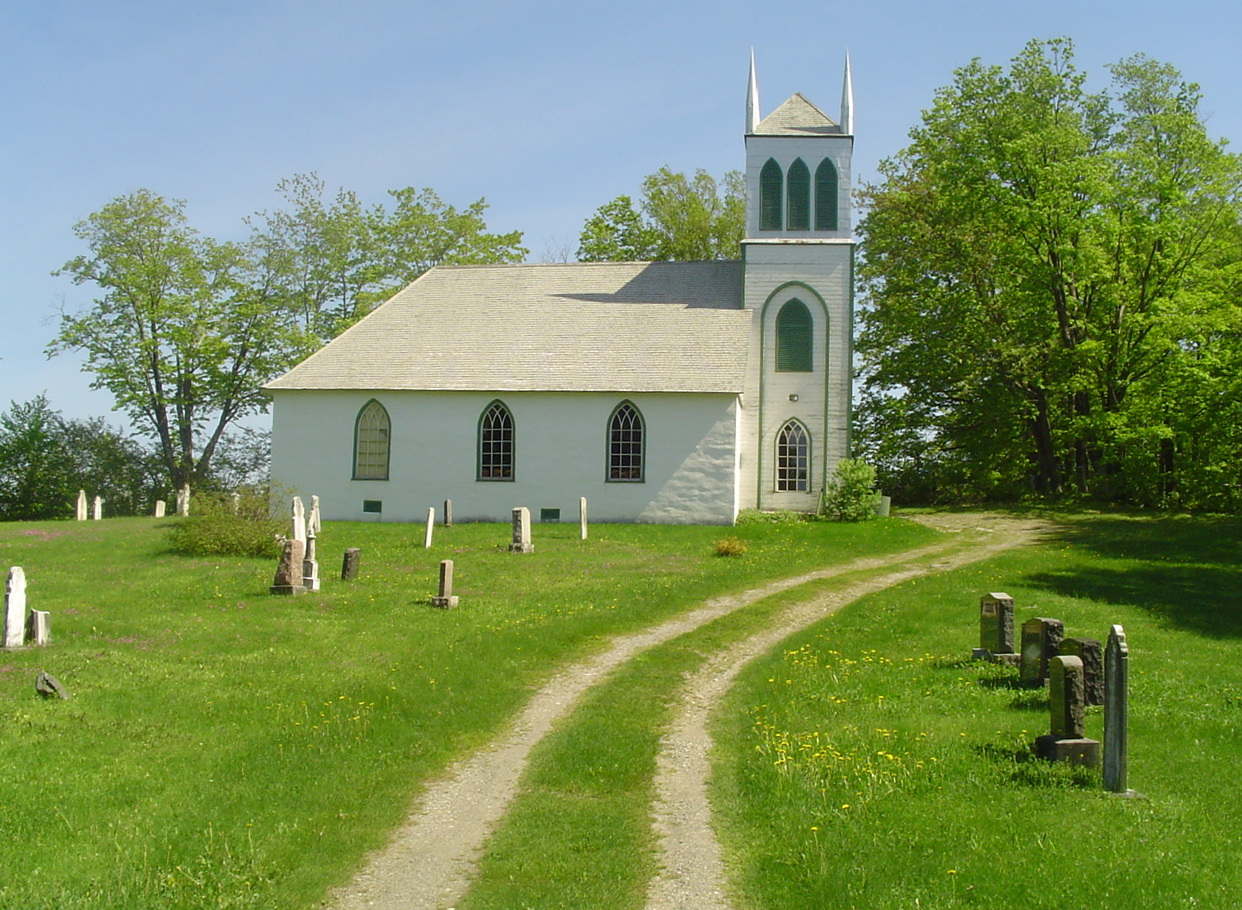
Christ Church of Springbrook Anglican Church in Frampton, Quebec

Many American and Anglo-Scottish merchants settled in Quebec City in the nineteenth century; however, the majority of anglophones were working-class Irish immigrants. In the 1860s, the proportion of English-speakers reached a historic high of 40%. The population gradually dwindled as Montreal replaced Quebec City as a centre of commerce and industry. English-speakers now represent 1.9% of the total population in the Quebec metropolitan area. The Morrin Centre is a cultural hub for Quebec City's English-speaking community, linked together by media institutions such as the Quebec Chronicle-Telegraph, CBC Radio One (CBVE-FM) in Quebec City, and the La Maison Anglaise bookstore

All English-speaking communities outside the Montreal metropolitan area have been in decline for over a century. However, communities near Montreal, the border with Ontario, and the border with the United States are still large enough to constitute a sizeable yet shrinking minority in these regions.

Immigrants from England, Scotland, and Ireland would further settle these regions in the mid 19th century, and pioneer the Outaouais region (Gatineau and Pontiac region) and many Laurentian communities. By the end of the nineteenth century, many grew into thriving small cities: Shawville, Aylmer, Hull, Lachute, Huntingdon, St. Johns (now Saint-Jean-sur-Richelieu), Granby, Saint-Hyacinthe, Victoriaville, Drummondville, Magog, Sherbrooke, Sawyerville. Migration to larger cities in Canada (including Montreal) has since reduced the English-speaking population in these regions, but sizeable English-speaking communities remain in Sherbrooke (Lennoxville), North Hatley, Richmond, Ayer's Cliff, Brome Lake (Knowlton), and Sutton. The English-speaking population is anchored by such institutions as Bishop's University in Sherbrooke and the Eastern Townships School Board.

There has been English-speaking settlement or immigration to some degree in almost all areas of Quebec at one time or another. What remains today in many regions is only symbolic as anglophones have moved away, or assimilated into the French-speaking community (usually Catholics such as the Irish). English-speaking communities in the Gaspé Peninsula and the Lower North Shore remain, as well as a small community in the Magdalen Islands.

== Media ==
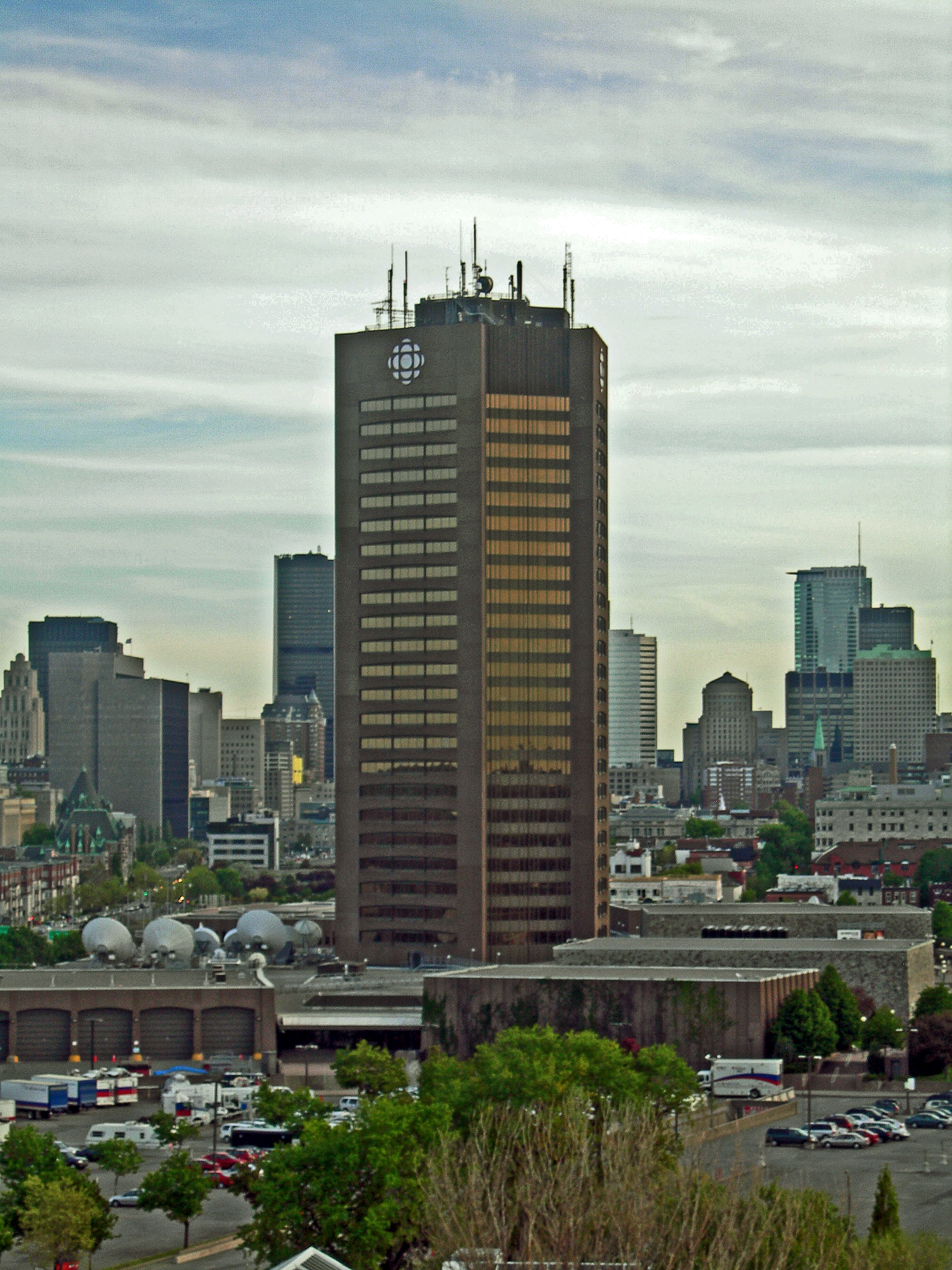
CBC House (Radio-Canada building) in Montreal

English-language media tends to come from outside the province. Most local English-language media are based in the Montreal area.

=== Television ===
The province's English-language television stations are CBMT (CBC), CFCF (CTV), CKMI (Global) and CJNT (Citytv), all in Montreal. These stations are available on cable throughout the province and can also be received for free with the use of home TV antennas in cities located near television transmission towers.

Anglophones in the Outaouais region are served by English stations from Ottawa. Southern Quebec is also served by American network affiliates from Vermont and New York's North Country who actually depend on the Montreal market for most of their revenue. The Burlington, VT stations are WCAX (CBS), WVNY (ABC), WFFF-TV (Fox), and Vermont Public Television (PBS). The Plattsburgh, NY stations are WPTZ (NBC) and WCFE (PBS). These stations are carried on Montreal-area cable networks, along with other English and French-language cable stations. (See Multichannel television in Canada.) Western Montreal carries more English-language programming to better serve the large English-speaking market.

=== Radio ===
English-language radio stations in Montreal include AM stations CKGM (sports), CJAD (news/talk) and FM outlets CBME (CBC Radio One), CKUT (campus radio from McGill University), CFQR (The Beat 92.5, adult contemporary), CJFM (Virgin Radio 96, hot AC), CBM (CBC Radio 2) and CHOM (mainstream rock). The Montreal off-island suburbs of Hudson/Saint-Lazare has English-language FM outlet CHSV (Lite 106.7, soft adult contemporary). CKON-FM, owned by and serving the Mohawk Nation of Akwesasne, broadcasts in English and Kanien'keha. Listeners in Sherbrooke, Lennoxville and the Eastern Townships are served by CBC Radio One and CBC Radio 2 and the community radio station CJMQ. CBC Radio One is also available in many other Quebec communities. Parts of the province also receive English-language signals from Ontario, New Brunswick, New York or New England, notably VPR and PBS. However, no community in the province besides Montreal and Hudson/Saint Lazare has an English commercial station.

=== Newspapers and periodicals ===
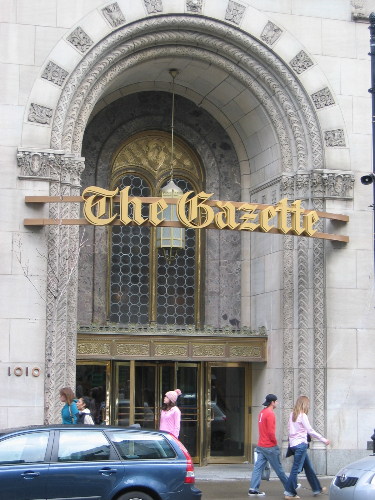
Offices of The Gazette on Saint Catherine Street in Montreal

Quebec has two English-language daily newspapers: the large Montreal Gazette, and the small Sherbrooke Record, a local newspaper for the Eastern Townships. Many smaller communities in Quebec also have English-language weekly papers, including The Equity in Shawville, The Pontiac Journal, a bilingual and bimonthly paper, the Stanstead Journal in Stanstead, The First Informer in the Magdalen Islands, The Gleaner in Huntingdon, the Quebec Chronicle-Telegraph in Quebec City, SPEC in the Gaspé region, the West Quebec Post in Buckingham, the Aylmer Bulletin in Aylmer, the Townships Sun in Lennoxville, the Suburban, Montreal Island's Largest English Weekly, the Chronicle and the West End Times in the West Island of Montreal, the Westmount Independent in Westmount, and The LowDown to Hull and Back News in La Pêche. From the 1990s until 2012, Montreal also had two English alternative weeklies, Hour and Mirror.

Maisonneuve is a culturally literate bimonthly general-interest English-language magazine published in Montreal.

== Politics ==
From the invasion of New France in the 1760s and the formation of Canada in 1867 until the Quiet Revolution of the 1960s, the economy of Quebec and its high-ranking positions were controlled by the English speaking minority in Quebec, who were always a small minority comprising less than 10% throughout Quebec's post–Royal French Canadian history and who used to be mostly unilingual English speakers, despite the Francophone Québécois' comprising more than 80% of the province's population.

The politics of language has always played against issues of Quebec nationalism and Quebec separatism. English-speaking Quebeckers maintain a strong Canadian identity, with about 99% opposing Quebec sovereignty in 1980 and 1995 referendums. Having no distinct political representation in Quebec, they tend to vote for the federalist Liberal Party of Canada federally and for the Quebec Liberal Party at the provincial level. In 2001, English-speaking Quebeckers viewed provincial language legislation as the principal challenge facing their community and more generally look to the federal government to protect their individual and collective rights from provincial government limits on access to English education, health care, government services, and visibility on public signs.

The Canadian constitution protects the language rights of English-speaking communities and individuals in Quebec; however, since 1867, the Quebec provincial government has had full jurisdiction over schools, with only section 93 of the British North America Act 1867 (the Constitution Act, 1867) guaranteeing Protestant confessional boards the right to administer most English schools. Section 133 still allows French and English to be used in the Parliament of Canada and the Legislature of Quebec and makes both languages mandatory for the laws, records, and journals of those houses. It also gives any person the right to plead in either English or French in any of the Courts of Quebec. In 1982, Section 23 of the Constitution Act, 1982 guaranteed the right of Canadian citizens educated in English in Canada to attend English schools. This paved the way for the Constitutional Amendment, 1999 (Québec) which was passed unanimously by the federal Parliament and the National Assembly of Quebec that transformed Protestant confessional school boards into English linguistic school boards. The federal government also maintains the Official Languages Act of 1988 that ensures equality between English and French in the federal civil service and ensures that official minority language groups in Canada receive service in their language where numbers warrant and that supports the development of communities of speakers of official languages when they constitute a minority in a province or territory.

Provincial legislation has also delimited the language rights of English-speaking Quebeckers and the role of their institutions since the Quiet Revolution as French-speaking Québécois sought to improve their economic prospects, assimilate immigrants into their community to maintain their population, and establish French as a language of business. Bill 63, introduced by the Union nationale government in 1969, required that English schools provide all students with a working knowledge of French. In 1974, the Liberal government of Robert Bourassa passed Bill 22 and restricted access to English schools to children who could pass a language test. In 1977, the separatist Parti Québécois passed the more intensive Charter of the French Language (Bill 101). This law made French the sole language of the civil service and of business in private workplaces with over 50 employees and established the right of all Quebeckers to work solely in French, now the sole official language of the province; it also favoured a demographic shift towards more francophones in Quebec by restricting access to English-language schools to children whose parents had attended Quebec English grade schools or high schools. The Charter is generally seen as emancipatory and a protector of culture and is immensely popular among Quebeckers.

Other Charter provisions, though, deeply alienated English-speaking Quebeckers. The Charter cut off access to English schools to all but children who had parents who had received their education in English in Quebec. The Charter also eliminated the Constitutional guarantee to English legal proceedings and eliminated English translations of Quebec laws. It banned all languages other than French on all public signs, both inside and outside. (The regulations for signs would be modified in 1988 and 1993.) The law has therefore polarized Quebec along linguistic lines to this day. Legal challenges by English-speaking Quebeckers using provisions of the Canadian constitution and international law overturned some of these provisions, forcing subsequent Quebec governments to blunt these Charter provisions many times.

The Charter coupled with the looming 1980 Referendum on Sovereignty triggered an exodus of English-speaking Quebeckers between 1976 and 1980, exacerbating the already existing demographic decline. Head offices that employed anglophones moved mostly to Toronto, taking their employees with them. Structural unemployment in the private sector with the mass hiring of francophones in an expanding civil service limited the economic opportunities of especially young non-bilingual anglophones in Quebec leading them to search for work elsewhere. Young highly educated anglophones, despite high rates of bilingualism and increased contact and openness to francophones, cite limited economic prospects caused by linguistic discrimination and an unsatisfactory political climate as the major factors in their departure. By 2001, 50% of mother-tongue anglophones had left the province.

Faced with increasing marginalization from the political process in Quebec, English-speaking community groups across the province banded together to form Alliance Quebec, a provincial lobby group that would advocate for English-language education, health, and social services. It was supported by the federal Commissioner of Official Languages and members worked with provincial administrations to maintain and increase access to English government services across the province.

Sign laws governing language are a particular irritant to English-speaking Quebeckers. When the original Charter provision requiring French only on commercial signs and in trade names was struck down by the Supreme Court in 1988, the Liberal government of Robert Bourassa passed Bill 178 that made French the only language that could be used on outdoor commercial signs. This required invoking the notwithstanding clause in the Canadian Constitution, which overrode the Supreme Court decision. Discontent with the Liberals led anglophones in Western Montreal to form the Equality Party in protest, which surprised many by electing 4 candidates in the 1989 provincial election. As the sign law would have to be renewed in 1993, the Liberal government passed a law that mandated French on signs. As recommended by the Supreme Court, this law allowed other languages on the sign, as long as French was predominant. Although this law stands up to Supreme Court challenges, many anglophones refer to the inspectorate that enforces the law as "tongue troopers" and "language cops".

In addition to the rights guaranteed by the constitution of Canada, the various regulations outside the Charter recognise other linguistic rights of Quebec anglophones. Quebeckers have the right to receive services in English from all public health care and social service institutions in Quebec. The charter also permits bilingual status to cities, but only those with a majority of English mother-tongue residents; other cities are not required to provide services in English but usually do if a significant minority of the population is English-speaking. Ninety-three municipalities offer bilingual services in Quebec.

In 2002, Quebec's French Language Charter was amended with Bill 104, which aims to prevent education received in fully private English schools or through temporary certificates from producing constitutional education rights. Several court cases are still pending.

After the 2022 Quebec general election, political leaders and commentators of the province issued growing concerns about the political weight of the English speaking Quebeckers in Quebec's democracy. The Quebec Liberal Party did indeed win the second place in parliament having 21 seats while having 14.37% of the popular vote, behind Québec Solidaire and the Parti Québécois, respectively in third and fourth place with 11 and 3 seats. It is generally understood that this happened because of the concentration of the Liberal vote in the Centre and Western part of Montreal, where English speakers are often a majority.

== Education ==
In 2001, Quebec had 340 primary and secondary English-language schools administered by nine English-language school boards. As in French-language schools, elementary education goes from Kindergarten to Elementary 6 (K-6), while high school goes from Secondary 1 to 5 (grades 7-11). The curriculum is strictly controlled by the Ministère de l'Éducation, Quebec's provincial education ministry, and is generally identical to that offered in the French-language public school system.

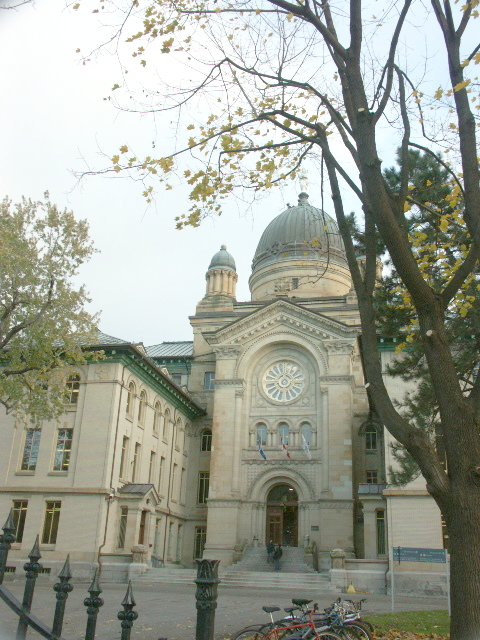
Dawson College, Montreal

The exception is language education. French is taught as a second language in English schools from Grade 1 onwards, and English is symmetrically taught as a second language in French schools from grade 1 onwards. English schools in the Montreal area were pioneers in French immersion and bilingual education starting in the late 1960s. As a result, they offer a range of established bilingual and short- and long-immersion programs. Programs offering both French and English curricula as a first language have recently been approved by the Minister of Education and are increasingly popular. English immersion programs are not common in French-language public schools.

Some English-speaking Quebecers also opt to send their children to French-language schools. As a result, programs to integrate English-speaking children into a French-speaking milieu (particularly in English-speaking areas on the West Island) are increasingly popular in French school boards, and have used in French-language private school for years.

In an addition to the public system, many private schools provide instruction in English, including schools serving religious and cultural communities. Quebec subsidizes a large portion of the tuition on the condition that they teach the provincial curriculum; almost all private schools accept these conditions and the accompanying subsidy.

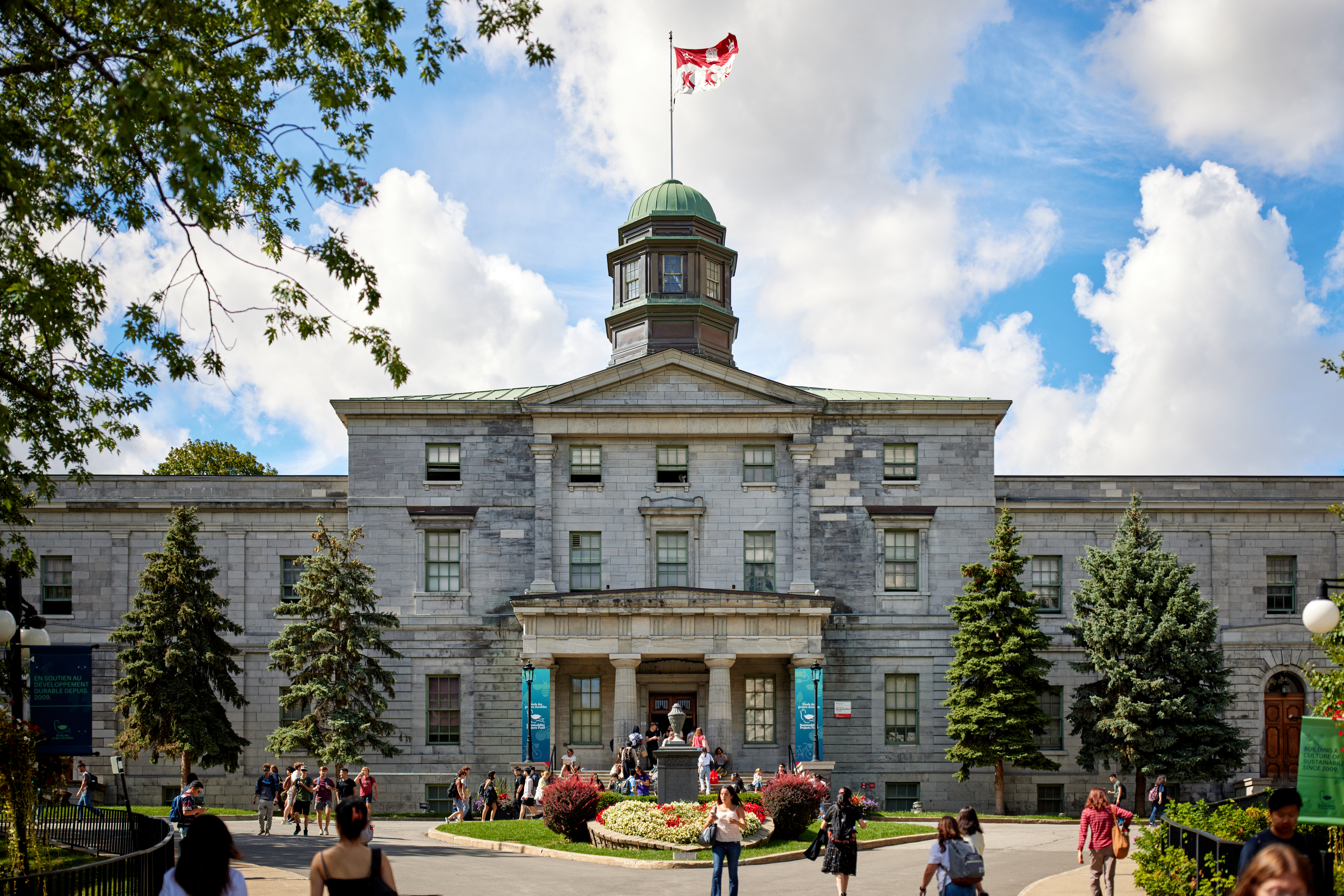
McGill University, Montreal

Access to English-language public and semi-private education is restricted by provincial law to children who have at least one parent educated in English in Canada. Temporary residents of Quebec and English-speaking immigrants whose children have special learning needs may apply to the Ministère de l'Éducation for permission to enter these schools. (see Charter of the French Language). Access to private schools is open to anyone who can afford the tuition.

Colleges provide 3-year career certification programs or 2-year pre-University curricula following Grade 11 (Secondary 5) high school. Most are public colleges and have very low tuition fees; a few are subsidized private institutions. Core courses in English literature, humanities, and French represent about 25% of the curriculum. There are eight English-language Colleges, open to all Quebec residents.

English is also the language of instruction at three Quebec universities (McGill University, Concordia University and Bishop's University) that offer 3-year undergraduate programs for Quebec students graduating from college. They also offer standard 4-year programs to students from all over Canada, North America, and the world. For Quebec residents, 85% of tuition is subsidized by the provincial government. Canadian students pay differential tuition fees based on the Canadian average. Foreign students pay the full cost of their tuition, although Quebec has signed reciprocal agreements with some jurisdictions such as France, Belgium, Bavaria, and Catalonia allowing students to pay local Quebec tuition rates. McGill and Concordia offer some instruction in French, and exams and assignments may be done in French at all universities, as long as the goal of the course is not to learn or improve the mastery of a language.

== Health care ==
Montreal has several English-language hospitals that offer multilingual services, including service in French:

- McGill University Health Centre
  - Montreal General Hospital
  - Royal Victoria Hospital
  - Montreal Children's Hospital
  - Montreal Neurological Institute
  - Montreal Chest Institute
  - Lachine Hospital
  - Allan Memorial Institute
- Douglas Mental Health University Institute (Montreal)
- Lakeshore General Hospital (Pointe-Claire)
- Jewish General Hospital (Montreal)
- Saint Mary's Hospital (Montreal)
- Queen Elizabeth Health Centre, formerly the Queen Elizabeth hospital

Outside Montreal, some hospitals also provide services in English.

- Brome-Missisquoi-Perkins Hospital (Eastern Townships)
- Pontiac Community Hospital (Shawville)
- Jeffery Hale Hospital (Quebec City)
- Barrie Memorial Hospital (Ormstown)

== Symbols of English-speaking Quebecers ==
Jacques Viger, the first mayor of Montreal, created the city's first coat of arms in 1833. The arms consisted of a red saltire surrounded by heraldic symbols to represent the cultural makeup of the municipality at the time. While a beaver represented the French community, he added a rose to represent those of English descent, a shamrock for the Irish, and a thistle for the Scottish. Current and former towns with sizeable Anglophone populations such as Sherbrooke, Lachine, Saint Michel, and Sainte-Cunégonde (now called Little Burgundy) also incorporated some or all of these same Anglophone symbols into their own respective arms. Subsequently, the beaver has usually been replaced by the fleur-de-lis to represent French-speakers.

While Viger's selection of heraldic symbols aptly represented Quebec's Anglophone population, the charges themselves were not unique Quebec inventions since they were borrowed from British heraldry. Over the years, without a truly unique symbol of their own, Quebec's Anglophones tended to gravitate towards British icons such as the Union Jack, the Red Ensign and then later on Canada's Maple Leaf. The flag of Montreal, where many Anglophones live, is also popular, as it resembles the flags of both Quebec and England.

In Spring 2007, an article was published in Flagscan (Issue 83 – ISSN 0833-1510) suggesting that Quebec's Anglophone population should adopt its own flag. The article noted that Francophone minority populations outside Quebec in the rest of Canada all had their own unique cultural identity flags and that the English-speaking community of Quebec should do the same. A number of possible designs were also presented. A variant of the same article was also posted over the internet.

Other than British heraldic charges, Quebec's Anglophone community still has no unique emblem representing itself that is officially recognized at any government level.

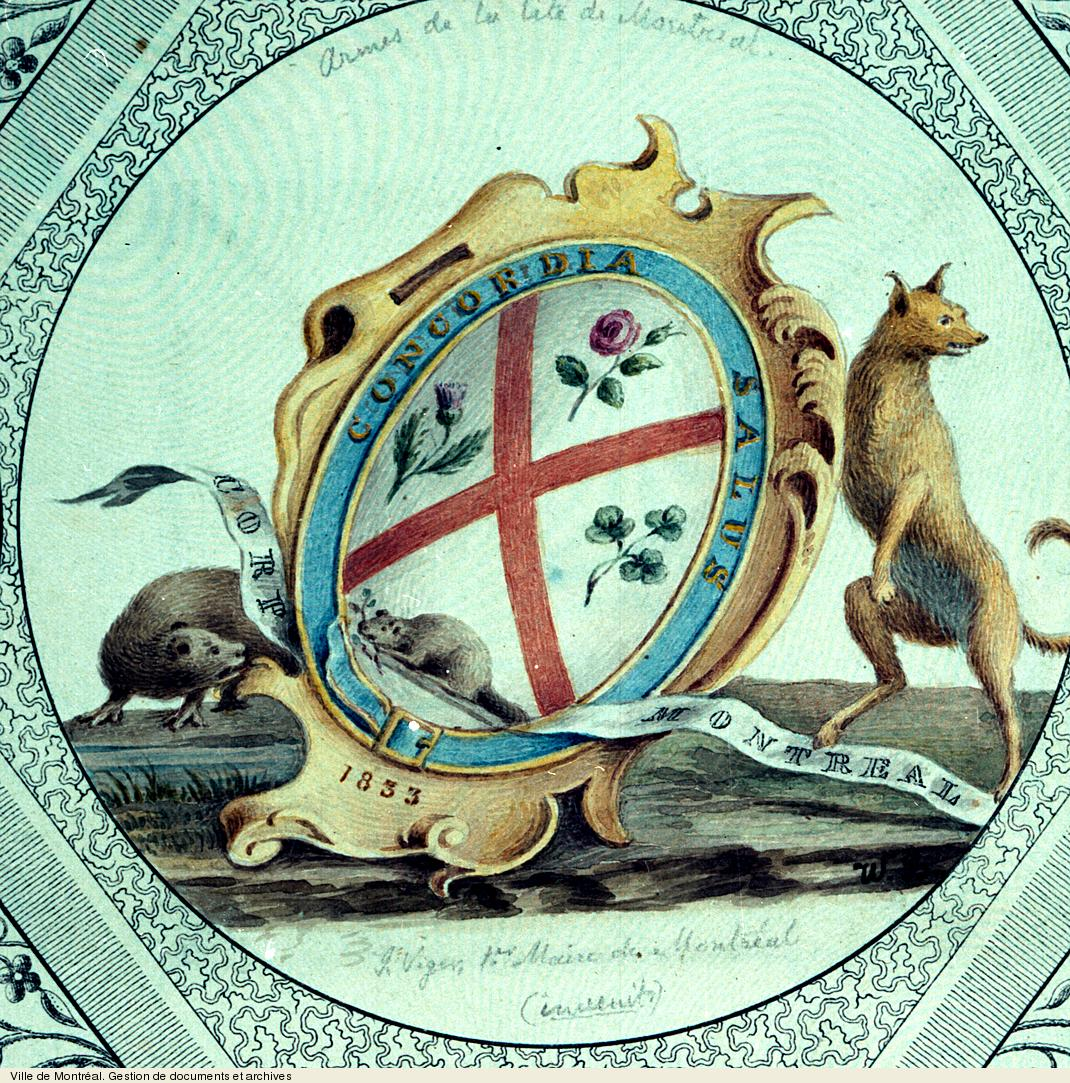
Coat of arms of Montreal, original version of 1833

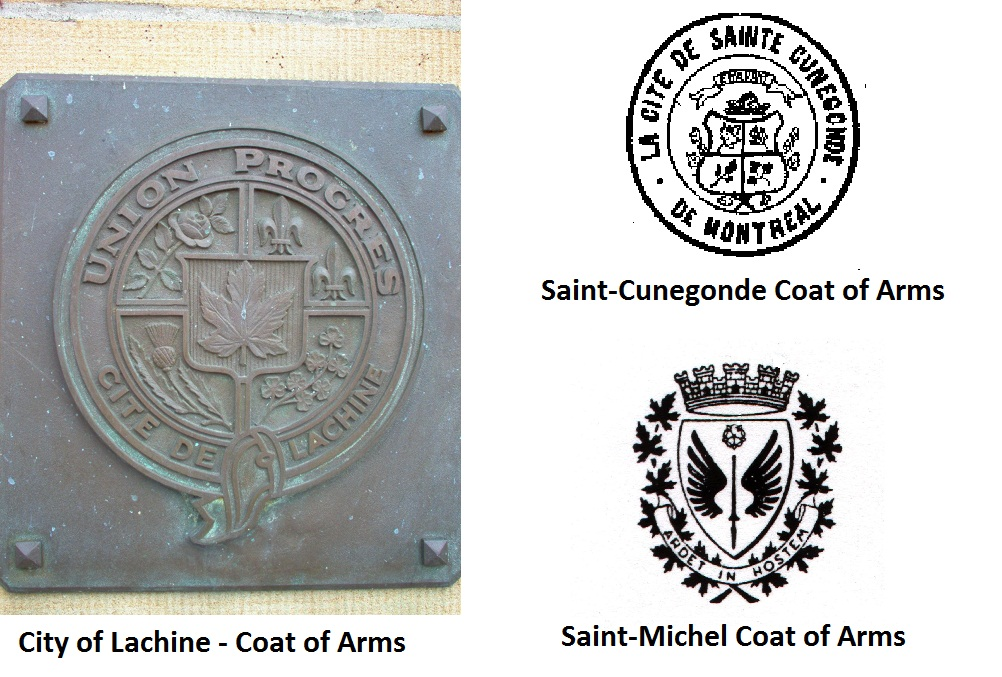
Coat of Arms of former cities in Montreal

Sherbrooke Coat of arms

Flag of Montreal

== See also ==
- English Canadian
- Franco-Ontarian
- List of English-speaking Quebecers
- List of anglophone communities in Québec
- List of Anglo-Quebecer musicians
- Scots-Quebecer
- Irish Quebecers
- Québécois
- Acadians
- Métis
- Official bilingualism in Canada
- The Rise and Fall of English Montreal
