= The Coloured Women's Club of Montreal =

Canadian women's organisation

- Abbreviation: CWCM
- Formation: 1902
- Founder: Anne Greenup
- Founded at: Little Burgundy, Montreal, Quebec, Canada
- Purpose: Humanitarian
- Formerly called: The Women’s Club of Montreal

The Coloured Women's Club of Montreal (CWCM) was founded in 1902 in Montreal, Canada, by seven African-Canadian women and has made significant contributions to Montreal's black community. It ran along the lines of the American National Association of Colored Women's Clubs, and its first president was Anne Greenup.

One of its first projects was attending to veterans returning from the Boer War. During the interwar years, the Club women taught on diet, management of money, and sanitation. It provided support to new mothers, clothes for new arrivals from the West Indies and America, soup kitchens, a black history library, and a burial ground at Mount Royal Cemetery. In 1907 the Club helped found the Union United Church.

The Coloured Women's Club Millennium Cookbook was compiled by Club members in 1999. In educating on the black diaspora in Canada, the Club organises tours including tracing routes on the Underground Railroad. The Anne Greenup Solidarity Prize, awarded annually by the Quebec Government, is named for the club's first president.

== Origins ==
The Coloured Women's Club of Montreal was established in 1902, as "The Women's Club of Montreal", by seven African-Canadian women whose husbands worked on the railways as sleeping car porters. It was led by Matilda "Tilly" Mays and Anne Greenup, who became the club's first president. It followed the examples of Harriet Tubman, Mary Church Terrell and Ida B. Wells who created the American National Association of Colored Women's Clubs in 1896. In 1904, the Club changed its name to "The Coloured Women's Club of Montreal".

== Activities ==
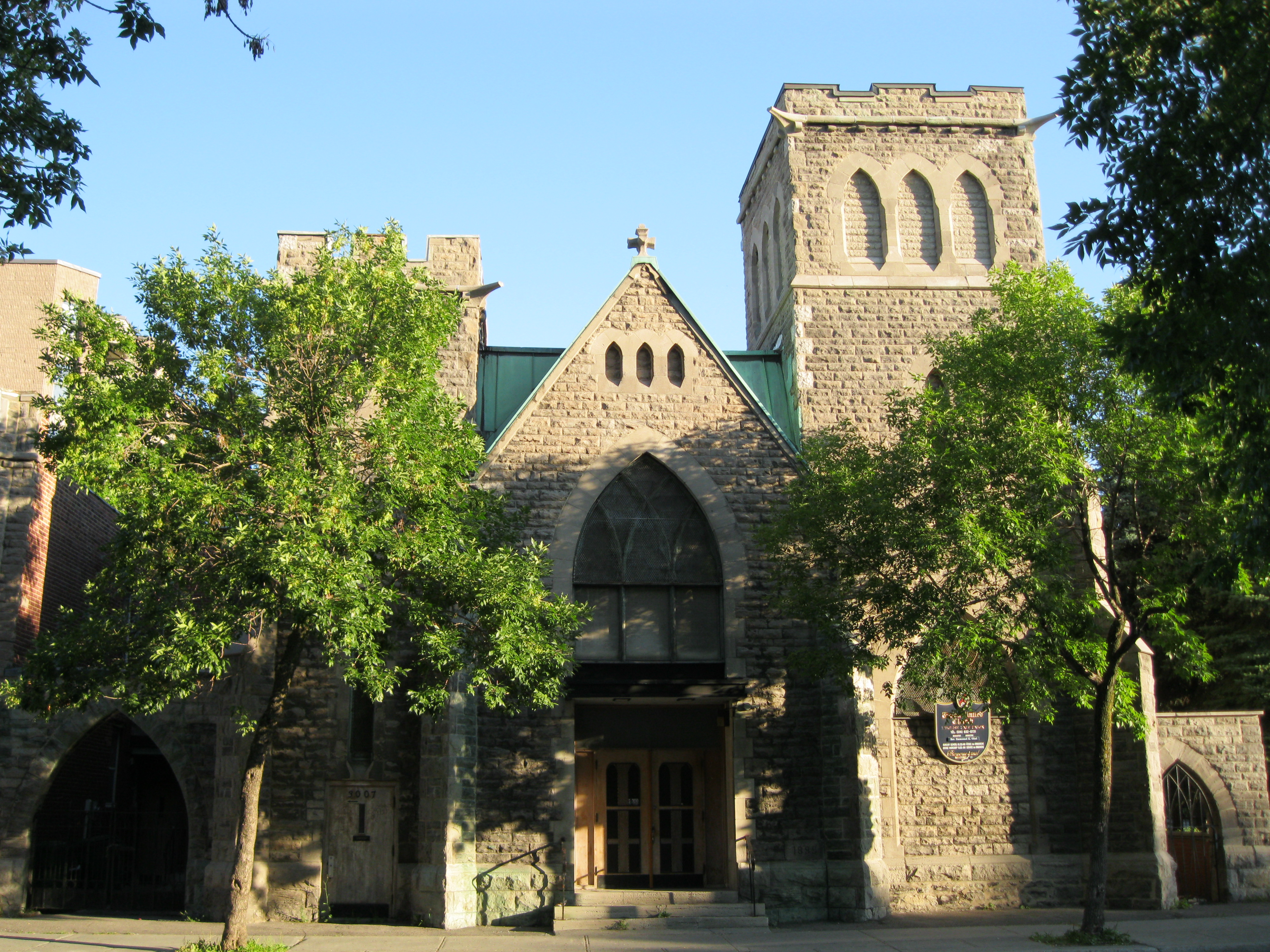
Union United Church

Initially, the Club concentrated on the requirements of their community in the vicinity of Little Burgundy, Montreal.

Attending to veterans returning from the Boer War was one of the first projects undertaken by the club. Its activities relating to organizing, feeding, and providing shelter and care, continued throughout the First World War, the Great Depression and World War II. During these years, the Club women operated across Canada and taught on diet, management of money, and sanitation. The Club's women provided support to new mothers, clothes for new arrivals from the West Indies and America, soup kitchens, a black history library, and they organised a burial ground at Mount Royal Cemetery.

The CWCM was considered a reliable ally of Reverend Charles H. Este. By 1934, Lena Robinson, the wife of John A. Robinson, served as a pastor at Winnipeg's Bethel African Methodist Episcopal Church. In 1907, the Club helped found the Union United Church, the oldest black church in Montreal and key to the development of the community, with which it collaborated to provide scholarships for black students.

== Later years ==
The CWCM made significant contributions to Montreal’s Black community both in its early years and later. The organisation's activities were recognised by the Ministry of Immigration, Francisation and Integration in 1995. In 1997, Shirley Giles became the Club's president.

In 1999, a group of Club members compiled The Coloured Women's Club Millennium Cookbook which sold more than 1,200 copies. In educating on the black diaspora in Canada, the Club organises tours to southern Ontario, Nova Scotia and the United States, tracing routes on the Underground Railroad.

In 2000, at the opening of the "Centennial Rose Garden" at Rideau Hall, Ottawa, a bench inscribed in honour of the Club was included. The Club was awarded the "Trailblazers Award" from the Black History Month Round Table in 2002.

The Anne Greenup Solidarity Prize, awarded annually by the Quebec Government, is named for the club's first president.

== See also ==
- Congress of Black Women of Canada
- National Congress of Black Women
