= Anne Greenup =

- Born: Anna Hurd; May 5, 1874; Harveysburg, Ohio, United States
- Died: March 15, 1952 (aged 77); Vernon, British Columbia, Canada
- Other names: Anna V. Greenup, Annie V. Greenup
- Occupation(s): schoolteacher, activist
- Years active: 1902-1910
- Known for: The co-founder and first president of the Coloured Women's Club of Montreal
- Spouse: Charles Harvey Greenup (1900-1920)

Anne Greenup (born Anna Hurd; May 5, 1874 – March 15, 1952) was the first president of The Coloured Women's Club of Montreal.

Greenup was born in Harveysburg, Ohio to Charles Hurd, a schoolteacher from Georgia, and Mahala Jackson from Virginia. She was educated until the age of 14 and then worked as a schoolteacher. She married Charles Harvey Greenup, a railroad worker, in Essex, Ontario in 1900. She and her husband soon moved to Montreal, where she founded The Coloured Women's Club of Montreal with six other women in 1902. As the first president of the club, she created a helped provide shelter, clothes and care for the Black community in Montreal, centred in the neighbourhood of Little Burgundy.

She and her husband moved to Vancouver around 1910, where he worked for the Canadian Pacific Railway until his death in 1920. In the 1920s, she was involved in the First Baptist Church on Burrard Street, organizing social activities.

She had two brothers, Robert and Granville, who were also schoolteachers and involved in an association of Black teachers. After the death of her husband, she lived with her brother Granville, who also moved to Vancouver and worked as a porter for the Canadian Pacific Railway. She had one child, who lived for around six months.

She died aged 77 in Vernon, British Columbia in 1952. A Canadian solidarity prize is named for her.
