= Emmett Johns =

Canadian priest and humanitarian (1928–2018)

The Reverend Emmett Johns CM GOQ
- Born: April 3, 1928; Montreal, Quebec, Canada
- Died: January 13, 2018 (aged 89); Montreal, Quebec, Canada
- Other names: Pops
- Occupation(s): Catholic priest, Humanitarian
- Years active: 1988–2016
- Known for: Dans la Rue

Ecclesiastical career
- Religion: Christianity
- Church: Roman Catholic Church
- Congregations served: Saint John Fischer Parish, Pointe-Claire; Our Lady of Fatima, Saint-Laurent

Emmett Mathias Joseph Johns CM GOQ (April 3, 1928 – January 13, 2018), was a Canadian priest and humanitarian. He was the founder of Dans la Rue (originally known as Le Bon Dieu Dans La Rue), a homeless shelter and support group for street youth in Montreal, Quebec.

== Life and career ==
Emmett Johns, who was of Irish descent, was born on April 3, 1928 in the Plateau Mont-Royal neighbourhood of Montreal.

He graduated with a BA from Loyola College in 1974.

He served as a Catholic priest and vicar at Saint John Fisher Parish in Pointe-Claire, Our Lady of Fatima in Saint-Laurent as well as a pastor at Bishop Whelan High School in Lachine and as a hospital chaplain.

In December 1988, Johns founded Le Bon Dieu Dans la Rue. With a $10,000 loan, he purchased a used motorhome and took to the streets at night, distributing food and basic goods to street youth, and giving them a place to warm up.

Over time, the organization grew to include both a night shelter in 1993 and day centre in 1997, always based on the "help without judgement" philosophy of its founder.

Its name was eventually changed to Dans La Rue, to avoid a religious connotation, and continued to offer food, shelter and friendship to homeless youths, as well as the resources and services required to help them get off the street.

In 2005, he was a member of the Quebec delegation which attended the funeral of Pope John Paul II.

In 2016, Johns retired from active involvement in Dans la Rue due to Parkinson's disease.

== Death ==
He died peacefully in a retirement home in Montreal on January 13, 2018, aged 89.

== Recognition and honours ==
Johns received many honours and awards for his work, including:

1997

- Honorary Doctorate Degree – Concordia University
- 12th Honor Roll of Excellence – Maclean's magazine

1998

- Humanitarian Award – The Association of Quebec Psychiatrists
- Anne Greenup Citizenship Award

1999

- Award of excellence – Montreal Urban Police
- Annual Desjardins Prize
- Member to the Order of Canada

2000

- Communications & Leadership Award from Toastmasters International

2001

- The Rights and Freedoms Prize – Commission des Droits de la personne et des droits à la jeunesse

2002

- Golden Jubilee Medal – Canadian Governors General
- Simon McDonaugh Humanitarian Award – United Irish Societies of Montreal
- Bishop Crowley Award – English Catholic Council
- Great Montrealer – The Academy of Great Montrealers

2003

- Honorary Doctorate Honoris Causea – McGill University
- Recipient – Medal of the University of Montreal
- Grand Officer – National Order of Quebec
- Honorary certificate – HEC Montreal / Commerce Magazine
- Prix de la Santé et du Bien-être social – Ordre des psychologues du Québec
- Honorary Doctorate Degree – Université du Québec à Montréal

2004

- Recipient – Reader's Digest Hero of the Year award
- Carrier of the Olympic Flame

2005

- Honorary Doctorate Honoris Causa – Saint Paul University

2006

- Documentary film on Pop's life called Notre Père launched
- Certificate Honorary Member – Canadian Pediatric Society

2008

- Biography published “Appelez-moi Pops”
- Martin Luther King Jr. Legacy Award

2009

- Montrealer closest to sainthood – Montreal Mirror ”Best of Montreal readers’ poll”
- Most trusted public personality – Magazine Sélection Reader's Digest

2010

- Montrealer closest to sainthood – Montreal Mirror ”Best of Montreal readers’ poll”

2011

- Recipient : Contribution to Humanity Award – Montreal Intercultural Dialogue institute
- Special concert in his honor by the MSO
- Montrealer closest to sainthood – Montreal Mirror ”Best of Montreal readers’ poll”
- Recipient : Prix de la tolérance Paul Gérin-Lajoie – Fondation de la tolérance Paul Gérin-Lajoie

2012

- Recipient : Queen Elizabeth II Diamond Jubilee Medal

2013

- Honorary Member – Ordre des travailleurs sociaux et thérapeutes conjugaux et familiaux du Québec

2016

- Commander – Ordre de Montréal
