= Moyra Allen =

Canadian nurse and professor

- Born: 1921
- Died: May 2, 1996 (aged 74–75)
- Awards: Order of Canada

F. Moyra Allen (1921 – May 2, 1996) was a Canadian nurse and professor. She helped develop the McGill Model of Nursing.

She received her nursing education at the Montreal General Hospital School of Nursing. She also received a Bachelor of Nursing from McGill University, a master's degree from the University of Chicago, and a Ph.D. in education from the Stanford Graduate School of Education in 1967. In 1954, she became an assistant professor at the McGill University School of Nursing. She became acting director of the School of Nursing in 1983, and retired in 1984.

In 1969, she founded the Nursing Papers, now called the Canadian Journal of Nursing Research.

In 1986, she was made an Officer of the Order of Canada. In 1979, she was awarded the Canadian Nurses Association Jeanne Mance Award, given to individuals who have made significant and innovative contributions to the health of Canadians.
