= Dans la Rue =

Canadian non-profit organization

- Chez Pops
- Formation: 1988
- Founder: Emmett Johns
- Founded at: Montreal
- Type: Non-profit
- Tax ID no.: 138449020 RR 0001
- Purpose: Homeless and at-risk youth ages 12–25
- Headquarters: 533 Rue Ontario Est (administrative); 1662 Rue Ontario Est (day centre)
- Services: Night shelter; Social reintegration; Psychological support; Food and basic needs; External referrals
- Official language: French, English
- Website: Danslarue.org

Dans la Rue (formerly known as Le Bon Dieu Dans la Rue) is a secular non-profit operating in English and French to meet the immediate needs of homeless and at-risk youth in the Centre-Sud area of Montreal.

== History ==
Dans la Rue was founded by in 1988 by Catholic priest Father Emmett "Pops" Johns, who sought to help homeless youth in a non-judgemental, open minded way .

With a personal loan of $10 000, he purchased a used winnebago and began driving nightly shifts through the streets of downtown Montreal, serving hot dogs and distributing clothing, personal care products, and nonperishable foods.

Over the years the organization grew, opening an overnight shelter in 1993, known as The Bunker, the Chez Pops day centre in 1997, as well permanent housing units, and family services.

Johns retired from active involvement in 2016 and died on January 13, 2018, aged 89.

In recent years Dans la Rue has been a co-organizer of Nuit dans la Rue, which raises awareness about homelessness in Canada.

== Services ==
Today Dans la Rue has evolved into a multi-disciplinary team of professionals and volunteers, headed by a leadership team and board of directors.

Chez Pops Day Centre: Since 1997, the day centre offers a wide variety of services including basic needs (food, clothing, showers), access to social workers and health care professionals as well as job training and help finding housing. Other services offered include music and art therapy and continued education.

The Bunker: Since 1993, The Bunker operates as a night shelter for youth ages 12 to 21.

The Van: Since 1988, The Van, a modified motorcade, distributes food (traditionally hot dogs) and other not perishable items nightly throughout downtown Montreal and the surrounding areas.

== Popular culture ==
Episode 6 of Historia's Dans Les Pas De documentary series is about Dans La Rue and its activities.

The 2020 non-fiction novel L'Enfer d'une Fille de Rue also focuses on the organization and street youth in Montreal more broadly.

== Bibliography ==
- Karabanow, J. (1999). Creating community: a case study of a Montreal street kid agency. Community development journal, v. 34 (4), 318. Doi:10.1300/J137v13n02_04
- Karabanow, J. (2008). Getting off the street: Exploring the process of young people's street exits. American Behavioral Scientist, 51, 772. DOI: 10.1177/0002764207311987
- Boivin, J.F., & Roy, É., & Haley, N., Galbaud du Fort, G,. (2005). The health of street youth. Canadian journal of public health, v.96(6), 432. Retrieved from

http://www.med.mcgill.ca/epidemiology/courses/EPIB591/Fall%202010/Class%201%20-%201%20Sept/Boivin%20-%20Canadian%20J%20Public%20Health%202005.pdf

- Curran Peggy. (2012, Feb. 15). More kids on street, more calls for help: Demands dealt with by Dans la rue have broadened, as problems faced by street kids become more complex. Part 1 of 2. The Montreal Gazette. Retrieved from https://montrealgazette.com/news/More+kids+street+more+calls+help/6153169/story.html
- Curran Peggy. (2012, Feb. 16) For street people of all ages, mental health a critical issue. Part 2 or 2. The Montreal Gazette. Retrieved from https://montrealgazette.com/news/Mental+illness+rise+street+people/6159806/story.html
- Schwartz, Susan. (2001, October 3). Tasteful charity event for Dans la rue. The Montreal Gazette. Retrieved from https://montrealgazette.com/technology/Tasteful+charity+event+Dans/5492026/story.html
- Clara Chapdelaine, C. & Aroni, F. (2007). Child Justice in Canada and the Four Ps: Protection, Prosecition, Prevention, and Participation. Canadian Criminology, 15(3). pp 267–284. DOI: 10.1007/s10612-007-9036-2
