= Irish Canadians =

Canadian citizens with full or partial Irish heritage

Irish Canadians _{French: Irlando-Canadiens Irish: Gael-Cheanadaigh}
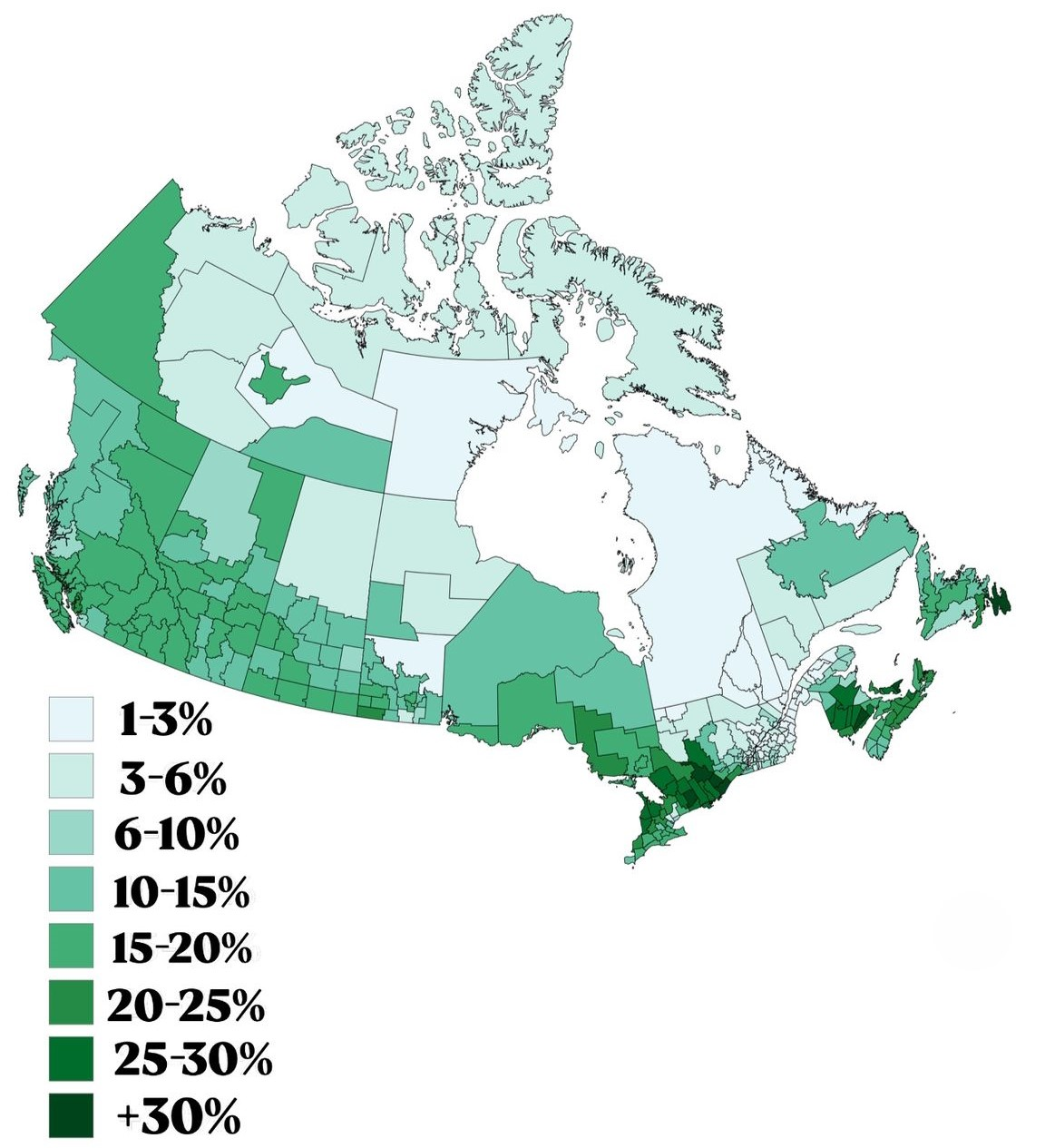
- Population distribution of Irish Canadians by census division, 2021 census

Total population
- 4,627,000; 13.4% of the Canadian population (2016)

Regions with significant populations
- Ontario: 2,095,460
- British Columbia: 675,135
- Alberta: 596,750
- Quebec: 446,215
- Nova Scotia: 201,655
- New Brunswick: 135,835
- Newfoundland and Labrador: 106,225

Languages
- English · French · Irish (historically)

Religion
- Christianity (Roman Catholicism, Protestantism)

Related ethnic groups
- Irish, Ulster-Scots, English Canadians, Scottish Canadians, Welsh Canadians, Irish Americans, Scotch-Irish Canadians

Irish Canadians (Irish: Gael-Cheanadaigh) are Canadian citizens who have full or partial Irish heritage including descendants who trace their ancestry to immigrants who originated in Ireland. 1.2 million Irish immigrants arrived from 1825 to 1970, and at least half of those in the period from 1831 to 1850. By 1867, they were the second largest ethnic group (after the French), and comprised 24% of Canada's population. The 1931 national census counted 1,230,000 Canadians of Irish descent, half of whom lived in Ontario. About one-third were Catholic in 1931 and two-thirds Protestant.

The Irish immigrants were majority Protestant before the Irish famine years of the late 1840s, when far more Catholics than Protestants arrived. Even larger numbers of Catholics headed to the United States; others went to Great Britain and Australia.

Irish Canadians comprise a subgroup of European Canadians. (Note: Statistics Canada demi-decadal censuses officially use the name "British Isles Origins" for the various nationalities and ethnicities that are in the region. See 2016, 2011, or 2006 censuses as examples) According to the 2021 census, in terms of religion, 2,437,810 (55%) of Irish Canadians identified as Christian at the census compared to 1,905,155 identifying as secular or non-religious (43%). 1,228,640 (28%) identified as Roman Catholic and 1,190,000 (27%) identified as belonging to a Protestant denomination.

== History ==
Irish Canadian Population History
Year	Pop.	±%
1871	846,414	—
1881	957,403	+13.1%
1901	988,721	+3.3%
1911	1,074,738	+8.7%
1921	1,107,803	+3.1%
1931	1,230,808	+11.1%
1941	1,267,702	+3.0%
1951	1,439,635	+13.6%
1961	1,753,351	+21.8%
1971	1,581,730	−9.8%
1981	1,151,955	−27.2%
1986	3,622,290	+214.4%
1991	3,783,355	+4.4%
1996	3,767,610	−0.4%
2001	3,822,660	+1.5%
2006	4,354,155	+13.9%
2011	4,544,870	+4.4%
2016	4,627,000	+1.8%
Source: Statistics Canada Note1: 1981 Canadian census did not include multiple ethnic origin responses, thus population is an undercount. Note2: 1996–present census populations are undercounts, due to the creation of the "Canadian" ethnic origin category.

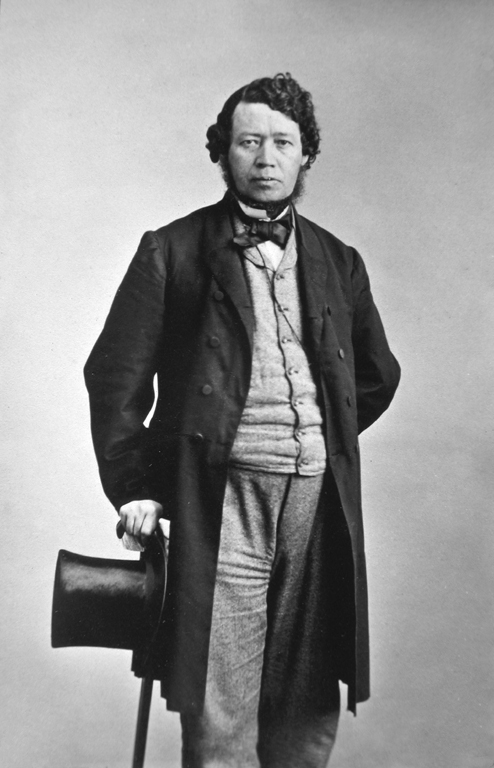
Father of Confederation D'Arcy McGee

=== Early arrival ===
The first recorded Irish presence in the area of present-day Canada dates from 1536, when Irish fishermen from Cork travelled to Newfoundland.

After the permanent settlement in Newfoundland by Irish in the late 18th and early 19th century, overwhelmingly from counties Waterford and Wexford, increased immigration of the Irish elsewhere in Canada began in the decades following the War of 1812 and formed a significant part of The Great Migration of Canada. Between 1825 and 1845, 60% of all immigrants to Canada were Irish; in 1831 alone, some 34,000 arrived in Montreal.

Between 1830 and 1850, 624,000 Irish arrived; in contextual terms, at the end of this period, the population of the provinces of Canada was 2.4 million. Besides Upper Canada (Ontario), Lower Canada (Quebec), the Maritime colonies of Nova Scotia, Prince Edward Island and New Brunswick, especially Saint John, were arrival points. Not all remained; many out-migrated to the United States or to Western Canada in the decades that followed. Few returned to Ireland.

During the Great Famine of Ireland (1845–52), Canada received the most destitute Irish Catholics, who left Ireland in grave circumstances. Land estate owners in Ireland would either evict landholder tenants to board on returning empty lumber ships, or in some cases pay their fares. Others left on ships from the overcrowded docks in Liverpool and Cork.

Most of the Irish immigrants who came to Canada and the United States in the nineteenth century and before were Irish speakers, with many knowing no other language on arrival.

=== Settlement ===
The great majority of Irish Catholics arrived in Grosse Isle, an island in Quebec in the St. Lawrence River, which housed the immigration reception station. Thousands died or arrived sick and were treated in the hospital (equipped for less than one hundred patients) in the summer of 1847; in fact, many ships that reached Grosse-Île had lost the bulk of their passengers and crew, and much more died in quarantine on or near the island. From Grosse-Île, most survivors were sent to Quebec City and Montreal, where the existing Irish community grew. The orphaned children were adopted into Quebec families and accordingly became Québécois, both linguistically and culturally. At the same time, ships with the starving also docked at Partridge Island, New Brunswick in similarly desperate circumstances.

A large number of the families that survived continued on to settle in Canada West (now Ontario) and provided a cheap labour pool and colonization of land in a rapidly expanding economy in the decades after their arrival.

In comparison with the Irish who went to the United States or Britain, many Irish arrivals in Canada settled in rural areas, in addition to the cities.

The Catholic Irish and Protestant (Orange) Irish were often in conflict from the 1840s. In Ontario, the Irish fought with the French for control of the Catholic Church, with the Irish successful. In that instance, the Irish sided with the Protestants to oppose the demand for French-language Catholic schools.

Thomas D'Arcy McGee, an Irish-Montreal journalist, became a Father of Confederation in 1867. An Irish Republican in his early years, he would moderate his view in later years and become a passionate advocate of Confederation. He was instrumental in enshrining educational rights for Catholics as a minority group in the Canadian Constitution. In 1868, he was assassinated in Ottawa. Historians are not sure who the murderer was, or what his motivations were. One theory is that a Fenian, Patrick James Whelan, was the assassin, attacking McGee for his recent anti-Raid statements. Others argue that Whelan was used as a scapegoat.

After Confederation, Irish Catholics faced more hostility, especially from Protestant Irish in Ontario, which was under the political sway of the already entrenched anti-Catholic Orange Order. The anthem "The Maple Leaf Forever", written and composed by Scottish immigrant and Orangeman Alexander Muir, reflects the pro-British Ulster loyalism outlook typical of the time with its disdainful view of Irish Republicanism. This only amplified with Fenian Raids of the time. As the Irish became more prosperous and newer groups arrived on Canada's shores, tensions subsided through the remainder the latter part of the 19th century.

In the years between 1815, when vast industrial changes began to disrupt the old life-styles in Europe, and Canadian Confederation in 1867, when immigration of that era passed its peak, more than 150,000 immigrants from Ireland flooded into Saint John, New Brunswick. Those who came in the earlier period were largely tradesmen, and many stayed in Saint John, becoming the backbone of its builders. But when the Great Famine raged between 1845 and 1852, huge waves of refugees arrived at these shores. It is estimated that between 1845 and 1847, some 30,000 arrived, more people than were living in the city at the time. In 1847, dubbed "Black 47", one of the worst years of the Famine, some 16,000 immigrants, most of them from Ireland, arrived at Partridge Island, the immigration and quarantine station at the mouth of Saint John Harbour. From 1840 to 1860 sectarian violence was rampant in Saint John resulting in some of the worst urban riots in Canadian history.

== Demography ==
Canadians of Irish descent total population (1871–2016)
Note1: 1981 Canadian census did not include multiple ethnic origin responses, thus population is an undercount.
Note2: 1996–present census populations are undercounts, due to the creation of the "Canadian" ethnic origin category. View source data.
Canadians of Irish descent percentage of the total population (1871–2016)
Note1: 1981 Canadian census did not include multiple ethnic origin responses, thus population is an undercount.
Note2: 1996–present census populations are undercounts, due to the creation of the "Canadian" ethnic origin category. View source data.

=== Population ===
Irish Canadian Population History 1871–2016
Year	Population	% of total population
1871	846,414	24.282%
1881	957,403	22.137%
1901	988,721	18.407%
1911	1,074,738	14.913%
1921	1,107,803	12.606%
1931	1,230,808	11.861%
1941	1,267,702	11.017%
1951	1,439,635	10.276%
1961	1,753,351	9.614%
1971	1,581,730	7.334%
1981	1,151,955	4.783%
1986	3,622,290	14.476%
1991	3,783,355	14.016%
1996	3,767,610	13.207%
2001	3,822,660	12.897%
2006	4,354,155	13.937%
2011	4,544,870	13.834%
2016	4,627,000	13.427%

=== Religion ===
==== Protestantism and Catholicism ====
Tensions between the Irish Protestants and Irish Catholics were widespread in Canada in the 19th century, with many episodes of violence and anger, especially in Atlantic Canada and Ontario.

In New Brunswick, from 1840 to the 1860s sectarian violence was rampant in Saint John resulting in some of the worst urban riots in Canadian history. The city was shaped by Irish ghettos at York Point, and suppression of poor, Irish-speaking peoples rights lead to decades of turmoil. The division would continue to shape Saint John in years to come.

The Orange Order, with its two main tenets, anti-Catholicism and loyalty to Britain, flourished in Ontario. Largely coincident with Protestant Irish settlement, its role pervaded the political, social and community as well as religious lives of its followers. Spatially, Orange lodges were founded as Irish Protestant settlement spread north and west from its original focus on the Lake Ontario plain. Although the number of active members, and thus their influence, may have been overestimated, the Orange influence was considerable and comparable to the Catholic influence in Quebec.

In Montreal in 1853, the Orange Order organized speeches by the fiercely anti-Catholic and anti-Irish former priest Alessandro Gavazzi, resulting in a violent confrontation between the Irish and the Scots. St. Patrick's Day processions in Toronto were often disrupted by tensions, that boiled over to the extent that the parade was cancelled permanently by the mayor in 1878 and not re-instituted until 110 years later in 1988. The Jubilee Riots of 1875 jarred Toronto in a time when sectarian tensions ran at their highest. Irish Catholics in Toronto were an embattled minority among a Protestant population that included a large Irish Protestant contingent strongly committed to the Orange Order.

Irish Canadian demography by religion
Religious group	2021 (Note: Religious breakdown proportions based on "Irish" ethnic or cultural origin response on the 2021 census.)		2001 (Note: Religious breakdown proportions based on "Irish" ethnic or cultural origin response on the 2001 census.)	
Religious group	Pop.	%	Pop.	%
Christianity	2,437,810	55.24%	3,080,785	80.59%
Islam	5,055	0.11%	2,380	0.06%
Irreligion	1,905,155	43.17%	711,190	18.6%
Judaism	10,295	0.23%	7,210	0.19%
Buddhism	7,765	0.18%	5,840	0.15%
Hinduism	1,160	0.03%	645	0.02%
Indigenous spirituality	3,500	0.08%	3,670	0.1%
Sikhism	505	0.01%	355	0.01%
Other	41,860	0.95%	10,585	0.28%
Total Irish Canadian population	4,413,120	100%	3,822,665	100%

Irish Canadian demography by Christian sects
Religious group	2021		2001	
Religious group	Pop.	%	Pop.	%
Catholic	1,228,640	50.4%	1,401,455	45.49%
Orthodox	9,270	0.38%	6,990	0.23%
Protestant	929,205	38.12%	1,572,880	51.05%
Other Christian	270,695	11.1%	99,460	3.23%
Total Irish Canadian Christian population	2,437,810	100%	3,080,785	100%

== Geographical distribution ==
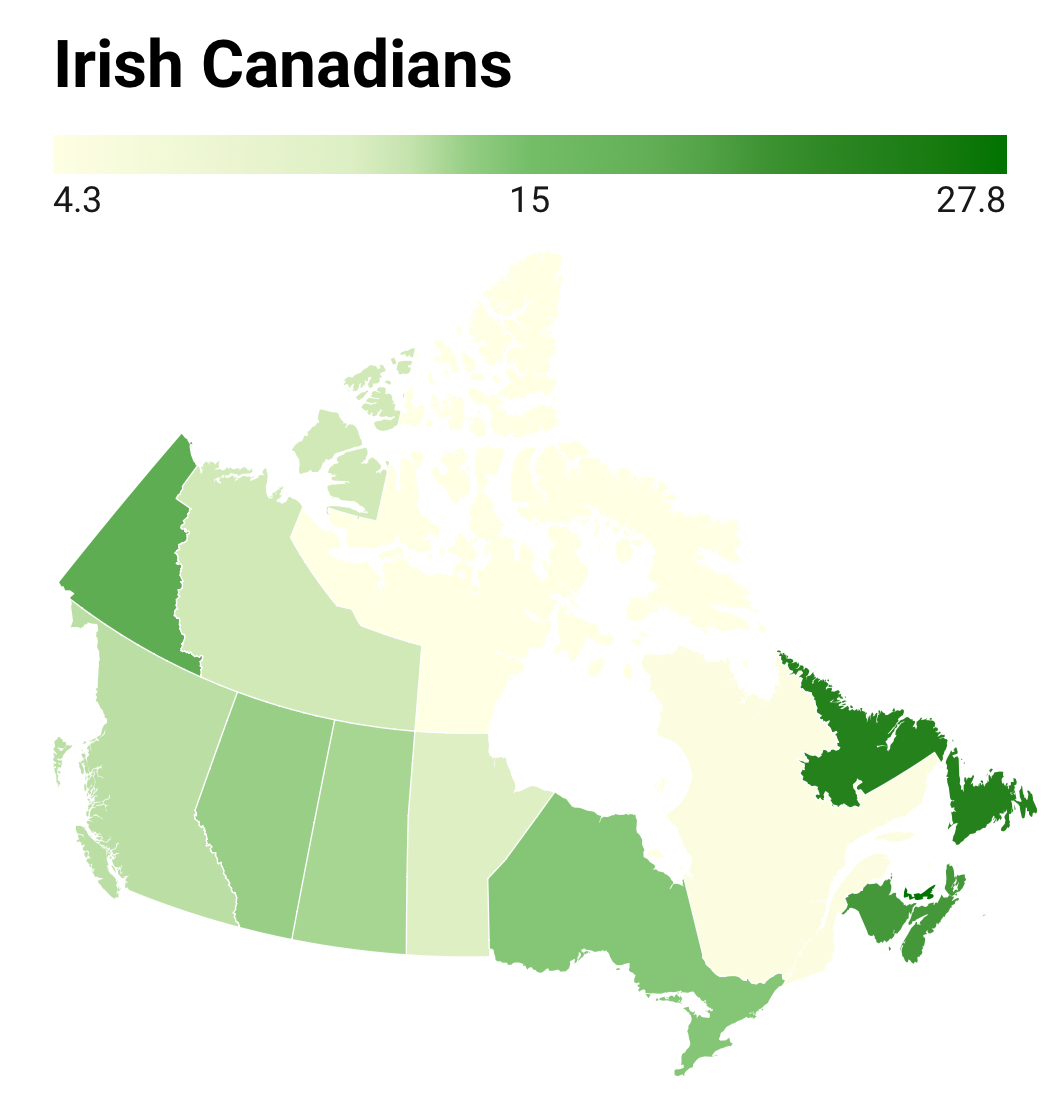
Irish percent in Canada by province/territory, 2021 census

Irish Canadians by province and territory (2001–2016)
Province/Territory	2016		2011		2006		2001	
Province/Territory	Pop.	%	Pop.	%	Pop.	%	Pop.	%
Ontario	2,095,465	15.82%	2,069,110	16.35%	1,988,940	16.53%	1,761,280	15.61%
British Columbia	675,130	14.8%	643,470	14.88%	618,120	15.17%	562,895	14.55%
Alberta	596,750	15%	565,120	15.84%	539,160	16.56%	461,065	15.68%
Quebec	446,210	5.6%	428,570	5.54%	406,085	5.46%	291,545	4.09%
Manitoba	156,145	12.59%	155,455	13.24%	151,915	13.4%	143,950	13.04%
Saskatchewan	155,725	14.55%	156,655	15.53%	145,475	15.25%	139,205	14.45%
Nova Scotia	195,865	21.56%	201,655	22.25%	195,365	21.63%	178,585	19.9%
New Brunswick	147,245	20.15%	159,195	21.63%	150,705	20.94%	135,835	18.87%
Newfoundland and Labrador	106,220	20.74%	110,370	21.76%	107,390	21.45%	100,260	19.73%
Prince Edward Island	38,505	27.57%	41,715	30.37%	39,170	29.19%	37,170	27.87%
Northwest Territories	5,060	12.3%	4,845	11.88%	4,860	11.84%	4,470	12.05%
Yukon	6,930	19.74%	7,315	21.95%	5,735	18.99%	5,455	19.12%
Nunavut	1,740	4.89%	1,385	4.37%	1,220	4.16%	950	3.56%
Canada	4,627,000	13.43%	4,544,870	13.83%	4,354,155	13.94%	3,822,660	12.9%

The graph excludes those who have only some Irish ancestry. Historian and journalist Louis-Guy Lemieux claims that about 40% of Quebecers have Irish ancestry on at least one side of their family tree. Shunned by Protestant English-speakers, it was not uncommon for Catholic Irish to settle among and intermarry with the Catholic French-speakers. Considering that many other Canadians throughout Canada likewise have Irish roots, in addition to those who may simply identify as Canadian, the total number of Canadians with some Irish ancestry extrapolated would include a significant proportion of the Canadian population.

=== Quebec ===
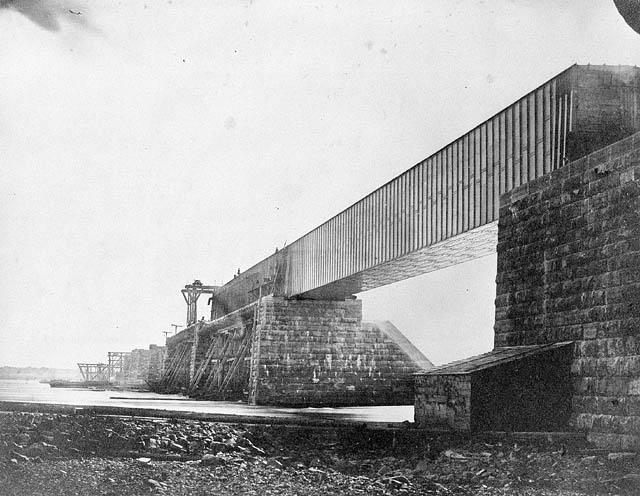
Victoria Bridge under construction in Montreal, as photographed by William Notman

Irish established communities in both urban and rural Quebec. Irish immigrants arrived in large numbers in Montreal during the 1840s and were hired as labourers to build the Victoria Bridge, living in a tent city at the foot of the bridge. Here, workers unearthed a mass grave of 6,000 Irish immigrants who had died at nearby Windmill Point in the typhus outbreak of 1847–48. The Irish Commemorative Stone or "Black Rock", as it is commonly known, was erected by bridge workers to commemorate the tragedy.

The Irish would go on to settle permanently in the close-knit working-class neighbourhoods of Pointe-Saint-Charles, Verdun, Saint-Henri, Griffintown and Goose Village, Montreal. With the help of Quebec's Catholic Church, they would establish their own churches, schools, and hospitals. St. Patrick's Basilica was founded in 1847 and served Montreal's English-speaking Catholics for over a century. Loyola College was founded by the Jesuits to serve Montreal's mostly Irish English-speaking Catholic community in 1896. Saint Mary's Hospital was founded in the 1920s and continues to serve Montreal's present-day English-speaking population.

The St. Patrick's Day Parade in Montreal is one of the oldest in North America, dating back to 1824.

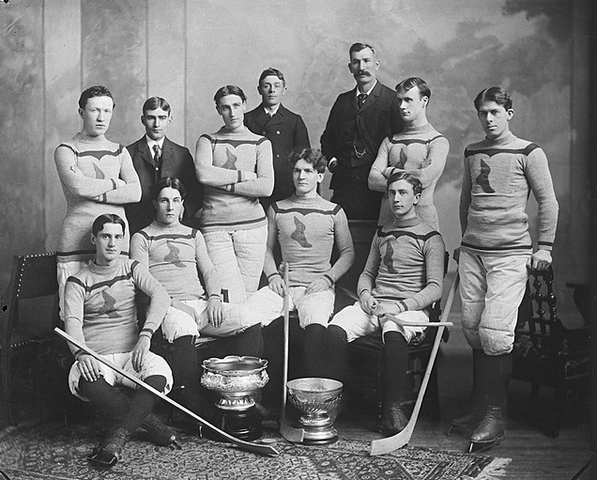
Montreal Shamrocks with 1899 Stanley Cup

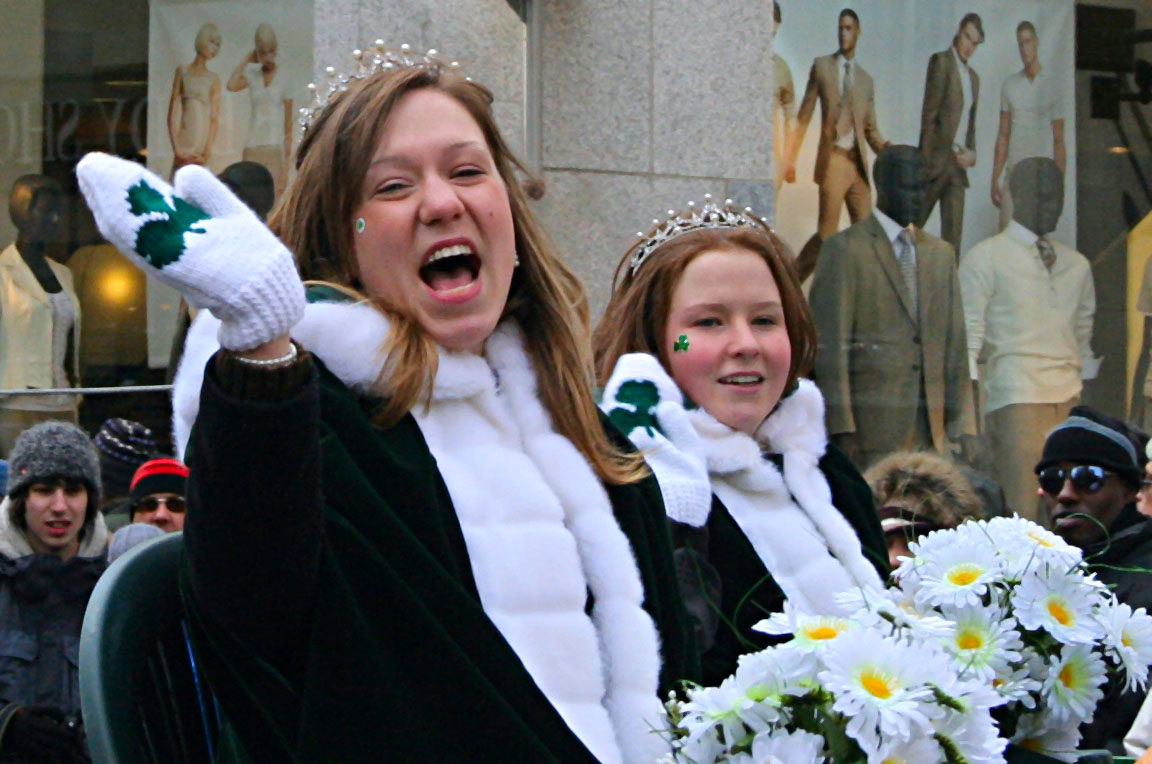
Saint Patrick's Day Parade in Montreal

The Irish would also settle in large numbers in Quebec City and establish communities in rural Quebec, particularly in Pontiac, Gatineau and Papineau where there was an active timber industry. However, most would move on to larger North American cities.

Today, many Québécois have some Irish ancestry. Examples from political leaders include Laurence Cannon, Claude Ryan, the former Premiers Daniel Johnson and Jean Charest, Georges Dor (born Georges-Henri Dore), and former Prime Ministers Louis St. Laurent and Brian Mulroney. The Irish constitute the second largest ethnic group in the province after French Canadians.

=== Ontario ===
From the times of early European settlement in the 17th and 18th centuries, the Irish had been coming to Ontario, in small numbers and in the service of New France, as missionaries, soldiers, geographers and fur trappers. After the creation of British North America in 1763, Protestant Irish, both Irish Anglicans and Ulster-Scottish Presbyterians, had been migrating over the decades to Upper Canada, some as United Empire Loyalists or directly from Ulster.

In the years after the War of 1812, increasing numbers of Irish, a growing proportion of them Catholic, were venturing to Canada to obtain work on projects such as canals, roads, early railroads and in the lumber industry. The labourers were known as ‘navvies’ and built much of the early infrastructure in the province. Settlement schemes offering cheap (or free) land brought over farming families, with many being from Munster (particularly counties Tipperary and Cork). Peter Robinson organized land settlements of Catholic tenant farmers in the 1820s to areas of rural Eastern Ontario, which helped establish Peterborough as a regional centre.

The Irish were instrumental in the building of the Rideau Canal and subsequent settlement along its route. Alongside French-Canadians, thousands of Irish laboured in difficult conditions and terrain. Hundreds, if not thousands, died from malaria.

==== Famine in Ireland ====
The Great Irish Hunger 1845–1849, had a large impact on Ontario. At its peak in the summer of 1847, boatloads of sick migrants arrived in desperate circumstances on steamers from Quebec to Bytown (soon to be Ottawa), and to ports of call on Lake Ontario, chief amongst them Kingston and Toronto, in addition to many other smaller communities across southern Ontario. Quarantine facilities were hastily constructed to accommodate them. Nurses, doctors, priests, nuns, compatriots, some politicians and ordinary citizens aided them. Thousands died in Ontario that summer alone, mostly from typhus.

How permanent a settlement was depended on circumstances. A case in point is Irish immigration to North Hastings County, Canada West, which happened after 1846. Most of the immigrants were attracted to North Hastings by free land grants beginning in 1856. Three Irish settlements were established in North Hastings: Umfraville, Doyle's Corner, and O'Brien Settlement. The Irish were primarily Roman Catholic. Crop failures in 1867 halted the road program near the Irish settlements, and departing settlers afterward outnumbered new arrivals. By 1870, only the successful settlers, most of whom were farmers who raised grazing animals, remained.

In the 1840s, the major challenge for the Catholic Church was keeping the loyalty of the very poor Catholic arrivals during marches. The fear was that Protestants might use their material needs as a wedge for evangelicalization. In response the Church built a network of charitable institutions such as hospitals, schools, boarding homes, and orphanages, to meet the need and keep people inside the faith. The Catholic church was less successful in dealing with tensions between its French and the Irish clergy; eventually the Irish took control.

==== Sectarian tensions ====
Toronto had similar numbers of both Irish Protestants and Irish Catholics. Riots or conflicts repeatedly broke out from 1858 to 1878, such as during the annual St. Patrick's Day parade or during various religious processions, which culminated in the Jubilee Riots of 1875. These tensions had increased following the organized but failed Fenian Raids at points along the American border, which arose suspicions by Protestants of Catholics' sympathies toward the Fenian cause. The Irish population essentially defined the Catholic population in Toronto until 1890, when German and French Catholics were welcomed to the city by the Irish, but the Irish were still 90% of the Catholic population. However, various powerful initiatives such as the foundation of St. Michael's College in 1852 (where Marshall McLuhan held the chair of English until his death in 1980), three hospitals, and the most significant charitable organizations in the city (the Society of St. Vincent de Paul) and House of Providence created by Irish Catholic groups strengthened the Irish identity, transforming the Irish presence in the city into one of influence and power.

From 1840 to 1860 sectarian violence was rampant in Saint John, New Brunswick resulting in some of the worst urban riots in Canadian history. Orange Order parades ended in rioting with Catholics, many Irish-speaking, fighting against increased marginalization trapped in Irish ghettos at York Point and North End areas such as Portland Point. Nativist Protestants had secured their dominance over the city's political systems at the peak of the famine, which saw the New Brunswick city's demographics completely changed with waves of immigration. In three years alone, 1844 to 1847, 30,000 Irish came to Partridge Island, a quarantine station in the city's harbour.

==== Economic mobility and integration ====
An economic boom and growth in the years after their arrival allowed many Irish men to obtain steady employment on the rapidly expanding railroad network, settlements developed or expanded along or close to the Grand Trunk Railroad corridor often in rural areas, allowing many to farm the relatively cheap, arable land of southern Ontario. Employment opportunities in the cities, in Toronto but elsewhere, occupations included construction, liquor processing (see Distillery District), Great Lakes shipping, and manufacturing. Women generally entered into domestic service. In more remote areas, employment centred around the Ottawa Valley timber trade which eventually extending into Northern Ontario along with railroad building and mining. There was a strong Irish rural presence in Ontario in comparison to their brethren in the northern US, but they were also numerous in the towns and cities.

Redclift (2003) concluded that many of the one million migrants, mainly of British and Irish origin, who arrived in Canada in the mid-19th century benefited from the availability of land and absence of social barriers to mobility. This enabled them to think and feel like citizens of the new country in a way denied them back in the old country.

Akenson (1984) argued that the Canadian experience of Irish immigrants is not comparable to the American one. He contended that the numerical dominance of Protestants within the national group and the rural basis of the Irish community negated the formation of urban ghettos and allowed for a relative ease in social mobility. In comparison, the American Irish in the Northeast and Midwest were dominantly Catholic, urban dwelling, and ghettoized. There was however, the existence of Irish-centric ghettos in Toronto (Corktown, Cabbagetown, Trinity Niagara, the Ward) at the fringes of urban development, at least for the first few decades after the famine and in the case of Trefann Court, a holdout against public housing and urban renewal, up to the 1970s. This was also the case in other Canadian cities with significant Irish Catholic populations such as Montreal, Ottawa and Saint John.

Likewise the new labour historians believe that the rise of the Knights of Labor caused the Orange and Catholic Irish in Toronto to resolve their generational hatred and set about to form a common working-class culture. This theory presumes that Irish-Catholic culture was of little value, to be rejected with such ease. Nicolson (1985) argues that neither theory is valid. He says that in the ghettos of Toronto the fusion of an Irish peasant culture with traditional Catholism produced a new, urban, ethno-religious vehicle – Irish Tridentine Catholism. This culture spread from the city to the hinterland and, by means of metropolitan linkage, throughout Ontario. Privatism created a closed Irish society, and, while Irish Catholics cooperated in labour organizations for the sake of their families' future, they never shared in the development of a new working-class culture with their old Orange enemies.

McGowan argues that between 1890 and 1920, the city's Catholics experienced major social, ideological, and economic changes that allowed them to integrate into Toronto society and shake off their second-class status. The Irish Catholics (in contrast to the French) strongly supported Canada's role in the First World War. They broke out of the ghetto and lived in all of Toronto's neighbourhoods. Starting as unskilled labourers, they used high levels of education to move up and were well represented among the lower middle class. Most dramatically, they intermarried with Protestants at an unprecedented rate.

==== Confederation ====
With Canadian Confederation in 1867, Catholics were granted a separate school board. Through the late 19th and early 20th century, Irish immigration to Ontario continued but a slower pace, much of it family reunification. Out-migration of Irish in Ontario (along with others) occurred during this period following economic downturns, available new land and mining booms in the US or the Canadian West. The reverse is true of those with Irish descent who migrated to Ontario from the Maritimes and Newfoundland seeking work, mostly since World War II.

In 1877, a breakthrough in Irish Canadian Protestant-Catholic relations occurred in London, Ontario. This was the founding of the Irish Benevolent Society, a brotherhood of Irishmen and women of both Catholic and Protestant faiths. The society promoted Irish Canadian culture, but it was forbidden for members to speak of Irish politics when meeting. Today, the society is still operating.

Some writers have assumed that the Irish in 19th-century North America were impoverished. DiMatteo (1992), using evidence from probate records in 1892, shows this is untrue. Irish-born and Canadian-born Irish accumulated wealth in a similar way, and that being Irish was not an economic disadvantage by the 1890s. Immigrants from earlier decades may well have experienced greater economic difficulties, but in general the Irish in Ontario in the 1890s enjoyed levels of wealth commensurate with the rest of the populace.

By 1901 Ontario Irish Catholics and Scottish Presbyterians were among the most likely to own homes, while Anglicans did only moderately well, despite their traditional association with Canada's elite. French-speaking Catholics in Ontario achieved wealth and status less readily than Protestants and Irish Catholics. Although differences in attainment existed between people of different religious denominations, the difference between Irish Catholics and Irish Protestants in urban Canada was relatively insignificant.

==== 20th century ====
Ciani (2008) concludes that support of World War I fostered an identity among Irish Catholics as loyal citizens and helped integrate them into the social fabric of the nation. Rev. Michael Fallon, the Catholic bishop of London, sided with the Protestants against the French Catholics. His primary motive was to advance the cause of Irish Catholics in Canada and abroad; he had significant support from the Vatican. He opposed the French Canadian Catholics, especially by opposing bilingual education. French Canadians did not participate in Fallon's efforts to support the war effort and became more marginalized in Ontario politics and society.

During the Troubles (1969–1998) in Northern Ireland, although not as responsive as Irish Americans, Irish Canadians nevertheless responded to the conflict. In August 1969, some 150 Irish Canadians in Toronto announced that they intended to send money, which could be used to buy guns if necessary, to the Catholic women and children of the Bogside in Derry. After the outbreak of the conflict, the Irish Republican Clubs were established in America and Canada to support the Provisional Irish Republican Army (PIRA) cause. Much of the IRA support in Canada was based in Montreal, Toronto, and southern Ontario. Canadian IRA supporters raised money to secretly purchase weapons, most notably the detonators used in Canadian mining sites, for the IRA armed campaign.

At the same time, Irish Canadians also provided a role for loyalist paramilitaries (mostly the Ulster Volunteer Force and the Ulster Defence Association), owing to its considerable Ulster Protestant population in Ontario and Orange Lodges across the country. Sociologist Steve Bruce described the support networks in Canada as "the main source of support for loyalism outside the United Kingdom . . . Ontario is to Ulster Protestants what Boston is to Irish Catholics." After the Troubles began, various Canadian loyalist organisations sprang to life to provide the 'besieged' Protestants with the resources to arm themselves. Between 1979 and 1986, loyalist paramilitaries received 100 machine guns and many rifles, grenade launchers, magnum revolvers, and hundreds of thousands of rounds of ammunition from Canadian sources. These weapons were a boost to the loyalist armed campaign and contributed to the many numbers of Catholic civilian casualties.

==== Present ====
Today, the impact of the heavy 19th-century Irish immigration to Ontario is evident as those who report Irish extraction in the province number close to 2 million people or almost half the total Canadians who claim Irish ancestry. In 2004, March 17 was proclaimed "Irish Heritage Day" by the Ontario Legislature in recognition of the immense Irish contribution to the development of the Province.

Ontario sustains a network of Irish language enthusiasts, many of whom see the language as part of their ethnic heritage. Ontario is also home to Gaeltacht Bhuan Mheiriceá Thuaidh (the Permanent North American Gaeltacht), an area which hosts cultural activities for Irish speakers and learners and has been recognized by the Irish government.

With the downturn of Ireland's economy in 2010, many Irish people came to Canada looking for work, or to pre-arranged employment.

There are many communities in Ontario that are named after places and last names of Ireland, including Ballinafad, Ballyduff, Ballymote, Cavan, Connaught, Connellys, Dalton, Donnybrook, Dublin, Dundalk, Dunnville, Enniskillen, Erinsville, Galway, Hagarty, Irish Lake, Kearney, Keenansville, Kennedys, Killaloe, Killarney, Limerick, Listowel, Lucan, Maguire, Malone, McGarry, Moffat, Mullifarry, Munster, Navan, New Dublin, O'Connell, Oranmore, Quinn Settlement, Ripley, Shamrock, Tara, South Monaghan, Waterford and Westport.

=== New Brunswick ===
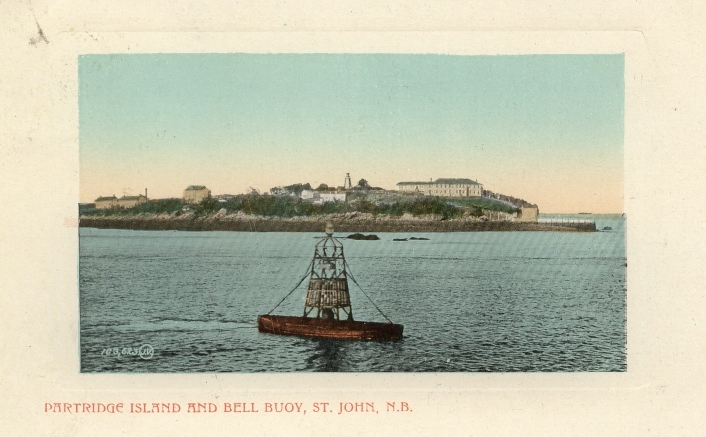
Partridge Island in Saint John Harbour

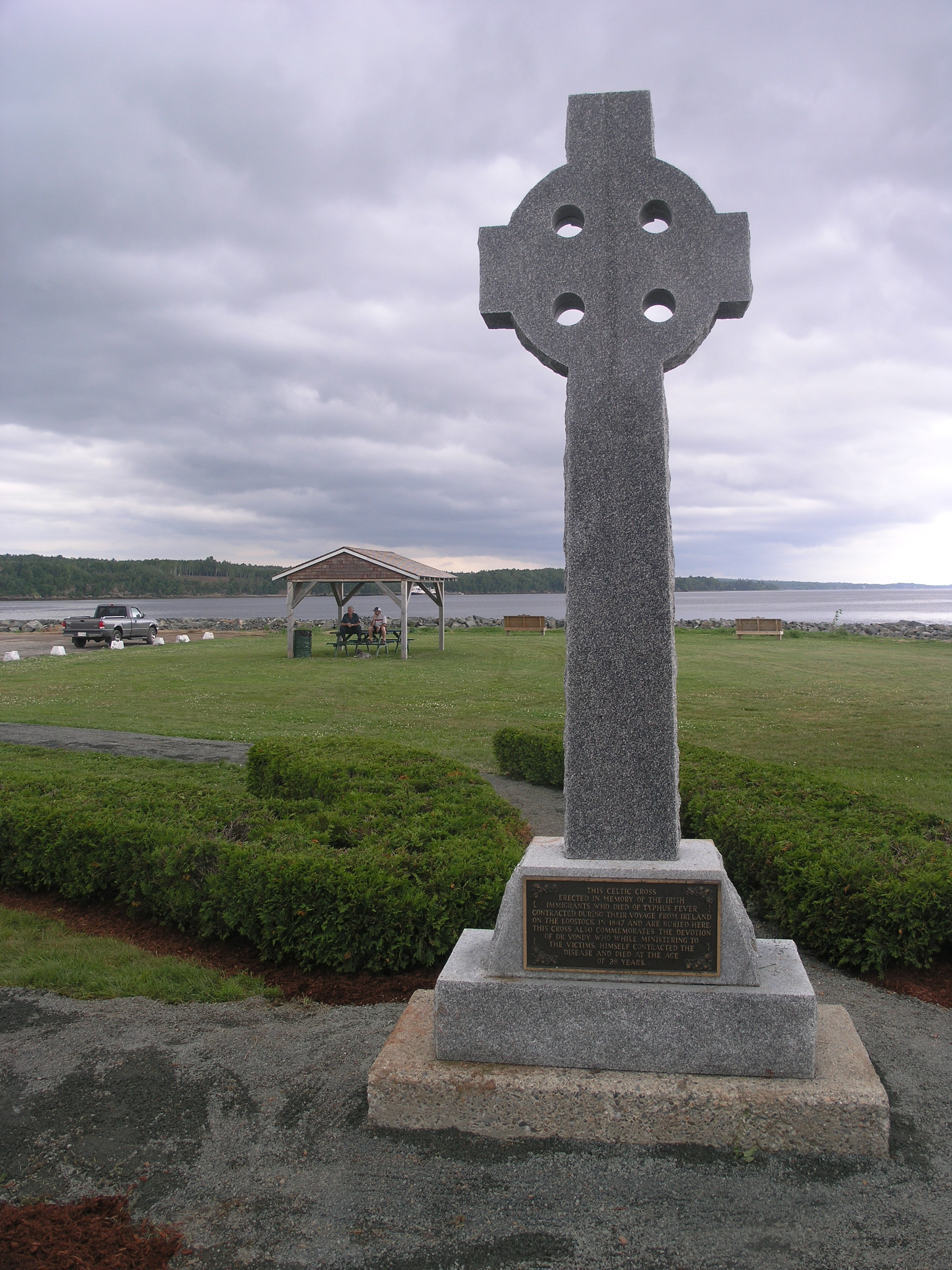
Irish Memorial on Middle Island, Miramichi, New Brunswick

Saint John has often been called "Canada's Irish City". In the years between 1815, when vast industrial changes began to disrupt the old life-styles in Europe, and Canadian Confederation in 1867, when immigration of that era passed its peak, more than 150,000 immigrants from Ireland arrived to Saint John. Those who came in the earlier period were largely tradesmen, and many stayed in Saint John, becoming the backbone of its builders. But when the Great Famine raged between 1845 and 1852, huge waves of Famine refugees arrived. It is estimated that between 1845 and 1847, some 30,000 arrived, more people than were living in the city at the time. In 1847, dubbed "Black 47", one of the worst years of the Famine, some 16,000 immigrants, most of them from Ireland, arrived at Partridge Island, the immigration and quarantine station at the mouth of Saint John Harbour.

After the partitioning of the British colony of Nova Scotia in 1784 New Brunswick was originally named New Ireland with the capital to be in Saint John.

By 1850, the Irish Catholic community constituted Saint John's largest ethnic group. In the census of 1851, over half the heads of households in the city registered themselves as natives of Ireland. By 1871, 55 per cent of Saint John's residents were Irish natives or children of Irish-born fathers. However, the city was split with tensions between Irish Catholics and Unionist Protestants. From the 1840s onward, Sectarian riots were rampant in the city with many poor, Irish-speaking immigrants clustered at York Point.

In 1967, at Reed's Point at the foot of Prince William Street, St. Patrick's Square was created to honour citizens of Irish heritage. The square overlooks Partridge Island, and a replica of the island's Celtic Cross stands in the square. Then in 1997 the park was refurbished by the city with a memorial marked by the city's St. Patrick's Society and Famine 150 which was unveiled by Hon. Mary Robinson, president of Ireland. The St. Patrick's Society of Saint John, founded in 1819, is still active today.

The Miramichi River valley, received a significant Irish immigration in the years before the famine. These settlers tended to be better off and better educated than the later arrivals, who came out of desperation. Though coming after the Scottish and the French Acadians, they made their way in this new land, intermarrying with the Catholic Highland Scots, and to a lesser extent, with the Acadians. Some, like Martin Cranney, held elective office and became the natural leaders of their augmented Irish community after the arrival of the famine immigrants. The early Irish came to the Miramichi because it was easy to get to with lumber ships stopping in Ireland before returning to Chatham and Newcastle, and because it provided economic opportunities, especially in the lumber industry. They were commonly Irish speakers, and in the eighteen thirties and eighteen forties there were many Irish-speaking communities along the New Brunswick and Maine frontier.

Long a timber-exporting colony, New Brunswick became the destination of thousands of Irish immigrants in the form of refugees fleeing the famines during the mid-19th century as the timber cargo vessels provided cheap passage when returning empty to the colony. Quarantine hospitals were located on islands at the mouth of the colony's two major ports, Saint John (Partridge Island) and Chatham-Newcastle (Middle Island), where many would ultimately die. Those who survived settled on marginal agricultural lands in the Miramichi River valley and in the Saint John River and Kennebecasis River valleys. The difficulty of farming these regions, however, saw many Irish immigrant families moving to the colony's major cities within a generation or to Portland, Maine or Boston.

Saint John and Chatham, New Brunswick saw large numbers of Irish migrants, changing the nature and character of both municipalities. Today, all of the amalgamated city of Miramichi continues to host a large annual Irish festival. Indeed, Miramichi is one of the most Irish communities in North America, second possibly only to Saint John or Boston.

As in Newfoundland, the Irish language survived as a community language in New Brunswick into the twentieth century. The 1901 census specifically enquired as to the mother tongue of the respondents, defining it as a language commonly spoken in the home. There were several individuals and a scattering of families in the census who described Irish as their first language and as being spoken at home. In other respects the respondents had less in common, some being Catholic and some Protestant.

=== Prince Edward Island ===
For years, Prince Edward Island had been divided between Irish Catholics and British Protestants (which included Ulster Scots from Northern Ireland). In the latter half of the 20th century, this sectarianism diminished and was ultimately destroyed recently after two events occurred. First, the Catholic and Protestant school boards were merged into one secular institution; second, the practice of electing two MLAs for each provincial riding (one Catholic and one Protestant) was ended.

==== History ====
According to professor emeritus, Brendan O'Grady, a history professor at the University of Prince Edward Island for fifty years, before the Great Famine of 1845–1852, in which a million Irish died and another million emigrated, the majority of Irish immigrants had already arrived on Prince Edward Island. One coffin ship landed on the Island in 1847.

The first waves of Irish immigrants took place between 1763 and 1880. when ten thousand Irish immigrants arrived on the Island. From 1800 to 1850, "10,000 immigrants from every county in Ireland" had settled in Prince Edward Island and represented 25% of the Island population by 1850.

The British divided St John's Island, following 1763, was divided into dozens of lots that were granted to "influential individuals in Britain" with conditions for land ownership including the settlement of each lot by 1787 by British Protestants.

From 1767 through 1810 English speaking Irish Protestants were brought to the colony as colonial pioneers to establish the British system of government with its institutions and laws. The Irish-born Captain Walter Patterson was the first governor of St John's Island from 1769 until he was removed from office by Whitehall in 1787. According to the Dictionary of Canadian Biography, what became known as the century-long "land question", originated with Patterson's failure as administrator of a colony whose lands were owned by a monopoly of British absentee proprietors who demanded rent from their Island tenants.

In May 1830 the first ship of families from County Monaghan, in the province of Ulster, Ireland accompanied by Father John MacDonald who had recruited them, arrived on the Island to settle in Fort Augustus, on the lots inherited by Father John MacDonald from his father Captain John MacDonald. From the 1830s through 1848, 3,000 people emigrated from County Monaghan to PEI in what became known as the Monaghan settlements, forming the largest group of Irish to arrive on the Island in the first half of the 19th century.

=== Newfoundland ===
Newfoundland Tricolour

Official flag of the Republic of Ireland

The large Irish Catholic element in Newfoundland in the 19th century played a major role in Newfoundland history, and developed a strong local culture of their own. They were in repeated political conflict—sometimes violent—with the Protestant Scots-Irish "Orange" element.

In 1806, The Benevolent Irish Society (BIS) was founded as a philanthropic organization in St. John's, Newfoundland for locals of Irish birth or ancestry, regardless of religious persuasion. The BIS was founded as a charitable, fraternal, middle-class social organization, on the principles of "benevolence and philanthropy", and had as its original objective to provide the necessary skills which would enable the poor to better themselves. Today the society is still active in Newfoundland and is the oldest philanthropic organization in North America.

Newfoundland Irish Catholics, mainly from the southeast of Ireland, settled in the cities (mainly St. John's and parts of the surrounding Avalon Peninsula), while British Protestants, mainly from the West Country, settled in small fishing communities. Over time, the Irish Catholics became wealthier than their Protestant neighbours, which gave incentive for Protestant Newfoundlanders to join the Orange Order. In 1903, Sir William Coaker founded the Fisherman's Protective Union in an Orange Hall in Herring Neck. Furthermore, during the term of Commission of Government (1934–1949), the Orange Lodge was one of only a handful of "democratic" organizations that existed in the Dominion of Newfoundland. In 1948, a referendum was held in Newfoundland as to its political future; the Irish Catholics mainly supported a return to independence for Newfoundland as it existed before 1934, while the Protestants mainly supported joining the Canadian Confederation. Newfoundland then joined Canada by a 52–48% margin, and with an influx of Protestants into St. John's after the closure of the east coast cod fishery in the 1990s, the main issues have become one of Rural vs. Urban interests rather than anything ethnic or religious.

To Newfoundland, the Irish gave the still-familiar family names of southeast Ireland: Walsh, Power, Murphy, Ryan, Whelan, Phelan, O'Brien, Kelly, Hanlon, Neville, Bambrick, Halley, Houlihan, Hogan, Dillon, Byrne, Quigley, Burke, and FitzGerald. Irish place names are less common, many of the island's more prominent landmarks having already been named by early French and English explorers. Nevertheless, Newfoundland's Ballyhack, Cappahayden, Kilbride, St. Bride's, Port Kirwan, Waterford Valley, Windgap and Skibereen all point to Irish antecedents.

Along with traditional names, the Irish brought their native tongue. Newfoundland is the only place outside Europe with its own distinctive name in the Irish language, Talamh an Éisc, "the land of fish". Eastern Newfoundland was one of the few places outside Ireland where the Irish language was spoken by a majority of the population as their primary language. Newfoundland Irish was of Munster derivation and was still in use by older people into the first half of the twentieth century. It has influenced Newfoundland English both lexically (in words like angishore and sleveen) and grammatically (the after past-tense construction, for instance).

The family names, the features and colouring, the predominant Catholic religion, the prevalence of Irish music – even the dialect and accent of the people – are so reminiscent of rural Ireland that Irish author Tim Pat Coogan has described Newfoundland as "the most Irish place in the world outside of Ireland".

The United Irish Uprising occurred during April 1800, in St. John's, Newfoundland where up to 400 Irishmen had taken the secret oath of the Society of the United Irishmen. The Colony of Newfoundland rebellion was the only one to occur which the British administration linked directly to the Irish Rebellion of 1798. The uprising in St. John's was significant in that it was the first occasion on which the Irish in Newfoundland deliberately challenged the authority of the state, and because the British feared that it might not be the last. It earned for Newfoundland a reputation as a Transatlantic Tipperary–a far-flung but semi-Irish colony with the potential for political chaos. Seven Irishman were hanged by the crown because of the uprising.

According to the 2001 Canadian census, the largest ethnic group in Newfoundland and Labrador is English (39.4%), followed by Irish (39.7%), Scottish (6.0%), French (5.5%), and First Nations (3.2%). While half of all respondents also identified their ethnicity as "Canadian", 38% report their ethnicity as "Newfoundlander" in a 2003 Statistics Canada Ethnic Diversity Survey.

Accordingly, the largest single religious denomination by number of adherents according to the 2001 census was the Roman Catholic Church, at 36.9% of the province's population (187,405 members). The major Protestant denominations make up 59.7% of the population, with the largest group being the Anglican Church of Canada at 26.1% of the total population (132,680 members), the United Church of Canada at 17.0% (86,420 members), and the Salvation Army at 7.9% (39,955 members), with other Protestant denominations in much smaller numbers. The Pentecostal Church made up 6.7% of the population with 33,840 members. Non-Christians made up only 2.7% of the total population, with the majority of those respondents indicating "no religion" (2.5% of the total population).

According to the Statistics Canada 2006 census, 21.5% of Newfoundlanders claim Irish ancestry (other major groups in the province include 43.2% English, 7% Scottish, and 6.1% French). In 2006, Statistics Canada have listed the following ethnic origins in Newfoundland; 216,340 English, 107,390 Irish, 34,920 Scottish, 30,545 French, 23,940 North American Indian etc.

Most of the Irish migration to Newfoundland was pre-famine (late 18th century and early 19th century), and two centuries of isolation have led many of Irish descent in Newfoundland to consider their ethnic identity "Newfoundlander", and not "Irish", although they are aware of the cultural links between the two.

=== Nova Scotia ===
About one Nova Scotian in four is of Irish descent, and there are good tracing facilities for genealogists and family historians.

Many Nova Scotians who claim Irish ancestry are of Presbyterian Ulster-Scottish descent. William Sommerville (1800–1878) was ordained in the Irish Reformed Presbyterian Church and in 1831 was sent as a missionary to New Brunswick. There, with missionary Alexander Clarke, he formed the Reformed Presbytery of New Brunswick and Nova Scotia in 1832 before becoming minister of the West Cornwallis congregation in Grafton, Nova Scotia, in 1833. Although a strict Covenanter, Sommerville initially ministered to Presbyterians generally over a very extensive district. Presbyterian centres included Colchester County, Nova Scotia.

Catholic Irish settlement in Nova Scotia was traditionally restricted to the urban Halifax area. Halifax, founded in 1749, was estimated to be about 16% Irish Catholic in 1767 and about 9% by the end of the 18th century. Although the harsh laws enacted against them were generally not enforced, Irish Catholics had no legal rights in the early history of the city. Catholic membership in the legislature was nonexistent until near the end of the century. In 1829 Lawrence O'Connor Doyle, of Irish parentage, became the first of his faith to become a lawyer and helped to overcome opposition to the Irish.

There were also rural Irish village settlements throughout most of Guysborough County, such as the Erinville (meaning Irishville) /Salmon River Lake/Ogden/Bantry district (Bantry being named after Bantry Bay, County Cork, Ireland but abandoned since the 19th century for better farmland in places like Erinville/Salmon River Lake). In this area Irish last names are prevalent and an Irish influence is apparent in the accent, the traditional music of the area, food, religion (Roman Catholic) and lingering traces of the Irish language. In Antigonish County there are other villages of Irish provenance, and still others can be found on Cape Breton Island, in places such as New Waterford, Rocky Bay and Glace Bay.

Murdoch (1998) notes that the popular image of Cape Breton Island as a last bastion of Scottish Highland and specifically Gaelic culture distorts the complex history of the island since the 16th century. The original Mi'kmaq inhabitants, Acadian French, Lowland Scots, Irish, Loyalists from New England, and English have all contributed to a history which has included cultural, religious, and political conflict as well as cooperation and synthesis. The Highland Scots became the largest community in the early 19th century, and their heritage has survived in diminished form.

=== Prairies ===
While some influential Canadian politicians anticipated that the assisted migrations of Irish settlers would lead to the establishment of a 'New Ireland' on Canada's prairies, or at least raise the profile of the country's potential as a suitable destination for immigrants, neither happened. Sheppard (1990) looks at the efforts in the 1880s of Quaker philanthropist James Hack Tuke as well as those of Thomas Connolly, the Irish emigration agent for the Canadian government. The Irish press continued to warn potential emigrants of the dangers and hardships of life in Canada and encouraged would-be emigrants to settle instead in the United States.

Irish migration to the Prairie Provinces had two distinct components: those who came via eastern Canada or the United States, and those who came directly from Ireland. Many of the Irish-Canadians who came west were fairly well assimilated, in that they spoke English and understood British customs and law, and tended to be regarded as a part of English Canada. However, this picture was complicated by the religious division. Many of the original "English" Canadian settlers in the Red River Colony were fervent Irish Loyalist Protestants, and members of the Orange Order. They clashed with Catholic Métis leader Louis Riel's provisional government during the Red River Rebellion, and as a result Thomas Scott was executed, inflaming sectarian tensions in the east. At this time and during the course of the following decades, many of the Catholic Irish were fighting for separate Catholic schools in the west, but sometimes clashed with the Francophone element of the Catholic community during the Manitoba Schools Question. After World War I and the de facto resolution of the religious schools issue, any eastern Irish-Canadians moving west blended in totally with the majority society. The small group of Irish-born who arrived in the second half of the 20th century tended to be urban professionals, a stark contrast to the agrarian pioneers who had come before.

About 10% of the population of Saskatchewan during 1850–1930 were Irish-born or of Irish origin. Cottrell (1999) examines the social, economic, political, religious, and ideological impact of the Irish diaspora on pioneer society and suggests that both individually and collectively, the Irish were a relatively privileged group. The most visible manifestations of intergenerational Irish ethnicity – the Catholic Church and the Orange Order – served as vehicles for recreating Irish culture on the prairies and as forums for ethnic fusion, which integrated people of Irish origin with settlers of other nationalities. The Irish were thus a vital force for cohesion in an ethnically diverse frontier society, but also a source of major tension with elements that did not share their vision of how the province of Saskatchewan should evolve.

== See also ==
- British Canadians
- Canada–Ireland relations
- Irish Montreal before the Great Famine
- List of Ireland-related topics

- Irish diaspora
- Irish Americans
- Irish Australians
- Irish (ethnicity)

- Coat of Arms of Canada
