= Irish Montreal before the Great Famine =

Since the founding of Montreal in 1642, there has been a strong Irish presence in the city. The earlier Irish immigrants gradually assimilated into Montreal society. Irish people arrived in greater numbers as a result of the Great Irish Famine of 1845–49, and although these encountered considerable hostility, many people of Irish descent have continued to live in Montreal.

== Irish immigration to Canada ==
The first Irish Canadians were settlers sent by France in the 17th century to colonize the Saint Lawrence Valley. Since that time, the Irish have always held a strong presence in Canadian society. Today there are approximately 5,000,000 Irish Canadians, making up about 15% of the population of Canada.

== New France and Montreal ==
At the beginning of the eighteenth century there were around 100 Irish families living in New France. While they were not the majority, many of the families had little difficulty assimilating into French-Canadian society and culture. Many of these Irish families migrated to Montreal. Because of its geographic placement, downstream in the Saint Lawrence River, Montreal quickly became one of the biggest centres of trade in New France.

== Montreal, 1800–1847 ==
By the beginning of the 19th century, commercial shipping between Canada, Britain and Ireland, caused a large wave of emigration to Canada beginning in 1815. Many of the Irish who landed in Montreal regarded Lower Canada as a stepping stone towards English speaking Upper Canada and the United States. By 1825, out of its total population of 25,000, Montreal had an Irish population of about 3,000 people, who lived mainly in the western area of the city. This Irish population was very involved in Montreal's political, social, religious, and journalist spheres. Catholics and Protestants began to associate with each other as Irish-Canadians, bonding over their common heritage, language, customs, and celebrations. While Protestants found it difficult to interact with French-Catholic Montreal, the Irish Catholics played an important bridging the gap between the groups. The relationship between the Irish and the French populations in Montreal during the 1830s was reasonably stable. It was with the Great Irish Famine that more than 250,000 Irish immigrants landed in Canada. With this large influx came great animosity directed towards the Irish in Montreal and throughout the rest of Quebec, Canada and the United States. Many Irish people nevertheless remained in Montreal, and today there are around 162,000 people in the city who declare their Irish heritage.

== See also ==
- Irish Quebecers
- Griffintown
- Little Dublin, Montreal
