= Murder of Mary Gallagher =

1879 murder in Quebec, Canada

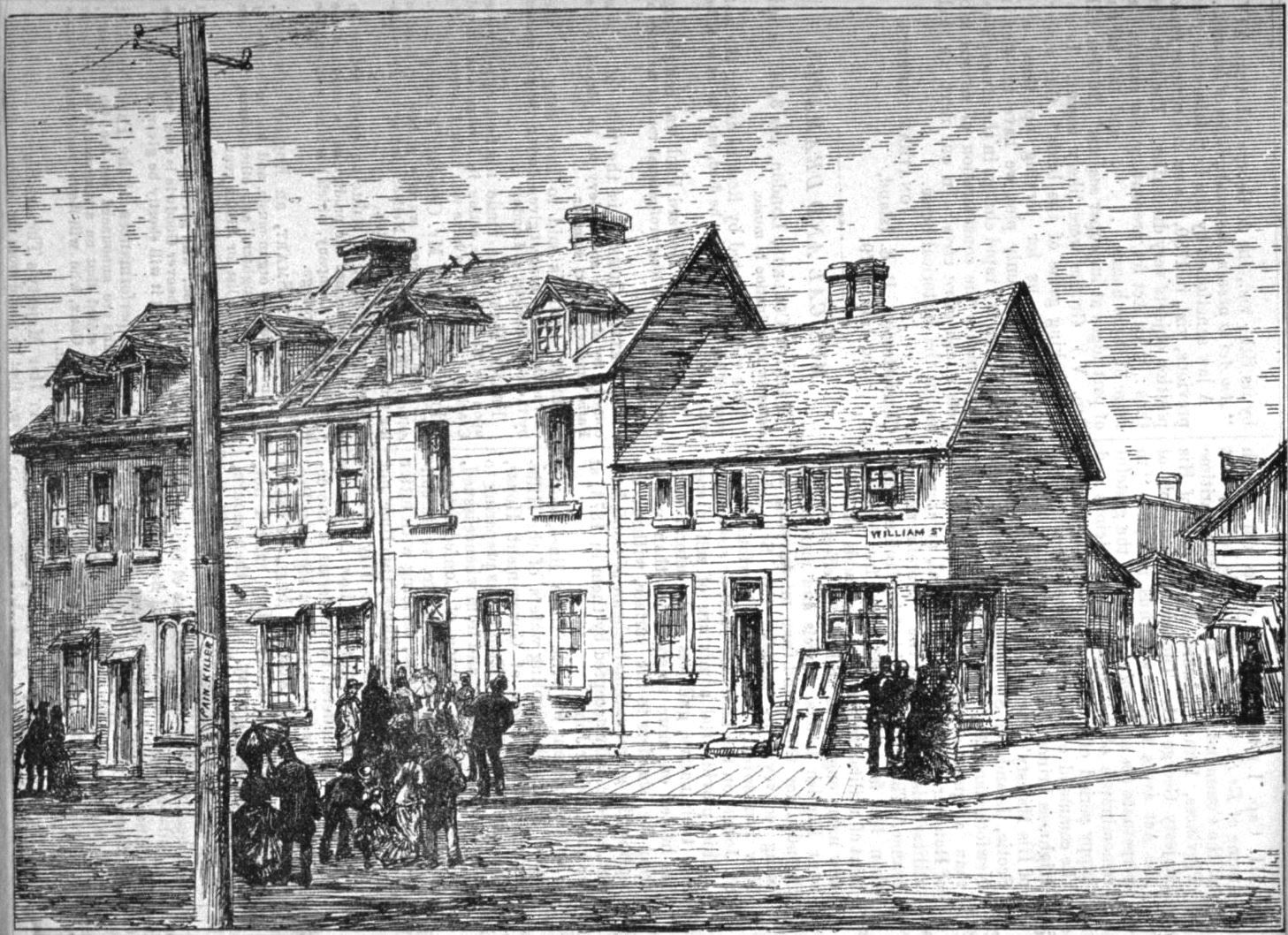
Scene of the Gallagher murder

Mary Gallagher was a 19th-century Irish-Canadian woman who was murdered in the then-Irish dominant neighbourhood of Griffintown, Montreal, Quebec. Allegedly a sex worker, Gallagher was killed via decapitation on 27 June 1879. Since her murder, she has been the subject of significant folklore, with some claiming that her spirit haunts the area to the present day.
