= Griffintown Horse Palace =

Horse stable in Montreal, Quebec, Canada

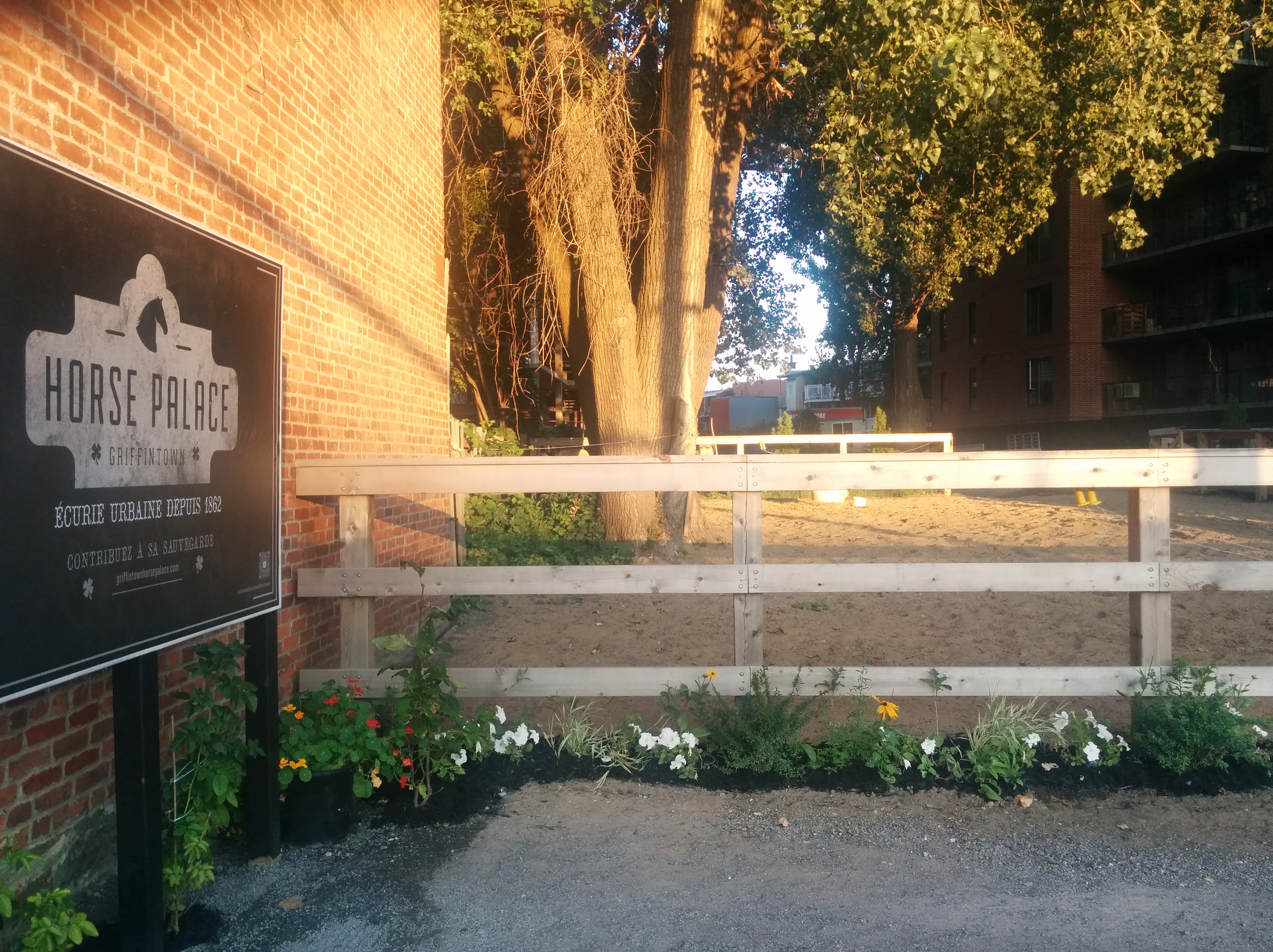
- Established: 1862
- Location: 1220-1226, Ottawa Street, Griffintown district in Montreal, Quebec, Canada,
- Coordinates: 45.493537°N 73.560449°W
- Website: Foundation website

The Griffintown Horse Palace is a stable in the Griffintown district in Montreal, Quebec, Canada, which dates back to around 1860. For three decades, the stables were run by former Goose Village resident, iceman and calèche driver Leo Leonard, also known locally as Clawhammer Jack. Leonard, who was reported to be the last Irish Quebecer left in Griffintown, retired and moved to Nun's Island in 2011. The sale of his land around his Ottawa Street residence has cast the future of the stables in doubt. Leo and his stables are featured in an episode of Weird Houses (Home on the Range, 1999, season 4 episode 26). Montreal landscape architect Juliette Patterson has formed a foundation in an attempt to save the Horse Palace, which has also drawn support from the area's historic Irish community.

Though the stables are considered to have cultural heritage value by the City of Montreal, they are not a protected heritage site by the Province of Quebec. Patterson and her foundation would like to preserve the Horse Palace as a working stable for caleche horses serving nearby Old Montreal as well as a museum of 19th-century Montreal history. But the foundation has been unable as of December 2011 to raise enough money to purchase Leonard's land and buildings, which are now valued at over $1 million. The horse palace site includes the stables, a vacant 3,500-square foot lot, the Leonards' brick triplex and an aging former auberge, and is being sold in three separate lots.

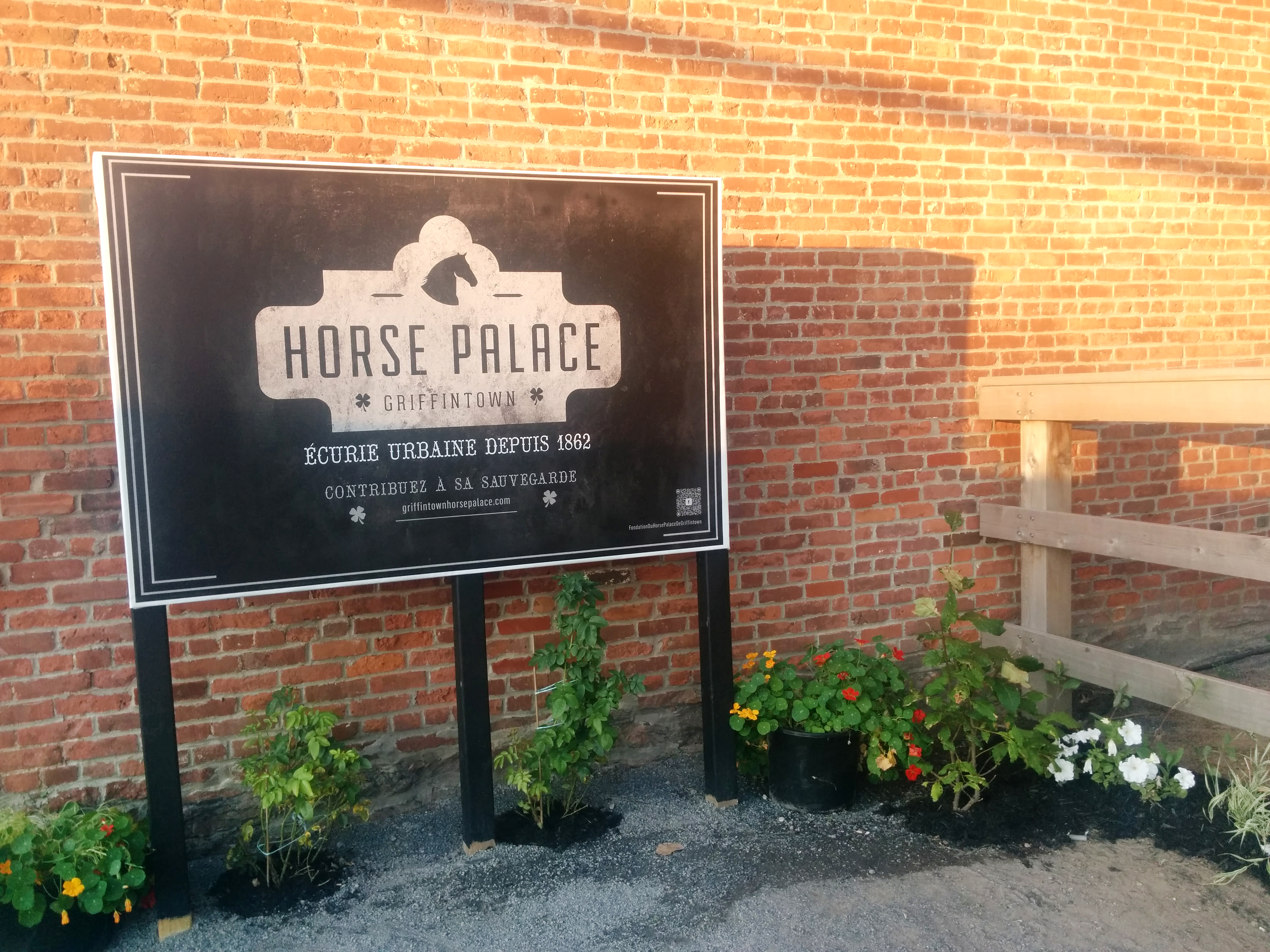
Efforts are being made to preserve the historical Griffintown Horse Palace.
