= Griffintown =

- Neighbourhood
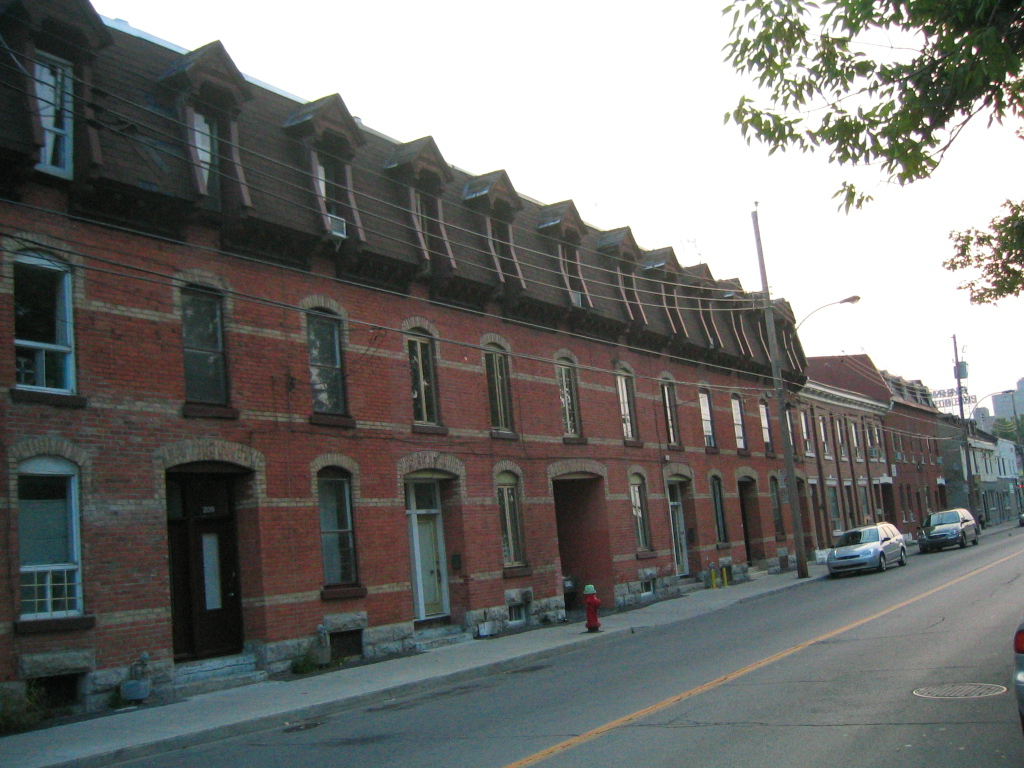
- Mountain Street in Griffintown

- Location of Griffintown in Montreal
- Coordinates: 45.48756°N 73.56677°W
- Country: Canada
- Province: Quebec
- City: Montreal
- Borough: Le Sud-Ouest

Area
  - Land: 1.31 km^{2} (0.51 sq mi)
- Elevation: 20 m (66 ft)

Population (2011)
  - Total: 6,446
  - Density: 4,920.6/km^{2} (12,744/sq mi)
  - Change (2006-11): ▲67.3%
  - Dwellings: 4,714
- Postal Code: H3C
- Area codes: 514, 438

Griffintown is a historic neighbourhood of Montreal, Quebec, southwest of downtown. The area existed as a functional neighbourhood from the 1820s until the 1960s and was mainly populated by Irish immigrants and their descendants. Mostly depopulated since then, the neighbourhood has been undergoing redevelopment since the early 2010s.

Griffintown is the portion of the ward of St. Ann north of the Lachine Canal; the part south of the canal is now part of Pointe-Saint-Charles. This part of the ward was delimited by Notre-Dame Street to the north, the Bonaventure Expressway to the east, and a short segment of the city limit between Notre-Dame Street and the canal west of the St. Gabriel Locks to the west. It was the earliest and largest faubourg annexed to Old Montreal before the introduction of the tram car in the 1840s.

== Etymology ==
The name Griffintown was derived from Mary Griffin. Griffin illegally obtained the lease to the land from a business associate of Thomas McCord in 1799. She then commissioned land surveyor Louis Charland to subdivide the land and plan streets for the area in 1804. Griffin's husband, Robert, owned a soap factory in the area and went on to become the first clerk of the Bank of Montreal upon its formation in 1817.

== History ==
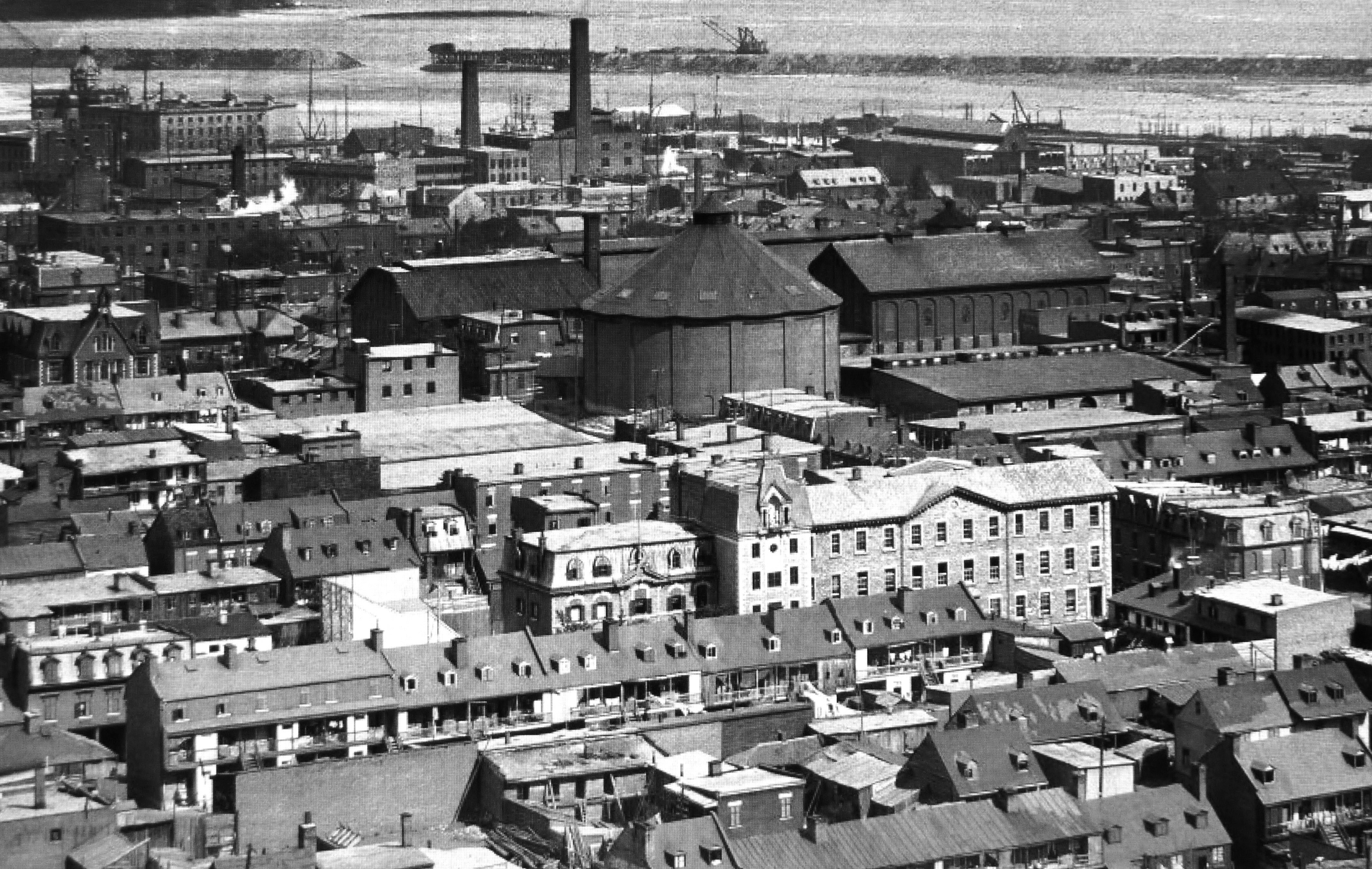
Griffintown in 1896.

Griffintown was first populated in the early nineteenth century mostly by Irish immigrant labourers. They worked on the Lachine Canal and in the industries surrounding it, the Victoria Bridge, railways, and the Port of Montreal.

The Irish community was centered on St. Ann's Catholic Church, which opened in 1854 at the corner of McCord (now Mountain Street) and Basin Streets, across from Gallery Square, which was named after the Gallery brothers, John Daniel Gallery, who ran a large and successful bakery and his brother Daniel Gallery who was an alderman of Montreal, Schools commissioner and a Liberal member of parliament.

By the early twentieth century, the Irish were being replaced by Jewish, Italian, Ukrainian, and Francophone communities, with the Irish becoming a minority group by 1941.

The Canadian National Railway elevated tracks approaching Montreal Central Station cut a wide swathe between Dalhousie and Nazareth Streets around 1930.

Post-war economic changes beginning in the 1950s led to the depopulation of "The Griff". The Lachine Canal lost its role as a major transport artery when it was replaced by the Saint Lawrence Seaway in 1959.

In 1962, Griffintown was re-zoned as "light industrial". Many buildings were demolished in the 1960s to make way for the Bonaventure Expressway and for parking lots.

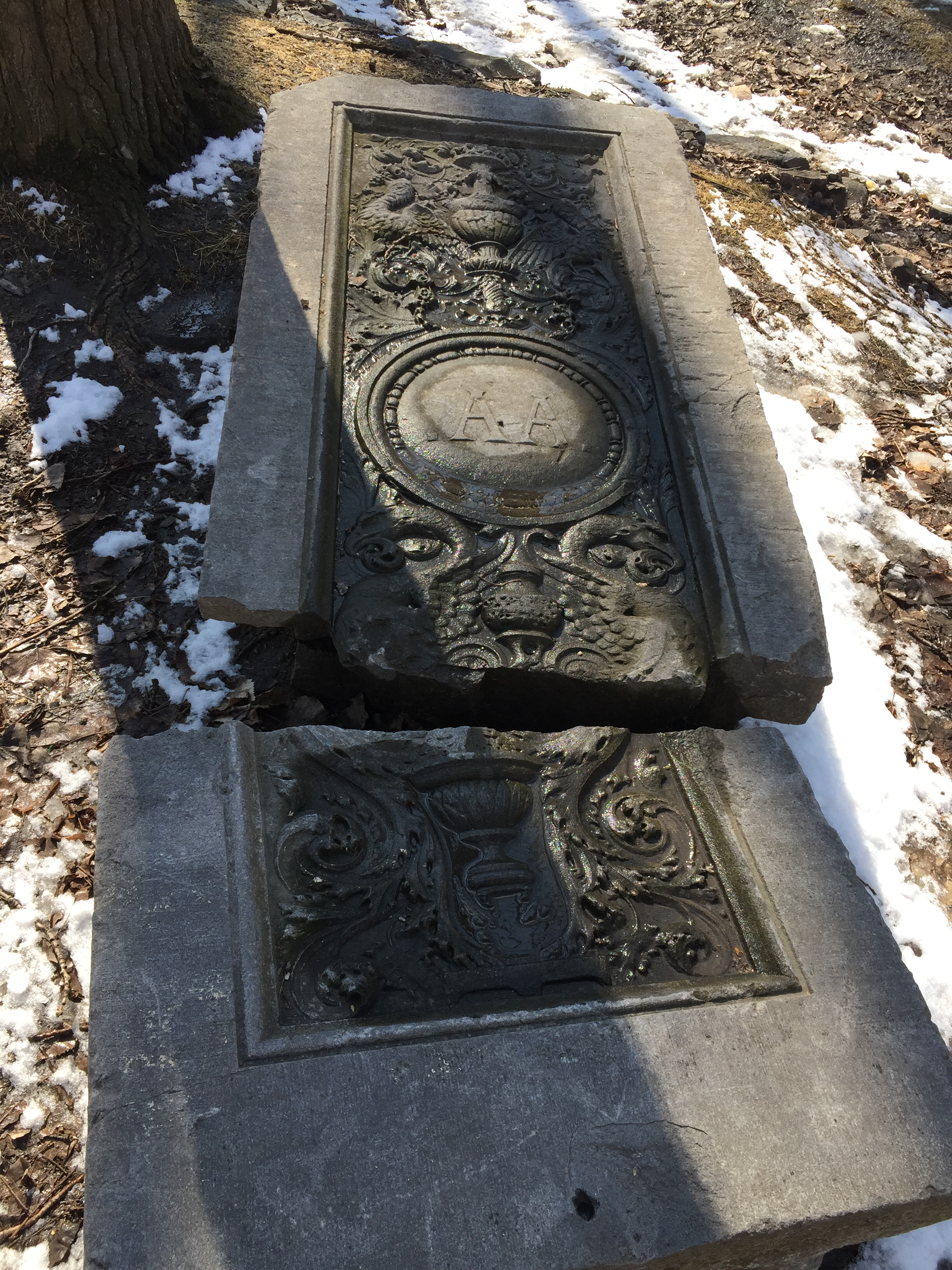
Ruins of St Ann's, today an outdoor museum and park.

St. Ann's Church was demolished in 1970, and is now the site of the Parc Griffintown-St-Ann, where parts of the church's foundations remain visible, and park benches are positioned where the pews would have been. By 1974, the population of Griffintown was 546.

In 1990, the eastern part of the area was included in the planning sector of "Faubourg des Récollets". By then it only somewhat resembled the historic neighbourhood due to the lack of remaining historical architecture. The Cité Multimédia was built partly above the ruins. The remainders are preserved in the McCord Museum.

In 2014, Griffintown became part of an ongoing movement to introduce a "Quartier de l'innovation" to lower Montreal. This area would look to foster creativity and entrepreneurship in the city, designed to promote and encourage economic development for district residents.

== Redevelopment ==
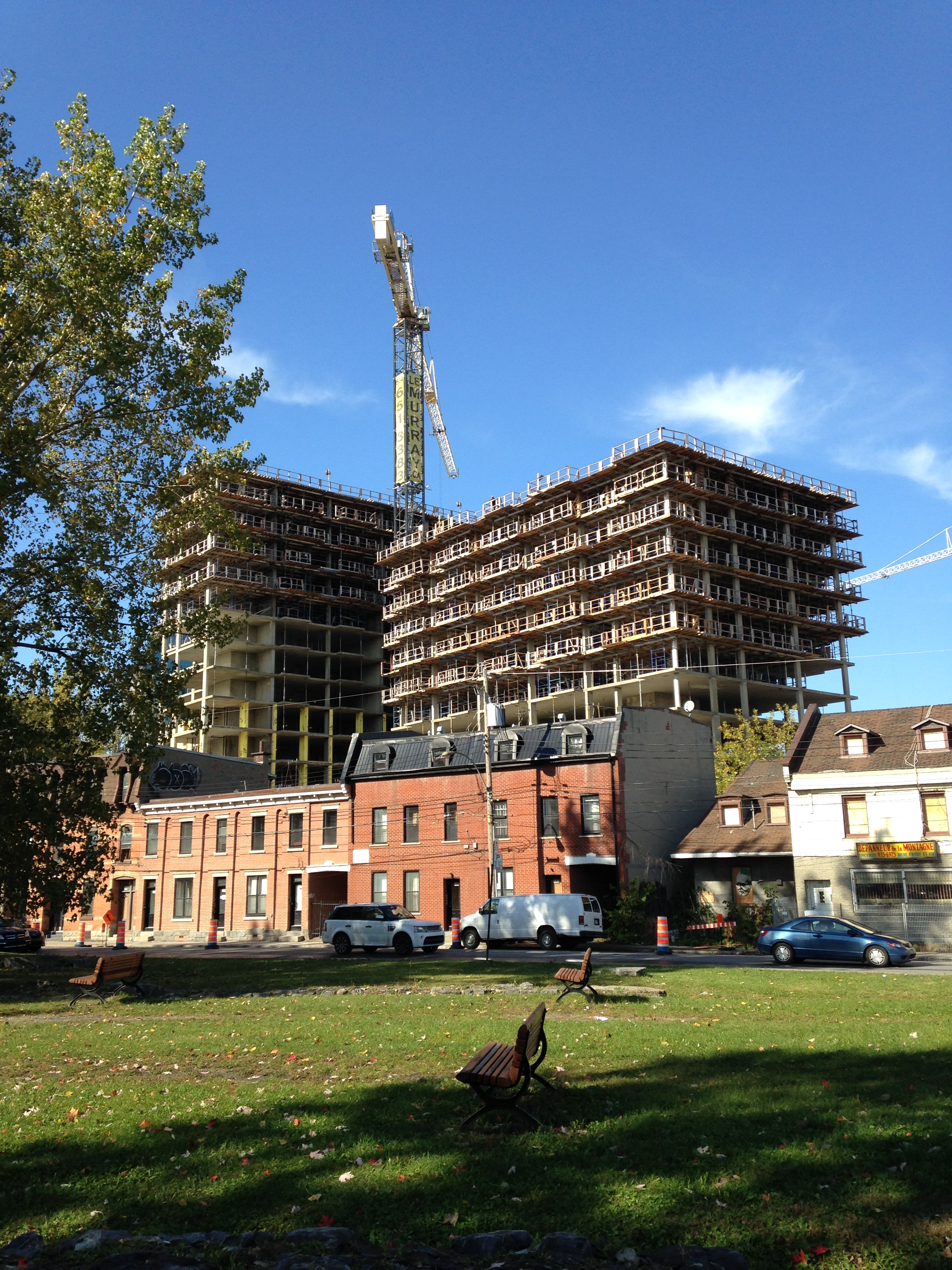
Condominiums under construction in October 2014.

In October 2012, the city of Montreal revealed its plans concerning the redevelopment of the Griffintown area, with a desire to transform what was then an industrial, sparsely inhabited area into a pleasant, high-density neighborhood. In order to do this, the city announced plans to establish parks and bike paths and to provide permits for the building of dozens of condominium towers in the area, ranging from 10 to 20 stories high.

Another stated goal of the project was to preserve the historical significance of some of the remaining century-old buildings.

The Griffintown redevelopment is expected to be completed by 2025.

== Administrative status ==
The entire area currently considered to be Griffintown is located within the borough of Le Sud-Ouest, although the western end of the historic district extends into the borough of Ville-Marie. Griffintown spans theoretically from the neighbourhood of Point St. Charles to the Old Port, and north to Notre-Dame Street. Currently, it holds the stables (the Griffintown Horse Palace, at the corner of Ottawa and Eleanor) for the horses that provide tours in carriages (calèche) around the Old Port. Many technological companies built office space in the area, and École de Technologie Supérieure (ÉTS) built its residence there. Very few residents still live in the area, and very little of the original architecture remains, however. Because of its location, some residential projects are taking shape, including Lowney Lofts, a multi-phase condominium project revitalizing a chocolate factory and the surrounding block.

In 2006, a project to move the Montreal Casino to the Peel Basin, as part of an entertainment complex in partnership with the Cirque du Soleil, caused a controversy because of the social impact of the establishment of gambling in an underprivileged district. The project was finally abandoned. In July 2007, promoter Devimco announced plans to develop 12 hectares of the neighborhood into a modern complex of office towers and residential homes.

On the City of Montreal Website, additional plans to update the now-renamed Griffintown are described.

== Culture ==
Michel Régnier made a film on the subject in 1972, which used archival photos of Griffintown, along with interviews of former residents in order to paint a picture of the landscape, community, and a people. Richard Burman made a documentary in 2003 called 'Ghosts of Griffintown'. It starts off telling the story of Ms Mary Gallagher, a prostitute who was brutally murdered in 1879 and would return every seven years to William Street in search of her head. Although the last reported sighting was in 1928, Mary Gallagher Day is on June 27 (the date of the sightings), every seven years. It then explores the history using this story as a metaphor on how the community itself has disappeared like a ghost. Alan Hustak has written a book 'The Ghost of Griffintown' which explores in great detail the murder of Mary Gallagher. Lisa Gasior created the Griffinsound Project that is a walking tour designed to be completed individually. It provides a background and interviews regarding the changing landscape of this space.

== Demographics ==
Knowledge of official languages (2021)
Language	Population	Pct (%)
French	865	8.2%
English	1,455	13.9%
Both English and French	8,050	76.6%
Other languages	145	1.4%

Home languages (2021)
Language	Population	Pct (%)
French	5,060	48.1%
English	3,305	31.4%
Other languages	1,420	13.5%
Multiple languages	745	7.1%

== See also ==
- Goose Village, Montreal
- Irish Montreal before the Great Famine
- Little Dublin, Montreal
- Murder of Mary Gallagher
