= Little Dublin =

Irish middle class neighbourhood

Little Dublin was an Irish middle class neighbourhood in central Montreal, near St. Patrick’s Basilica. Although the area was overtaken by warehouses and then office blocks in the 20th century, some row houses still exist. It occupied the area between today’s Downtown Montreal, Old Montreal and Chinatown.
