= List of television theme music =

The following list contains scores or songs which are the primary theme music of a television series or miniseries. They are sorted alphabetically by the television series' title. Any themes, scores, or songs which are billed under a different name than their respective television series' title are shown in parentheses, except in cases where they are officially billed as "Theme from [Series' Name]", "[Series' Name] Theme", etc., which are omitted. This list does not include television series whose broadcast run was less than ten episodes (i.e. a "failed" series) unless officially designated as a television miniseries. In cases where more than one piece of music was used for the main theme during the broadcast run of a television series (Baywatch, Happy Days, Starsky & Hutch, for example), only the most widely recognized score is listed.

== 0 – 9 ==
- 100 Things To Do Before High School ("Brand New Day") – Isabela Moner
- 12 O'Clock High - Dominic Frontiere
- 13 Queens Boulevard - Barry De Vorzon
- 2 Broke Girls ("Second Chance") - Peter Bjorn and John
- 2Point4Children - Howard Goodall
- 2000 Malibu Road – James Newton Howard
- 21 Jump Street – composed by Liam Sternberg; performed by Holly Robinson
- 227 ("There's No Place Like Home") – Ray Colcord, performed by Marla Gibbs
- 24 – Sean Callery
- 240-Robert – Mike Post and Pete Carpenter
- 3-2-1 Contact – Tom Anthony
- 3-2-1 Penguins! ("3–2–1 Penguins! Theme Song") – Kurt Heinecke
- 30 Rock – Jeff Richmond
- The 4400 ("A Place in Time") – Amanda Abizaid
- 48 Hours – Edd Kalehoff
- 64 Zoo Lane – Rowland Lee
- 6teen – Don Breithaupt
- The 7D – Parry Gripp
- 7th Heaven – Steve Plunkett
- 77 Sunset Strip – Mack David and Jerry Livingston
- 8 Simple Rules – Dan Foliart
- 9 to 5 ("9 to 5 (Dolly Parton song)") – Phoebe Snow (1982–83); Dolly Parton

== A – B ==
- A.E.S. Hudson Street – Jack Elliott and Allyn Ferguson
- A.N.T. Farm ("Exceptional") – China Anne McClain
- Abby Hatcher – Ryan Carlson, Summer Weiler, Hanna Ashbrook and Chris Sernel, performed by Macy Drouin
- Absolutely Fabulous ("This Wheel's on Fire") – Bob Dylan and Rick Danko (performed by Julie Driscoll, Ade Edmondson and Debbie Harry)
- ABC Olympic broadcasts ("Bugler's Dream") - Leo Arnaud
- Ace of Wands ("Tarot") – Andrew Bown
- Adam-12 – Frank Comstock
- Accidental Family – Earle Hagen
- Action ("Even a Dog Can Shake Hands") – Warren Zevon
- Adam's Rib ("Two People") – Perry Botkin Jr. and Gil Garfield
- The Addams Family ("The Addams Family Theme") – Vic Mizzy
- Adderly - Micky Erbe and Maribeth Solomon
- The Adventurer – John Barry
- The Adventures of Black Beauty ("Galloping Home") – Denis King
- Adventures from the Book of Virtues ("The Adventures Has Begun") – J. A. C. Redford and Marcus Hummon
- The Adventures of Brisco County, Jr. – Randy Edelman
- Adventures of the Gummi Bears ("Gummi Bears Theme") – Michael and Patty Silversher
- The Adventures of Jimmy Neutron, Boy Genius – Brian Causey
- The Adventures of Pete & Pete ("Hey Sandy") – Polaris
- The Adventures of Rin Tin Tin – Stanley Keyana
- Adventures of Superman – Leon Klatzkin
- The Adventures of William Tell – Gioachino Rossini, lyrics were added by Harold Purcell and were sung by David Whitfield.
- Adventure Time ("Island Song") – Ashley Eriksson
- AEW Dynamite ("Jane") – Jefferson Starship
- After Henry (Three Quarter Blues") – George Gershwin
- Agatha Christie's Poirot – Christopher Gunning
- Agony ("Dear Jane") – Graham Field, performed by Babs Fletcher
- Airwolf – Sylvester Levay
- AKBingo! (Aitakatta) – Yasushi Akimoto & Bounceback; Performed by AKB48
- ALF – Alf Clausen and Tom Kramer
- Alfred Hitchcock Presents ("Funeral March of a Marionette") – Charles Gounod
- Alfresco – David McNiven
- Alias Smith and Jones – Billy Goldenberg
- Alice ("There's a New Girl in Town") – (music by David Shire) (lyrics by Alan and Marilyn Bergman) (sung by Linda Lavin)
- Alien Nation – Kenneth Johnson and David Kurtz
- Aliens in the Family – Todd Rundgren
- All at No. 20 – Denis King
- All Creatures Great and Small – ("Piano Parchment") by Johnny Pearson
- Allegra's Window – Dan Sawyer
- All Grown Up! ("All Grown Up with You") – Cree Summer
- All in Good Faith – Ronnie Hazlehurst
- All in the Family ("Those Were the Days") – Lee Adams and Charles Strouse (performed by Carroll O'Connor and Jean Stapleton); closing theme ("Remembering You") by Roger Kellaway and Carroll O'Connor
- All That - TLC
- All That Glitters ("Genesis") – Kenny Rankin
- 'Allo, 'Allo! – David Croft and Roy Moore
- Allsång på Skansen (Sing-along at Skansen, Sveriges Television) ("Stockholm i mitt hjärta" translation: "Stockholm In My Heart") – Lasse Berghagen
- Ally McBeal ("Searchin' My Soul") – Vonda Shepard
- Almost Home – Jennifer Warnes and Joey Scarbury
- Aloha Paradise – Steve Lawrence
- Alvin and the Chipmunks ("We're The Chipmunks") – Ross Bagdasarian and Janice Karman
- Alvinnn!!! and the Chipmunks ("We're the Chipmunks") – Ross Bagdasarian and Janice Karman
- The Alvin Show – Ross Bagdasarian, Neal Hefti and Carl W. Stalling
- The Amazing Chan and the Chan Clan – Hoyt Curtin
- The Amazing Race – John M. Keane
- The Amazing Spider-Man – Stu Phillips
- Amazing Stories – John Williams
- The Amazing World of Gumball – Ben Locket
- Amen ("Shine On Me") – composed by Andraé Crouch; sung by Vanessa Bell Armstrong
- America's Funniest Home Videos ("The Funny Things You Do") – Jill Colucci
- American Bandstand ("Bandstand Boogie") – Charles Albertine (alt. version with lyrics by Barry Manilow and Bruce Sussman)
- American Dad ("Good Morning USA") – Walter Murphy; performed by Seth MacFarlane
- American Dreams ("Generation") – Emerson Hart
- Amphibia ("Welcome to Amphibia (instrumental)") – Doug Petty
- Andi Mack ("Tomorrow Starts Today") – Sabrina Carpenter
- The Andy Griffith Show ("The Fishin' Hole") – Earle Hagen and Herbert W. Spencer (performed by Andy Griffith)
- Anne with an E ("Ahead by a Century") – The Tragically Hip
- Angel ("Catharsis of Sufferance") – Darling Violetta
- Angels ("Motivation") – Alan Parker
- Angie ("Different Worlds") – Charles Fox and Norman Gimbel (sung by Maureen McGovern)
- Animaniacs – Richard Stone and Tom Ruegger (sung by Rob Paulsen, Jess Harnell and Tress MacNeille)
- Ann Jillian – Ann Jillian and Stan Harris
- Another Day ("Just Another Day") – Paul Williams
- Another Life - Brent Havens
- Another World ("Another World") – Crystal Gayle and Gary Morris (1987–1996)
- The Ant and the Aardvark – Doug Goodwin
- Apple's Way – Morton Stevens
- The Apprentice ("For the Love of Money") – (The O'Jays)
- Archer ("Archie Theme Song") – JG Thirlwell
- Archie Bunker's Place ("Those Were the Days") – Lee Adams and Charles Strouse (Ray Conniff instrumental version); ("Remembering You") – Roger Kellaway and Carroll O'Connor
- The Archie Show ("Sugar, Sugar") – Jeff Barry and Andy Kim (performed by The Archies)
- Are You Being Served? – David Croft and Ronnie Hazlehurst, performed by Stephanie Gathercole and Ronnie Hazlehurst orchestra
- Arthur ("Believe it Yourself") – Ziggy Marley and the Melody Makers
- As the Bell Rings ("Shadow") – Demi Lovato and Tony Oller
- As Time Goes By – Joe Fagin
- As Told by Ginger ("I'm In Between") – Macy Gray
- Ask the Family ("Acka Raga") – Joe Harriott and John Mayer
- The Associates ("Wall Street Blues") – B.B. King
- The A-Team – Mike Post and Pete Carpenter
- Atomic Betty – Tajja Isen
- Auf Wiedersehen, Pet ("Breaking Away" / "Livin' Alright") – Ian La Frenais and David Mackay, performed by Joe Fagin – Series 1, ("Back With the Boys Again"/ "Get It Right") – by La Frenais and Mackay, performed by Fagin – Series 2, ("Why Aye Man") – Mark Knopfler – Series 3
- Austin & Ally ("Can't Do It Without You") – Ross Lynch (seasons 1–3) and Laura Marano (season 4)
- Austin City Limits ("London Homesick Blues") – Gary P. Nunn
- Automan – Billy Hinsche and Stu Phillips
- The Avengers – John Dankworth (series 1, 2, 3) – Laurie Johnson (series 4, 5, 6)
- B Positive – Keb Mo' and Chuck Lorre
- B. J. and the Bear ("B. J. McKay") – Greg Evigan
- Baa Baa Black Sheep – Mike Post and Pete Carpenter
- Babes – Dan Foliart and Howard Pearl
- Baby Blues ("It's All Been Done") – Barenaked Ladies
- Babylon 5 – Christopher Franke
- Bachelor Father ("Bachelor Father Serenade") – Dave Kahn and Melvyn Lenard Gordon (1957–58); ("Bachelor Father Theme") – Jeff Alexander and Larry Ornstein (1958–59); ("Bachelor Father Theme") – John Williams (1959–60); ("Bentley's Theme") – Conrad Salinger (1960–62)
- Backstage ("Spark") – Stefanie McCarol
- Bad Girls Club ("Love Me or Hate Me") – Lady Sovereign
- Bagdad Cafe ("Calling You") – Jevetta Steele
- Banacek – Billy Goldenberg
- The Banana Splits ("The Tra La La Song (One Banana, Two Banana)") – Mark Barkan and Ritchie Adams
- Bare Essence ("In Finding You I Found Love") – Sarah Vaughan
- Barefoot in the Park – Darlene Love and The Blossoms
- Baretta ("Keep Your Eye on the Sparrow") – Dave Grusin and Morgan Ames; Performed by Sammy Davis Jr.
- The Barkleys – Doug Goodwin
- Barnaby Jones – Jerry Goldsmith
- Barney & Friends ("Barney is a Dinosaur") – Philip A. Parker; performed by Bob Singleton's Kids' Chorus. ("I Love You" (closing song) – Lee Bernstein; performed by the cast.
- Barney Miller – Jack Elliott and Allyn Ferguson
- The Baron – Edwin Astley
- Bat Masterson – Bill Lee
- Batman ("Batman Theme") – Neal Hefti
- Battlestar Galactica – Glen A. Larson and Stu Phillips
- Battlestar Galactica (2004) – Bear McCreary
- Bay City Blues: – Mike Post
- Baywatch:
  - Opening theme: ("Save Me") - Peter Cetera (season 1); ("I'm Always Here") – Jimi Jamison (seasons 2–10); ("Let Me Be the One") Fiji (season 11);
  - Closing theme: ("Current of Love") – David Hasselhoff (seasons 2–4); ("I Believe") - David Hasselhoff and Laura Branigan (season 5
- Baywatch Nights:
  - Opening theme: ("After the Sun Goes Down") – Lou Rawls (season one), ("The Nights Will Never Be the Same") – Alfonzo Blackwell (season two)
  - Closing theme: ("Into the Night") – David Hasselhoff (season one)
- Bear Behaving Badly – Barney Harwood
- Bear in the Big Blue House – ("Welcome to the Blue House") (seasons 1–3), ("A Berry Bear Christmas") (episodes 90–91), ("Welcome to Woodland Valley") (season 4) – (Peter Lurye, performed by the cast), ("Goodbye Song") – (Peter Lurye, performed by Bear and Luna)
- Beat Bugs ("All You Need Is Love") – John Lennon, Paul McCartney (composers)
- Beauty and the Beast – Lee Holdridge
- Beavis and Butt-Head - Mike Judge
- Beggar My Neighbour – Alan Roper
- Bella and the Bulldogs ("One of the Boys") – Brec Bassinger
- Ben 10 – Moxy
- The Benny Hill Show ("Yakety Sax") – Boots Randolph
- Benson – George Tipton
- The Berenstain Bears – Lee Ann Womack
- The Bernie Mac Show – Stanley A. Smith
- Best Friends Whenever ("Whenever") – Forever in Your Mind
- Best of the West – Rex Allen
- The Beverly Hillbillies ("The Ballad of Jed Clampett") – Paul Henning (played by Lester Flatt & Earl Scruggs); sung by Jerry Scoggins
- Beverly Hills, 90210 – John E. Davis
- Bewitched – Howard Greenfield and Jack Keller
- The Big Bang Theory – Barenaked Ladies
- Big Blue – Timbaland
- Big City Greens ("Big City Greens Main Title Theme") – The Mowgli's; ("Do it All Again") – The Houghton Brothers
- Big Love ("God Only Knows") – Brian Wilson and Tony Asher (performed by The Beach Boys)
- Big Time Rush ("Big Time Rush Theme) - Big Time Rush
- The Big Valley – George Duning
- The Bill Cosby Show ("Hikky Burr") – Quincy Jones and Bill Cosby
- The Bill Dana Show ("Jose's Theme") – Earle Hagen
- Billy ("You Could Be The Only One") – Ray Kennedy
- Billy (1992) ("I've Told Every Little Star") – Sonny Rollins
- The Bing Crosby Show "There's More to Life Than Just a Living" (opening theme) and "It All Adds Up to Love" (closing theme) by Bing Crosby
- The Bionic Woman – Jerry Fielding
- Bizaardvark ("Let's Go Make Some Videos") – Olivia Rodrigo and Madison Hu
- Blackadder – Howard Goodall
- Black Books – Jonathan Whitehead
- Black Saddle – Jerry Goldsmith and Arthur Morton
- Blake's 7 – Dudley Simpson
- Blansky's Beauties ("I Want It All") – Cyndi Grecco
- Bleach – Orange Range
- Bless This House – Geoff Love
- Blockbusters (UK) ("Quiz Wizard") – Ed Welch
- Blockbusters (US) – Bob Cobert
- Blondie – Will Hutchins and Patricia Harty
- Blossom ("My Opinionation") – Dr. John
- Blue Bloods ("Reagan's Theme") – Rob Simonsen
- The Blue Knight ("Bumper's Theme") – Henry Mancini
- Blue's Clues – ("Blue's Clues Theme") – Nick Balaban and Michael Rubin
- Bluey – Joff Bush and David Barber
- Boardwalk Empire ("Straight Up and Down") – The Brian Jonestown Massacre
- Bob & Carol & Ted & Alice – Artie Butler
- Bob Hearts Abishola (Ifanla") - Sola Akingbola
- The Bob Hope Show ("Thanks for the Memory") – Leo Robin and Ralph Rainger
- The Bob Newhart Show ("Home to Emily") – Lorenzo Music and Henrietta Music
- Bob the Builder ("Can We Fix It?") – Paul K. Joyce
- Bobby's World – John Tesh
- The Bold and the Beautiful ("High Upon This Love") – Jack Allocco and David Kurtz; performed by Dionne Warwick
- Bonanza – Jay Livingston and Ray Evans
- Bones – The Crystal Method
- Boon ("Hi Ho Silver") – Jim Diamond
- Bookmarks ("Don’t Forget Who You Are") – Common
- Booker ("Hot in the City") – Billy Idol
- Bosom Buddies ("My Life") – Billy Joel
- Bosch ("Can't Let Go") – Caught A Ghost
- Bottom ("BB's Blues") – B.B. King
- Bourbon Street Beat – Mack David and Jerry Livingston
- Boy Meets World – Ray Colcord (seasons 1–4); Phil Rosenthal (seasons 5–7)
- Bracken's World – David Rose first season; ("Worlds") – The Lettermen (second season)
- The Brady Bunch – Frank De Vol and Sherwood Schwartz (performed first season by The Peppermint Trolley Company; seasons 2–5 by The Brady Bunch Kids)
- Brand New Life – Jill Colucci
- Branded – Dominic Frontiere and Alan Alch
- Bratz ("Bratz TV Theme") – Lauren Evans
- Bread – David Mackay
- Breaking Point – David Raksin
- Bret Maverick ("Maverick Didn't Come Here to Lose") – Ed Bruce
- Bridget Loves Bernie – Jerry Fielding
- Brooklyn Bridge ("Just Over the Brooklyn Bridge") – composed by Marvin Hamlisch; lyrics by Alan and Marilyn Bergman; performed by Art Garfunkel
- Brotherly Love ("No Matter Where You Are") – Joey Lawrence
- Brutally Normal ("Green Light") – Jeremy Toback
- Brush Strokes ("Because of You") – Dexys Midnight Runners
- Bubble Guppies – Terry Fryer
- The Buccaneers – Edwin Astley
- Buck Rogers in the 25th Century ("Suspension") – Kipp Lennon; composed by Glen A. Larson
- Buffy the Vampire Slayer – Nerf Herder
- The Bugs Bunny Show ("This Is It-The Bugs Bunny Overture") – Mack David and Jerry Livingston
- The Bugaloos – lyrics by Norman Gimbel, composed by Charles Fox, performed by The Bugaloos cast
- Bunk'd ("Kikiwaka") – Kevin Quinn
- The Busy World of Richard Scarry – Milan Kymlicka
- Butterflies ("Love is Like a Butterfly") – Dolly Parton (adapted by Ronnie Hazlehurst, performed by Clare Torry)
- The Buzz on Maggie – ("Just the Way I Am") – Skye Sweetnam

== C – D ==
- C.P.O. Sharkey – Peter Matz
- Cagney & Lacey – Bill Conti
- Caillou ("I'm Caillou") – performed by the title character
- California Dreams – Brent Gore and Heidi Lenhart, first season; Brent Gore and Jennie Kwan, second season; Jay Anthony Franke and Jennie Kwan, (seasons 4 and 5)
- California Fever – Jimmy McNichol
- Call My Bluff ("Ciccolino") – Norrie Paramor
- Camp Lazlo – Andy Paley and Terry Scott Taylor
- Captain Nice – Vic Mizzy
- Captain Pugwash ("Shipshape") – Johnny Pearson
- Captain Scarlet and the Mysterons – The Spectrum
- Car 54, Where Are You? – John Strauss and Nat Hiken
- The Cara Williams Show ("Cara's Theme") – Kenyon Hopkins
- Care Bears: Adventures in Care-a-lot ("We Are Care Bears") – Kay Hanley
- Care Bears: Welcome to Care-a-Lot ("We'll Always be There!") – Richard Evans and Chip Whitewood
- The Carol Burnett Show ("I'm So Glad We Had This Time Together") – Joe Hamilton
- Casey, Crime Photographer – Morton Gould
- Casper the Friendly Ghost – Winston Sharples
- The Catherine Tate Show ("In These Shoes?") – Kirsty MacColl (Series 1), Howard Goodall (Series 2–3)
- Cattanooga Cats – Mike Curb
- CBS News Sunday Morning ("Abblasen") - Gottfried Reiche
- ChalkZone (“Rudy’s Got the Chalk”) - Guy Moon, Thomas Chase and Steve Rucker
- The Champions – Tony Hatch
- Chance in a Million ("Taking a Chance on Love") – Vernon Duke, Ted Fetter and John La Touche, performed by The Ladybirds
- The Chase ("Face the Facts") – Paul Farrer
- Charles in Charge – David Kurtz, Michael Jacobs, and Al Burton; performed by Shandi Sinnamon
- Charlie Hoover ("Wild Thing") – Chip Taylor; end credits by Dennis Belfield and Joey Carbone
- Charlie's Angels – Jack Elliott and Allyn Ferguson
- Charmed ("How Soon Is Now?") – Love Spit Love; Closing theme by Tim Truman (season 1), Jay Gruska and J. Peter Robinson (seasons 2–8)
- Chef! ("Serious Profession") – Omar Lye-Fook
- Cheers ("Where Everybody Knows Your Name") – Judy Hart Angelo and Gary Portnoy, performed by Gary Portnoy
- Cheyenne – William Lava and Stan Jones
- Cheyenne (2006) ("Hanging On") – Cheyenne Kimball
- Chicago Fire – Atli Örvarsson
- Chicago Hope ("Theme from Chicago Hope") – Mark Isham
- Chicago Med – Atli Örvarsson
- Chicago P.D. – Atli Örvarsson
- The Chicken Squad – Renee Sands
- Chico and the Man – José Feliciano
- China Beach – ("Reflections") – The Supremes; closing theme by John Rubinstein
- Chip 'n Dale: Rescue Rangers – Mark Mueller
- CHiPs – John Carl Parker (season one; season two & onward theme arranged by Alan Silvestri; rejected, un-used theme by Mike Post)
- Chopper One – Dominic Frontiere
- Chuck ("Short Skirt/Long Jacket") – Cake
- ChuckleVision – Dave Cook
- Cimarron Strip – Maurice Jarre
- Circus Boy – Hal Hopper and Victor McLeod
- Citizen Smith ("The Red Flag") by Jim Connell and Melchior Franck, ("The Glorious Day") composed by John Sullivan, performed by Robert Lindsay
- City of Angels – Nelson Riddle
- Clarissa Explains It All ("Way Cool") – Rachel Sweet
- The Cleveland Show – Walter Murphy (vocal by Mike Henry)
- The Clothes Show ("Opportunities (Let's Make Lots of Money)") – Pet Shop Boys
- Clueless ("Ordinary Girl") – China Forbes
- Coach – John Morris
- Code Lyoko ("A World Without Danger") – Franck Keller and Ygal Amar
- Code Monkeys ("Code Monkey") – Jonathan Coulton
- The Colbert Report ("Baby Mumbles") – Cheap Trick
- College Football on NBC Sports ("Here Come Saturday Night") - Fall Out Boy
- Colonel Humphrey Flack – Dave Kahn and Raoul Kraushaar
- Colonel March of Scotland Yard – William Alwyn
- Colt .45 – Hal Hopper
- Columbo (Various Themes) – Billy Goldenberg, Gil Mellé, Dick DeBenedictis
- Combat! – Leonard Rosenman
- Coming of Age ("Sing, Sing, Sing") – Louis Prima
- Community ("At Least It Was Here") – The 88
- Condo ("Live and Love it Up") – Drake Frye
- Coop & Cami Ask the World ("Ask the World") – Dakota Lotus and Ruby Rose Turner
- Cop Rock ("Under the Gun") – Randy Newman
- COPS ("Bad Boys") – Inner Circle
- Corduroy – Ray Parker and Tom Szczesniak
- Corner Gas ("Not a Lot Going On") – Craig Northey and Jesse Valenzuela
- Coronet Blue – Lenny Welch
- Cory in the House – Kyle Massey and Maiara Walsh
- The Cosby Mysteries – Craig Handy and David Weiss
- The Cosby Show ("Kiss Me") – Stu Gardner and Bill Cosby; (sung by Bobby McFerrin)
- The Courtship of Eddie's Father ("Best Friend") – Harry Nilsson
- Cover Up ("Holding Out for a Hero") – E. G. Daily
- Cow and Chicken – Guy Moon
- Cowboy Bebop ("Tank!" / "The Real Folk Blues") – Yoko Kanno, performed by Seatbelts
- Cowboy in Africa – Malcolm Arnold
- The Cramp Twins – Hélène Muddiman
- Crime Story ("Runaway") – Del Shannon and Max Crook
- Crocodile Shoes – Jimmy Nail
- Crossing Jordan – Lisa Coleman and Wendy Melvoin
- The Crown – Hans Zimmer
- Crusade – Evan Chen
- CSI: Crime Scene Investigation ("Who Are You") – Pete Townshend; performed by The Who
- CSI: Cyber ("I Can See for Miles") – Pete Townshend; performed by The Who
- CSI: Miami ("Won't Get Fooled Again") – Pete Townshend; performed by The Who
- CSI: NY ("Baba O'Riley") – Pete Townshend; performed by The Who
- Curb Your Enthusiasm ("Frolic") - by Luciano Michelini
- Curious George ("Like Curious George") – Dr. John
- Dad's Army ("Who Do You Think You Are Kidding, Mr. Hitler?") – performed by Bud Flanagan and the Orchestra of the Band of the Coldstream Guards
- The Daily Show ("Dog on Fire") – Bob Mould; performed by They Might Be Giants
- Daktari – Shelly Manne and Henryk Vars
- Dallas – Jerrold Immel
- Damages ("When I Am Through With You") – The VLA
- Dan August ("Dan August Theme") – Dave Grusin
- Danger Man – Series 1 "The Danger Man Theme" Edwin Astley, series 2–4 "High Wire" Edwin Astley, series 2–4 in the U.S. as Secret Agent, "Secret Agent Man" theme composed by P. F. Sloan and Steve Barri, and recorded by Johnny Rivers.
- Daniel Boone – Vera Matson and Lionel Newman; (sung by The Imperials)
- Daniel Tiger's Neighborhood ("Won't You Be My Neighbor") – Fred Rogers, David Kelly, James Chapple, Brian Pickett and Graeme Cornies
- Danny Phantom – Guy Moon and Butch Hartman
- The Danny Thomas Show – Earle Hagen and Herbert W. Spencer
- Darcy's Wild Life – Fan 3
- Daria ("You're Standing on My Neck") – Splendora
- Dark ("Goodbye") – Apparat
- Dark Angel – Chuck D and Gary G-Wiz
- Dark Shadows – Bob Cobert
- The Darling Buds of May – Pip Burley
- The Dating Game ("Stampede") - Chuck Barris
- Dave's World ("You May Be Right") – Billy Joel, performed by Southside Johnny
- David Cassidy: Man Undercover ("Hard Crimes") – David Cassidy
- Davis Rules – Mark Mothersbaugh
- Dawson's Creek ("I Don't Want to Wait") – Paula Cole
- Day by Day – Sammy Cahn, Axel Stordahl and Paul Weston (performed by Clydine Jackson)
- The Days and Nights of Molly Dodd – Patrick Williams
- Days of Our Lives – Charles Albertine, Tommy Boyce and Bobby Hart
- DC Super Hero Girls ("Super Life") – Kay Hanley and Michelle Lewis
- Deadwood – David Schwartz
- Dear John – theme song composed by John Sullivan, vocal by Wendy Talbot
- The Debbie Reynolds Show ("With a Little Love (Just a Little Love)") – Debbie Reynolds
- The Defenders – Leonard Rosenman
- Defiance – Bear McCreary
- Definition ("Soul Bossa Nova") – Quincy Jones
- Degrassi: The Next Generation ("Whatever it Takes") – Dalbello
- Delta ("Climb That Mountain High") – Reba McEntire
- Delta House – Michael Simmons
- The Dennis O'Keefe Show – Leon Klatzkin
- Dennis the Gnasher (1996) – Roger Jackson
- Dennis the Menace (1959) – William Loose and John Seely
- Department S – Edwin Astley
- Designing Women ("Georgia on My Mind" – performed as an instrumental by Doc Severinsen (seasons 1–2), Bruce Miller (seasons 3–5) and Ray Charles (season 6)
- Desmond's ("Don't Scratch My Soca") – Norman Beaton
- Desperate Housewives – Danny Elfman
- Detectorists – Johnny Flynn
- Devious Maids – Edward Shearmur
- Dexter – Rolfe Kent
- Dexter's Laboratory – Thomas Chase and Steve Rucker
- Dharma & Greg – Dennis C. Brown
- Diagnosis: Murder – Dick DeBenedictis
- Diagnosis: Unknown ("Coffee's Theme") – Irwin Kostal, Edward Scott and Joe Hamilton
- Dick Turpin – Denis King
- The Dick Van Dyke Show ("Keep Your Fingers Crossed") – Earle Hagen; unused lyrics by Morey Amsterdam
- Diff'rent Strokes ("It Takes Diff'rent Strokes") – Alan Thicke, Al Burton and Gloria Loring, performed by Thicke
- A Different World – Stu Gardner, Bill Cosby and Dawnn Lewis performed by Phoebe Snow (season 1); Aretha Franklin (seasons 2–5), later Boyz II Men (season 6)
- Dilbert – Danny Elfman
- The Dinah Shore Chevy Show ("See The U.S.A. In Your Chevrolet") – Leo Corday and Leon Carr; performed by Dinah Shore
- The District Nurse – Ronnie Hazlehurst
- Doc ("Stand Still") – Billy Ray Cyrus
- Doc McStuffins ("The Doc Is In") – China Anne McClain (seasons 1–3); Amber Riley (season 4)
- Doctor Who ("Doctor Who theme music") – Ron Grainer, originally arranged by Delia Derbyshire
- Dodger, Bonzo and the Rest ("Our House") – composed by Madness Performed by cast
- Dog the Bounty Hunter – Ozzy Osbourne
- Dolly ("Love Is Like a Butterfly") – Dolly Parton
- Dolly (1987) ("Baby I'm Burnin'") – Dolly Parton
- Domestic Life ("God Bless the Domestic Life") – Martin Mull
- The Donna Reed Show ("Happy Days") – John Seely
- Doogie Howser, M.D. – Mike Post
- Doomwatch – Max Harris
- Dora the Explorer – Billy Straus
- The Doris Day Show ("Que Sera, Sera (Whatever Will Be, Will Be)") – Doris Day
- Dorothy ("Learning from Each Other") – Dorothy Loudon
- Double Dare - Sylvester Levay
- Double Dare (1986) - Edd Kalehoff
- Doug – Dan Sawyer and Fred Newman
- Down the Shore ("I Don't Wanna Go Home") – Southside Johnny and the Asbury Jukes
- Down to Earth – Tom Wells
- Downton Abbey ("Did I Make the Most of Loving You?") – John Lunn
- Downtown ("Money (That's What I Want)") – Ronnie Milsap
- Dr. Kildare ("Theme from Dr. Kildare (Three Stars Will Shine Tonight)") – Jerry Goldsmith
- Dr. Phil ("Shine") – Meredith Brooks
- Dr. Simon Locke/Police Surgeon – Richard Markowitz
- Dr. Slump ("Waiwai World") – Shunsuke Kikuchi
- Dragnet – Main Theme ("Danger Ahead") by Miklós Rózsa; "Dragnet March" by Walter Schumann; 1967 closing theme by Lyn Murray
- Dragon Ball Z (1996 English dub) – Main Title ("Rock the Dragon") by Ron Wasserman and Jeremy Sweet
- Dragon Tales - performed by Mary Wood
- Drake & Josh ("I Found a Way") – Drake Bell
- The Drew Carey Show ("Moon Over Parma") – Drew Carey; ("Five O'Clock World") – The Vogues; ("Cleveland Rocks") – The Presidents of the United States of America
- Duck Dodgers – Tom Jones and The Flaming Lips
- Duck Dynasty ("Sharp Dressed Man") – ZZ Top
- The Duck Factory ("Sure Beats Working for a Living") – Mark Vieha
- DuckTales – Mark Mueller
- DuckTales (2017) – Felicia Barton
- Dudley Do-Right – Sheldon Allman and Stan Worth
- Due South ("Due South Theme") – Jay Semko
- Duet – Ursula Walker and Tony Franklin
- The Dukes of Hazzard ("Good Ol' Boys") – Waylon Jennings
- The Dumplings ("Two By Two, Side by Side") – Steve Lawrence
- Dusty's Trail – Frank De Vol and Sherwood Schwartz; (performed by Mel Street)
- Dynasty – Bill Conti

== E – F ==
- Early Edition – W. G. Snuffy Walden
- East Side West Side – Kenyon Hopkins
- EastEnders ("EastEnders theme tune") – Simon May and Leslie Osborne
- Easy Street – Loni Anderson
- ECW Hardcore TV ("This is Extreme!") – Harry Slash & The Slashtones
- Ed ("Next Year") – Foo Fighters (seasons 1 and 3-4); ("Moment in the Sun") - Clem Snide (season 2)
- Ed, Edd n Eddy – Patric Caird
- The Ed Sullivan Show ("Toast") – Ray Bloch
- Eight Is Enough – Grant Goodeve
- Eisenhower and Lutz ("Boys Like You") – Amanda McBroom
- Electra Woman and Dyna Girl – Jimmie Haskell
- Electric Circus "Divine Emotions (Instrumental)" – Narada Michael Walden, (1988–96); "Hang On Here We Go!" – Jet Fuel featuring Aleah D'Kos and K-os (1996–2003)
- The Electric Company – Theme song composed by Eric Rogers; performed by original cast
- The Electric Company (2009 TV series) ("Turn Up the Power") – original cast
- Elena of Avalor – Gaby Moreno
- Ellen - composed by W. G. Snuffy Walden; ("So Called Friend") – Texas
- The Ellen Burstyn Show ("Nothing in the World Like Love") – Rita Coolidge
- The Ellen DeGeneres Show ("Today's the Day") – Pink
- Ellery Queen – Elmer Bernstein
- Emergency! – Nelson Riddle and Billy May
- The Emperor's New School ("Kuzco Academy") – Danny Jacob
- Empty Nest ("Life Goes On") – John Bettis and George Tipton, performed by Billy Vera
- Entertainment Tonight – Michael Mark
- Entourage ("Superhero") – Jane's Addiction
- The Equalizer – Stewart Copeland
- ER – James Newton Howard
- Eurotrash ("Saint-Tropez") – Francis Lai
- The Eve Arden Show – Wilbur Hatch
- Evening Shade – Instrumental theme by Sonny Curtis (1990–1992); Theme with lyrics by Bobby Goldsboro (1992–1994), performed by Dr. John (season 3), Goldsboro (season 4)
- Ever Decreasing Circles – Dmitri Shostakovich
- Every Witch Way - Paola Andino
- Everybody Hates Chris – Marcus Miller
- Everybody Loves Raymond – Rick Marotta and Terry Trotter
- The Evil Touch – Laurie Lewis
- The Exile – Michel Rubini
- F Troop – William Lava and Irving Taylor
- The F.B.I. – Bronislaw Kaper
- The F Word – Babybird
- The Facts of Life – Al Burton, Gloria Loring, and Alan Thicke, performed by Charlotte Rae (season 1), Loring (seasons 2–9)
- Fair Exchange – Cyril J. Mockridge
- The Fairly OddParents – Ron Jones and Butch Hartman
- Falcon Crest – Bill Conti
- The Fall and Rise of Reginald Perrin – Ronnie Hazlehurst
- The Fall Guy ("Unknown Stuntman") – Lee Majors
- Fame ("Fame") – Dean Pitchford and Michael Gore; performed by Erica Gimpel (seasons 1–4) Loretta Chandler (seasons 5–6)
- Family – John Rubinstein
- Family Affair – Frank De Vol
- Family Feud – Score Productions
- Family Guy (opening with a parody of the All in the Family theme) – Walter Murphy
- Family Law ("War") – Edwin Starr and the Brink
- Family Matters ("As Days Go By") – Jesse Frederick
- Family Ties ("Without Us") – Jeff Barry and Tom Scott; (sung by Mindy Sterling and Dennis Tufano) season 1, episodes 1–10; (sung by Johnny Mathis and Deniece Williams)
- The Famous Teddy Z – written by Guy Moon, Stephanie Tyrell and Steve Tyrell; performed by Bill Champlin
- Fancy Nancy ("Add a Little Fancy") – Matthew Tishler and Krista Tucker
- Fantasy Island – Laurence Rosenthal
- Far Out Space Nuts – Michael Lloyd
- The Farmer's Daughter – Barry Mann and Cynthia Weil
- Farscape – Guy Gross
- Fast Layne ("Just Wanna Go") – Rayla
- The Fast Show – ("Release Me") by Eddie Miller, performed by Paul Whitehouse
- Fast Times – Oingo Boingo
- Fastlane – Snoop Dogg and Charlie Clouser
- Fat Albert and the Cosby Kids ("Gonna Have a Good Time (Fat Albert Theme") – Michael Gray
- Father Dowling Mysteries – Dick DeBenedictis
- Father Knows Best – Don Ferris and Izzy Friedman
- Father Ted ("Songs Of Love") – The Divine Comedy
- Fawlty Towers – Dennis Wilson
- Fay ("Coming Into My Own") – Jaye P. Morgan
- Felicity ("Felicity Theme) – J. J. Abrams (seasons 1–2); ("New Version of You") – Andrew Jarecki (seasons 3–4)
- The Felony Squad – Pete Rugolo
- Film... ("I Wish I Knew How It Would Feel to Be Free") – Billy Taylor
- Filthy Rich – Bucky Jones and Ronnie McDowell
- Finder of Lost Loves ("Finder of Lost Loves") – Burt Bacharach and Carole Bayer Sager theme sung by Dionne Warwick
- Fireball XL5 ("Fireball") – Don Spencer
- Firefly ("Ballad of Serenity") – Sonny Rhodes
- Firing Line ("Brandenburg Concertos") – Johann Sebastian Bach
- First Impressions – Harry Nilsson
- Fish – Jack Elliott and Allyn Ferguson
- Fish Hooks ("Ring the Bell") – Jeremy Fisher
- Flamingo Road – Gerald Fried
- The Flintstones ("Meet The Flintstones") – Hoyt Curtin, William Hanna and Joseph Barbera
- Flipper – Henryk Wars and "By" Dunham (performed by Frankie Randall)
- Flo ("Flo's Yellow Rose") – Hoyt Axton
- Flying Blind ("A Million Miles Away") – David Byrne
- The Flying Nun ("Who Needs Wings to Fly?") – Dominic Frontiere
- Forever Knight – Fred Mollin
- Formula One (BBC) ("The Chain") – Fleetwood Mac
- Foster's Home for Imaginary Friends – James L. Venable
- The Four Just Men – Francis Chagrin
- Fox NFL Sunday - Scott Schreer
- Fraggle Rock ("Down at Fraggle Rock") – Philip Balsam and Dennis Lee
- Frank's Place ("Do You Know What It Means to Miss New Orleans?") – Louis Armstrong
- Franklin ("Hey It's Franklin") – Bruce Cockburn
- Frasier ("Tossed Salads and Scrambled Eggs") – Kelsey Grammer
- Freaks and Geeks ("Bad Reputation") – Joan Jett
- Free Spirit ("She's a Free Spirit") – Steve Dorff and John Bettis
- French and Saunders – Rowland Rivron
- The Fresh Beat Band ("The Fresh Beat Band!") – Matter Music (Sung by Yvette Gonzalez-Nacer, Thomas Hobson, Shayna Rose/Tara Perry, and Jon Beavers)
- Fresh Beat Band of Spies – Peter Zizzo
- The Fresh Prince of Bel-Air ("Yo' Home to Bel-Air") – DJ Jazzy Jeff & the Fresh Prince
- Friday Night Dinner – ("Animal") – Miike Snow
- Friday the 13th: The Series – Fred Mollin
- Friends ("I'll Be There For You") – The Rembrandts
- The Fugitive – Pete Rugolo
- Full Frontal with Samantha Bee ("Boys Wanna Be Her") – Peaches (musician)
- Full House ("Everywhere You Look") – Jesse Frederick
- Fuller House ("Everywhere You Look remix version") – Carly Rae Jepsen
- Futurama – Christopher Tyng

== G – H ==
- Gabby Duran & the Unsittables ("I Do My Thing") – Kylie Cantrall
- Game of Thrones – Ramin Djawadi
- Game On – ("Where I Find My Heaven") by the Gigolo Aunts
- Game Shakers ("Drop Dat What") – Kel Mitchell
- Garroway at Large ("Sentimental Journey") – Les Brown, Ben Homer and Bud Green
- The Garry Moore Show ("Thanks for Dropping By") – Joe Hamilton
- The Gene Autry Show ("Back in the Saddle Again") – Gene Autry and Ray Whitley
- General Hospital (Autumn Breeze") – Jack Urbont; ("Faces of the Heart") Dave Koz
- The Generation Game ("Life Is The Name Of The Game") – Bruce Forsyth
- Gentle Ben – Harry Sukman
- The George Burns and Gracie Allen Show ("Love Nest") – Louis Hirsch and Otto Harbach
- The George Burns Show – Jeff Alexander
- George Lopez ("Low Rider") – War
- George of the Jungle – Stan Worth and Sheldon Allman
- George Shrinks – Colin James, composed by Roberto Occhipinti
- Get a Life ("Stand") – R.E.M.; end credits by Stewart Levin
- The Get Along Gang – Shuki Levy and Haim Saban
- Get Smart – Irving Szathmary
- Get Some In! – Alan Braden, performed by cast
- Getting Together – Bobby Sherman
- The Ghost & Mrs. Muir – Dave Grusin
- The Ghost Busters ("We're the Ghost Busters") – Forrest Tucker and Larry Storch
- Ghost Story – Billy Goldenberg
- Gideon's Way – Edwin Astley
- Gidget ("(Wait Till You See) My Gidget") – Howard Greenfield and Jack Keller (performed in the pilot episode by The Four Freshmen and by Johnny Tillotson in all other episodes)
- Gilligan's Island ("The Ballad of Gilligan's Isle") – Sherwood Schwartz and George Wyle (performed first season by The Wellingtons; seasons 2 and 3 by The Eligibles)
- Gilmore Girls ("Where You Lead") – performed by Carole King and Louise Goffin
- Gimme a Break! – Nell Carter
- The Girl from U.N.C.L.E. - Dave Grusin
- Girl Meets World ("Take on the World") – Sabrina Carpenter and Rowan Blanchard
- Girlfriends ("My Girlfriend") – Angie Stone
- Gogglebox ("Perfect World") – Kodaline
- Go! Go! Cory Carson – Ryan Shore
- The Goldbergs ("Rewind") – I Fight Dragons
- The Golden Girls and The Golden Palace ("Thank You for Being a Friend") – composed by Andrew Gold, performed by Cynthia Fee (during Girls) and a male performer (during Palace)
- Golden Soak (Australian Drama Series) - The Lonely Shepherd - Gheorghe Zamfir
- Gomer Pyle – USMC – Earle Hagen
- Good Luck Charlie ("Hang in There Baby") – Bridgit Mendler
- The Good Guys ("Two Good Guys") – Jay Livingston, Ray Evans and Jerry Fielding
- The Good Life – Tony Orlando and Dawn
- Good Morning, Miami ("Once in a Lifetime") – John Rzeznik
- Good Morning, Miss Bliss ("These Are the Best of Times") – Charles Fox
- The Good Place – David Schwartz
- Good Sports ("Boom Boom Boom") – Al Green
- Good Times ("Good Times") – composed by Dave Grusin, Alan and Marilyn Bergman; performed by Jim Gilstrap and Blinky Wiiliams
- Good Witch – Jack Lenz
- The Goodies ("The Goodies Theme) – Bill Oddie and Michael Gibbs
- Goodnight Sweetheart – Ray Noble, Jimmy Campbell and Reg Connelly, performed by Al Bowlly
- Goof Troop – Phil Perry
- Gossip Girl ("Steps of the Met") – Transcenders
- Grange Hill ("Chicken Man") – Alan Hawkshaw
- Grand Prix Wrestling ("Let There Be Drums") – Incredible Bongo Band
- Grandstand ("News Scoop") – Len Stevens and Keith Mansfield
- Gravity Falls – Brad Breeck
- The Greatest American Hero ("Theme from The Greatest American Hero (Believe It or Not)") – Mike Post and Stephen Geyer (performed by Joey Scarbury)
- Green Acres – composed by Vic Mizzy; performed by Eddie Albert and Eva Gabor
- The Green Green Grass ("The Green Green Grass") – composed and performed by John Sullivan
- The Green Hornet ("Flight of the Bumblebee") – Nikolai Rimsky-Korsakov; orchestration by Billy May; conducted by Lionel Newman; trumpet solo by Al Hirt
- Grey's Anatomy ("Cosy in the Rocket") – Psapp
- The Grim Adventures of Billy & Mandy – Gregory Hinde and Drew Neumann
- Grojband – Brian Pickett and Graeme Cornies
- Grounded for Life – Ween
- Growing Pains ("As Long As We Got Each Other") – lyrics by John Bettis and Steve Dorff B. J. Thomas (season 1 solo) with Jennifer Warnes (seasons 2–7) and Dusty Springfield (season 4), Joe Chemay, Jim Haas, Jon Joyce and George Merrill (season 6, part of 7, and the series finale)
- The Guardian ("Empire on My Mind") – The Wallflowers
- La Güereja de mi vida- Benito Castro and María Elena Saldaña, performed by María Elena Saldaña
- Gullah Gullah Island ("Let's All Go to Gullah Gullah Island") – Peter Lurye
- Gun ("Happiness is a Warm Gun") – John Lennon and Paul McCartney; performed by U2
- Gunsmoke ("Old Trail") – Rex Koury
- H_{2}O: Just Add Water ("No Ordinary Girl") – Ellie Henderson (season 1), Kate Alexa (season 2) and Indiana Evans (season 3)
- Hancock's Half Hour – Angela Morley
- Handy Manny – Los Lobos
- Hanging In – Billy Byers
- Hannah Montana ("The Best of Both Worlds") – Miley Cyrus
- Hank – Johnny Mercer and Frank Perkins
- Happy Days ("Rock Around the Clock") – performed by Bill Haley & His Comets (1974–75); ("Happy Days (TV theme)") – Charles Fox and Norman Gimbel performed by Pratt & McClain (remaining seasons)
- Hardball ("Roll it Over") – Eddie Money
- Hardcastle and McCormick ("Drive") – David Morgan; ("Back to Back") – Joey Scarbury
- The Hardy Boys/Nancy Drew Mysteries – Glen A. Larson and Stu Phillips
- Harper Valley PTA – Jeannie C. Riley
- Harry and the Hendersons ("Your Feets Too Big") – Leon Redbone
- Harry O – Billy Goldenberg
- Harry's Game – Clannad
- Harsh Realm – Mark Snow
- Hart to Hart – Mark Snow
- Harts of the West ("In a Laid Back Way") – Clint Black
- The Harvey Korman Show ("Living Life Today") – Harvey Korman
- Have Gun – Will Travel ("The Ballad of Paladin") – Johnny Western, Richard Boone, and Sam Rolfe
- Have I Got News for You – Big George
- Hawaii Five-O – Morton Stevens
- Hawaiian Eye – Mack David and Jerry Livingston; (performed by Warren Barker)
- Hawaiian Heat ("Goodbye Blues") – Tom Scott and Candy Patterson
- Hazel ("Theme to Hazel") – Sammy Cahn and Jimmy Van Heusen; later version by The Modernaires
- He & She – Jerry Fielding
- Head of the Class – Ed Alton
- Heartbeat – Bob Montgomery and Norman Petty, performed by Nick Berry
- Heartland ("Dreamer") – Jenn Grant
- The Heights ("How Do You Talk to an Angel") – The Heights
- Hellsing ("Shine") – Mr. Big
- Hennesey – Sonny Burke
- Henry Hugglemonster ("Have a Henry Hugglemonster Day") – Matt Mahaffey
- Herbie, the Love Bug ("Herbie, My Best Friend") – Dean Jones
- Hercules ("Zero to Hero") – Alan Menken
- Hercules: The Legendary Journeys – Joseph LoDuca
- Here Come the Brides ("Seattle") – Bobby Sherman
- Here Come the Seventies – ("Tillicum") – composed by John Mills-Cockell, played by Syrinx
- Herencia maldita ("Una hombre de mi vida") - Angelica Maria
- Here's Boomer – Edward Leonetti and Zoey Wilson
- Here's Lucy – Wilbur Hatch
- Hetty Wainthropp Investigates – Nigel Hess
- Hey Arnold! – Jim Lang
- Hi-5 ("Five in The Air") – composed by Chris Harriott, performed by Hi-5
- Hi-5 USA) ("Hi-5 Theme") - composed by Chris Harriott
- Hi-de-Hi! ("Holiday Rock") – composed by Jimmy Perry, performed by Ken Barrie
- Hi Hi Puffy AmiYumi ("Hi Hi") – Puffy AmiYumi
- Hi Honey, I'm Home! Rupert Holmes
- Higglytown Heroes ("Here in Higglytown") – They Might Be Giants
- The High Chaparral – David Rose
- High Mountain Rangers – Lee Greenwood
- High Society (All the Right Moves) – OneRepublic
- Highlander: The Series ("Princes of the Universe") – Queen
- Highway Patrol – David Rose
- Highway to Heaven – David Rose
- Hill Street Blues – Mike Post
- The Hills ("Unwritten") – Natasha Bedingfield
- The Hitchhiker – Paul Hoffert
- The Hitchhiker's Guide to the Galaxy – Bernie Leadon
- The Hogan Family ("Together Through the Years") – Roberta Flack
- Hogan's Heroes – Jerry Fielding
- Home Improvement ("Iron John's Rock") – Dan Foliart
- Homeland – Sean Callery
- Hometown ("Sounds From my Hometown") - Tony Berg
- Hondo – Richard Markowitz
- The Honeymooners ("You're My Greatest Love") – Jackie Gleason
- Hot in Cleveland – Ron Wasserman and Emerson Swinford
- Horseland ("Let's Go to Horseland") – Slumber Party Girls
- Hotel – Henry Mancini
- House ("Teardrop") – Massive Attack
- How I Met Your Mother ("Hey Beautiful") – The Solids
- How to Get Away with Murder – Photek
- How to Rock ("Only You Can Be You") – Cymphonique Miller
- Howards' Way – Simon May
- H.R. Pufnstuf – Les Szarvas and Paul Simon
- The Huckleberry Hound Show – Hoyt Curtin
- Hugh and I – Angela Morley
- Human Target – Bear McCreary
- Hunter – Mike Post and Pete Carpenter

== I – J ==
- I Am Weasel – April March
- I Didn't Do It ("Time of Our Lives") – Olivia Holt
- I Didn't Know You Cared – Ronnie Hazlehurst
- I Dream of Jeannie – Season 1 theme by Richard Wess; seasons 2–5 by Hugo Montenegro and Buddy Kaye
- I Love Lucy – Eliot Daniel
- I Married Joan – Richard Mack, sung by the Roger Wagner Chorale
- I Spy – Earle Hagen
- I'll Fly Away – W. G. Snuffy Walden
- I'm a Big Girl Now – Diana Canova
- I'm with Her ("Is She Really Going Out with Him?") – Sugar Ray
- iCarly ("Leave It All to Me") – Miranda Cosgrove and featuring Drake Bell
- The Immortal – Dominic Frontiere
- Impact! ("Megatron") – Crazy Town
- In Living Color – Heavy D and Eddie F (seasons 1–2, 5); ("Cause That's the Way You Livin' When You're in Living Color") – Heavy D. and The Boyz (seasons 3–4)
- In the Heat of the Night – music by Quincy Jones, lyrics by Alan and Marilyn Bergman, performed by Bill Champlin
- The Inbetweeners ("Gone Up in Flames") – Morning Runner
- The Incredible Hulk ("The Lonely Man") – Joe Harnell
- In Sickness and in Health – Chas & Dave
- The Inspector (Theme from A Shot in the Dark) – Henry Mancini
- Inspector Gadget – Shuki Levy and Haim Saban
- Inspector Morse – Barrington Pheloung
- Interpol Calling – Clifton Parker
- The Invaders – Dominic Frontiere
- The Invisible Man (1958) – Sydney John Kay
- The Invisible Man (1975) – Henry Mancini
- Ironside – Quincy Jones
- The IT Crowd – Neil Hannon
- It Ain't Half Hot Mum ("Meet the Gang") – composed by Jimmy Perry, performed by cast
- It Takes a Thief – Dave Grusin
- It Takes Two ("Where Loves Spends the Night") – Paul Williams and Crystal Gayle
- It's a Big Big World – Mitchell Kriegman, performed by the cast
- It's a Living – composed by George Tipton, performed by Leslie Bricusse
- It's About Time – Sherwood Schwartz, George Wyle and Gerald Fried
- It's Academic ("The Race") – Yello; ("T.L.C. (Tender Lovin' Care") – MFSB (1976–2017); ("Just Let Go") – Marti Amado and Ron Bolton, music production by Network Music
- It's Always Sunny in Philadelphia ("Temptation Sensation") – Heinz Kiessling
- It's Garry Shandling's Show – Joey Carbone
- J.J. Starbuck ("Gone Again") - music by Mike Post, lyrics by Stephen Geyer performed by Ronnie Milsap
- The Jack Benny Program (end credit theme, "The J & M Stomp") – Mahlon Merrick
- The Jackie Gleason Show ("Melancholy Serenade") – Jackie Gleason
- Jackpot, 1974–75 version ("Jet Set") – Mike Vickers (later used for This Week in Baseball)
- JAG – Bruce Broughton
- Jake and the Fatman – Dick DeBenedictis
- Jake and the Never Land Pirates – Captain Bogg and Salty
- James at 15 ("James") – Lee Montgomery
- The Jamie Foxx Show ("Here Comes Jamie Foxx") and ("The Simple Things Are All I Need") – both versions performed by Jamie Foxx
- Jane and the Dragon – Tajja Isen
- Jay Jay the Jet Plane – opening theme performed by Parachute Express
- Jayce and the Wheeled Warriors ("Jayce and the Wheeled Warriors Opening Theme) and ("Keep on Rolling") – both performed by Shuki Levy
- The Jean Arthur Show ("Merry Merry-Go-Round") – Johnny Keating, Jay Richard Kennedy and Richard Quine
- Jeeves and Wooster – Anne Dudley
- Jennifer Slept Here – composed by Perry Botkin Jr., written by Clint Holmes, Ann Jillian, Joey Murcia, and Bill Payne, performed by Joey Scarbury
- The Jeffersons ("Movin' On Up") – Jeff Barry and Ja'Net DuBois
- Jellystone! – Ego Plum
- Jeopardy! ("Think Music") – Merv Griffin
- Jesse ("Time for You") – The Tories
- Jessie ("Hey Jessie") – Debby Ryan
- The Jetsons – Hoyt Curtin, William Hanna and Joseph Barbera
- Jimmy Kimmel Live! – Robert Goulet
- The Jimmy Stewart Show – Jeff Alexander
- Joan of Arcadia ("One of Us") – Joan Osborne
- Joanie Loves Chachi ("You Look at Me") – Scott Baio and Erin Moran
- Jodi Arias: Dirty Little Secret ("Dirty Little Secret") – The All-American Rejects
- Joey ("Sunny Hours") – Long Beach Dub Allstars featuring will.i.am
- The Joey Bishop Show ("Sometimes I'm Happy") – Vincent Youmans and Irving Caesar; ("Joey") – Sammy Cahn and Jimmy Van Heusen
- John from Cincinnati ("Johnny Appleseed") – The Mescaleros
- The John Larroquette Show ("Skrewy St. Louis Blues") – David Cassidy
- Johnny Ringo – Don Durant
- Johnny Staccato ("Staccato's Theme") – Elmer Bernstein
- Johnny Test ("Johnny Test opening theme") – Kevin Manthei (season 1), Kevin Riepl (season 1) and Ian LeFeuvre (seasons 2–6)
- The Joker's Wild
- Jonas ("Live to Party") – Jonas Brothers
- Jonny Quest – Hoyt Curtin
- Juke Box Jury ("Hit and Miss") – John Barry
- Julia – ("Julia's Theme") – Elmer Bernstein (seasons 1 and 2) and Jeff Alexander (season 3)
- Jungle Junction ("Deep Inside the Jungle") – Peter Lurye
- Just Good Friends – John Sullivan and Ronnie Hazlehurst, performed by Paul Nicholas
- Just Say Julie – The Usual Suspects
- Just Shoot Me! ("Life Keeps Bringin' Me Back to You") – vocal by Lauren Wood
- Just the Ten of Us ("Doin' it the Best I Can") – lyrics by John Bettis and Steve Dorff; (performed by Bill Medley)
- Justice ("Crown Imperial") – William Walton
- Justice (2006) ("Lawyers, Guns & Money") – Warren Zevon
- Justified ("Long Hard Times to Come") – Gangstagrass

== K – L ==
- K.C. Undercover ("Keep It Undercover") – Zendaya
- KaBlam! ("Skaternity") – The Toasters (affiliated as The Moon Ska Stompers)
- Kappa Mikey – ("Hey Hey Look Look") – Beat Crusaders
- Karen – Jack Marshall and Bob Mosher (performed by The Beach Boys)
- Kate & Allie ("Along Comes a Friend") – John Loeffler
- Kate & Mim-Mim ("You and Me, Kate & Mim-Mim") — Jessica Zraly
- Kath & Kim ("The Joker") – sung by Gina Riley
- Kath & Kim (American) ("Filthy/Gorgeous") – Scissor Sisters
- Keeping Up Appearances – Nick Ingham
- Kenan & Kel ("Aw, Here it Goes") – Coolio
- Kid 'n Play ("Rollin' with Kid 'n Play") – Kid 'n Play
- Kidd Video ("Video to Radio") – Shuki Levy and Haim Saban
- The Kids in the Hall ("Having an Average Weekend") - Shadowy Men on a Shadowy Planet
- Kids Incorporated - Manuel Cruz
- Kidsongs ("We Want Our Kidsongs") – Michael Lloyd
- Kiff – Nic Smal, Lucy Heavens and Brad Breeck
- Kim Possible ("Call Me, Beep Me!") – Christina Milian featuring Christy Carlson Romano
- The King of Queens ("Baby All My Life I Will Be Driving Home to You") – Billy Vera
- King of the Hill – The Refreshments
- King's Crossing – Jerrold Immel
- Kingdom Hospital ("Worry About You") – Ivy
- Knight & Daye – David Michael Frank
- Knight Rider – Glen A. Larson and Stu Phillips (later arrangement of theme was done by Don Peake)
- Knots Landing – Jerrold Immel
- Kojak – Billy Goldenberg (seasons 1–4); later version by John Cacavas (season 5)
- KonoSuba ("Fantastic Dreamer") – Machico
- Kolchak: The Night Stalker – Gil Mellé
- The Krypton Factor – Art of Noise
- Krystala – Aegis
- Kung Fu – Jim Helms
- The L Word ("The Way That We Live") – Betty
- L.A. Heat – Louis Febre
- L.A. Law – Mike Post
- La Femme Nikita – Mark Snow
- Lady Killers – Paul Lewis
- Laguna Beach: The Real Orange County ("Come Clean") – Hilary Duff
- Lancer – Jerome Moross
- Land of the Giants – John Williams (two themes)
- Land of the Lost – Linda Laurie and Michael Lloyd
- Land of the Lost (1991) – Kevin Kiner
- Laramie – Cyril J. Mockridge
- Laredo – Russell Garcia
- Las Vegas ("A Little Less Conversation") – Elvis Presley (remix by Junkie XL)
- Lassie – Les Baxter
- Last of the Summer Wine – Ronnie Hazlehurst
- A Laurel & Hardy Cartoon – Ted Nichols
- Laverne & Shirley ("Making Our Dreams Come True") – Charles Fox and Norman Gimbel (sung by Cyndi Grecco)
- Law & Order ("Theme of Law & Order") – Mike Post
- Law & Order: Criminal Intent ("Theme of Law & Order: Criminal Intent") – Mike Post
- Law & Order: Organized Crime ("Theme of Law & Order: Organized Crime") – Mike Post, theme composed by Ruth Barrett
- Law & Order: Special Victims Unit ("Theme of Law & Order: Special Victims Unit") – Mike Post
- Law & Order: Trial by Jury ("Theme of Law & Order: Trial by Jury") – Mike Post
- LAX ("Mr. Blue Sky") – Electric Light Orchestra
- LazyTown ("Welcome to LazyTown") – Jón Jósep Snæbjörnsson
- Leave It to Beaver ("The Toy Parade") – David Kahn, Melvyn Leonard and Mort Greene (Season 6 arrangement by Pete Rugolo)
- Leave it to Charlie – Derek Hilton
- The Legend of Tarzan ("Two Worlds") – Phil Collins
- Legend of the Seeker – Joseph LoDuca
- Liberty's Kids ("Through My Own Eyes") – Aaron Carter and Kayla Hinkle
- Lie to Me ("Brand New Day") – Ryan Star
- Life as We Know It ("Sooner or Later") – Michael Tolcher
- Life Goes On (A cover version of The Beatles' "Ob-La-Di, Ob-La-Da") – Patti LuPone and the rest of the cast
- Life with Lucy ("Every Day is Better Than Before") – Eydie Gormé
- Lifestyles of the Rich and Famous ("Come With Me Now") – Bill Conti and Norman Gimbel; ("Champagne Wishes and Cavivar Dreams") – Dionne Warwick
- Lilo & Stitch: The Series ("Aloha, E Komo Mai") – Jump5
- The Lion Guard ("Call of the Guard") – The Lion King Chorus
- Lipstick Jungle ("The Bomb") – Bitter:Sweet
- Little Einsteins – Billy Straus
- Little House on the Prairie – David Rose
- Little Witch Academia ("Shiny Ray") – Yurika
- Littlest Pet Shop – Daniel Ingram
- Liv and Maddie ("Better in Stereo") – Dove Cameron
- The Liver Birds – written and performed by The Scaffold
- Living Dolls ("Take Your Best Shot") – John Beasley and John Vester
- Living Single ("We Are Living Single") – Queen Latifah
- Living with Lydia – "Humoresque" (opening); "Dim Sum Song" (closing, performed by Lydia Shum)
- Lizzie McGuire ("We'll Figure It Out") – Angie Jaree
- Lois & Clark: The New Adventures of Superman – Jay Gruska
- The Lone Gunmen – Mark Snow
- The Lone Ranger ("William Tell Overture") – Gioachino Rossini
- Looney Tunes ("The Merry-Go-Round Broke Down") – Carl W. Stalling
- Lost in Space – John Williams (two themes)
- Lottery! ("Turn of the Cards") – Alan Graham
- Lou Grant – Patrick Williams
- The Loud House – Michelle Lewis, Doug Rockwell and Chris Savino
- Love, American Style – Charles Fox and Arnold Margolin (performed first season by The Cowsills; seasons 2–5 by The Ron Hicklin Singers)
- The Love Boat – Paul Williams and Charles Fox (sung by Jack Jones) (seasons 1–8); by Dionne Warwick (season 9)
- Lovejoy – Denis King
- Love Live! – Yoshiaki Fujisawa; ("Snow Halation") – Takahiro Yamada
- Love of Life ("The Life That You Love") – Carey Gold
- Love, Sidney ("Friends Forever") – (Opening theme by Tony Randall, Swoosie Kurtz & Kaleena Kiff), (Closing theme by Gladys & Bubba Knight)
- Love Thy Neighbor – Solomon Burke
- The Lucy–Desi Comedy Hour – Wilbur Hatch
- The Lucy Show – Wilbur Hatch
- Lush Life – Terence Trent D'Arby

== M – N ==
- M*A*S*H ("Suicide Is Painless") – Johnny Mandel
- MacGyver – Randy Edelman
- Mad About You ("Final Frontier") – Andrew Gold
- Mad Men ("A Beautiful Mine") – RJD2
- Maggie and the Ferocious Beast – Kristen Bone
- The Magic School Bus ("Ride on The Magic School Bus") – Little Richard, composed by Peter Lurye
- Magnum, P.I. – Ian Freebairn-Smith (Season 1); Mike Post and Pete Carpenter (remaining seasons)
- Makin' It ("Makin' It (song)") – David Naughton
- Malcolm in the Middle ("Boss of Me") – They Might Be Giants
- Mama's Family ("Bless My Happy Home") – Peter Matz; unused lyrics by Vicki Lawrence
- The Man from U.N.C.L.E. – Jerry Goldsmith
- Man in a Suitcase – Ron Grainer
- Man of the World – Henry Mancini
- Maniac Mansion – Jane Siberry and Mary Margaret O'Hara
- Manimal - Paul Chihara
- Mannix – Lalo Schifrin
- The Many Loves of Dobie Gillis ("Dobie") – Lionel Newman and Max Shulman; performed by Judd Conlon's Rhythmaires (seasons 1–2) and instrumental version with (seasons 3–4)
- Mapp & Lucia – Jim Parker
- Marcus Welby, M.D. – Leonard Rosenman
- Marriage Lines – Dennis Wilson
- Married... with Children ("Love and Marriage") – Sammy Cahn and Jimmy Van Heusen; performed by Frank Sinatra
- Mary Hartman, Mary Hartman ("Premiere Occasion") – Barry White (pseudonym of Robert Charles Kingston); performed by the Westway Studio Orchestra
- The Mary Tyler Moore Show ("Love Is All Around") – Sonny Curtis
- Masquerade – Crystal Gayle
- Match Game ("A Swingin' Safari") – Billy Vaughn
- Match Of The Day – Barry Stoller
- Mateo - Mateo Richerson Herrera
- Matlock – Dick DeBenedictis
- Matt Houston – Dominic Frontiere
- Maude ("And Then There's Maude") – lyrics by Alan and Marilyn Bergman by Dave Grusin; sung by Donny Hathaway
- Maverick – David Buttolph and Paul Francis Webster
- Max Headroom – Michael Hoenig
- The Max Headroom Show ("Happy Harry's High Club") – Art of Noise
- Max Monroe: Loose Cannon ("Tied Up") – Yello
- May to December ("September Song") – Kurt Weill and Maxwell Anderson, adapted by Mark Warman
- Maybe It's Me ("Everything U R") – Lindsay Pagano (first half of series); ("I'd Do Anything") – Simple Plan (second half of series)
- Mayberry R.F.D. ("Mayberry March") – Earle Hagen and Carl Brandt
- McClain's Law – James Di Pasquale
- McCloud – Glen A. Larson
- McHale's Navy – Axel Stordahl
- McMillan & Wife – Jerry Fielding
- Me and Maxx ("Is It Because of Love") – Leonore O'Malley
- Me and Mom – Amy Holland
- Me and Mrs. C. – Deborah Malone
- Meet the Wife – Dennis Wilson
- Medical Center – Lalo Schifrin
- Melangkah Di Atas Awan – Dwiki Dharmawan and Eddy D. Iskandar
- Melba ("We're Sisters") – Melba Moore
- Melrose Place – Tim Truman
- Miami Vice ("Miami Vice Theme") – Jan Hammer
- Mickey Mouse Clubhouse – They Might Be Giants
- Mickey Mouse Mixed-Up Adventures – Beau Black
- Mickey Spillane's Mike Hammer ("Harlem Nocturne") – Earle Hagen
- Midnight Caller – Brad Fiedel
- The Midnight Special ("Midnight Special") – Johnny Rivers
- Midsomer Murders – Jim Parker
- Mighty Med ("You Never Know") – Brandon Mychal Smith and Adam Hicks
- Mighty Morphin Power Rangers ("Go Go Power Rangers") – Ron Wasserman
- Mike & Molly ("I See Love") – Keb' Mo'
- Mike, Lu & Og – Igor Yuzov and Oleg Bernov
- Miles from Tomorrowland ("Way Out") – Beau Black
- Millennium – Mark Snow
- Milo Murphy's Law ("It's My World (And We're All Living in It") – "Weird Al" Yankovic
- Minder ("I Could Be So Good For You") – Gerard Kenny and Patricia Waterman, performed by Dennis Waterman
- Mira, Royal Detective – Matthew Tishler and Jeannie Lurie
- Miraculous: Tales of Ladybug & Cat Noir ("It's Ladybug") – Wendy Child, and Cash Callaway; (English theme by Noam Kaniel)
- The Misadventures of Sheriff Lobo ("Ballad of Sheriff Lobo") – Frankie Laine
- Miss Guided ("Beautiful Possibility") – Lisa Parade
- Mission: Impossible ("Theme from Mission: Impossible") – Lalo Schifrin
- Mister Ed – Jay Livingston and Ray Evans
- Mister Peepers – Bernard Green
- Mister Roberts – Frank Perkins and Stan Kenton
- Mister Rogers' Neighborhood ("Won't You Be My Neighbor") – Fred Rogers and Johnny Costa
- Mobile Suit Gundam Wing ("Just Communication") - Kow Otani
- Mobile Suit Zeta Gundam ("Mizu no Hoshi e Ai wo Komete") – Hiroko Moriguchi; written by Masao Urino and Neil Sedaka
- Mock the Week ("News of the World") – The Jam
- The Mod Squad – Earle Hagen
- Moesha ("Gotta Move") – Brandy Norwood
- Mom ("Overture" from Ruslan and Lyudmila) – performed by Mikhail Glinka
- Monday Night Football ("Heavy Action") – Johnny Pearson; ("All My Rowdy Friends Are Here for Monday Night" – Hank Williams Jr.
- The Money Programme ("Main title from The Carpetbaggers") – Elmer Bernstein, performed by Jimmy Smith
- Monk – Instrumental theme by Jeff Beal in season 1, and "It's a Jungle Out There" by Randy Newman from seasons 2–8.
- The Monkees ("(Theme From) The Monkees") - Boyce and Hart (performed by The Monkees)
- Monty Python's Flying Circus ("The Liberty Bell (march)") – John Philip Sousa played by The Band of the Grenadier Guards
- Moonlighting ("Moonlighting (theme song)") – Al Jarreau
- The Morecambe & Wise Show ("Bring Me Sunshine") – Arthur Kent
- Mork & Mindy – Perry Botkin Jr.
- The Mothers-in-Law – Jeff Alexander
- Movin' On – Merle Haggard
- Mr. Bean – Howard Goodall, adapted from "Locus iste" by Anton Bruckner) and performed by the Choir of Southwark Cathedral
- Mr. Belvedere ("According to Our New Arrival") – Leon Redbone
- Mr. Lucky – Henry Mancini
- Mr. Terrific – Gerald Fried
- ¡Mucha Lucha! – Chicos de Barrio
- Mulligan's Stew ("We Got to Stick Together") – Michael Lloyd
- The Munsters – Jack Marshall
- Muppet Babies – Hank Saroyan and Rob Walsh
- Muppet Babies (2018) – Renée Elise Goldsberry
- The Muppet Show – ("The Muppet Show Theme") – Jim Henson and Sam Pottle
- Murder One – Mike Post
- Murder, She Wrote ("JB Fletcher's Theme") – John Addison
- Murdoch Mysteries – Robert Carli
- Murphy Brown – Steve Dorff
- Murphy Law – Al Jarreau
- My Babysitter's a Vampire ("Girl Next Door") – Copperot
- My Favorite Martian – George Greeley
- My Friends Tigger & Pooh – Kay Hanley (season 1), Chloë Grace Moretz (seasons 2–3)
- My Life as a Teenage Robot – Peter Lurye
- My Little Pony: Friendship is Magic ("Friendship is Magic/My Very Best Friends") – Daniel Ingram and Steffan Andrews
- My Living Doll – George Greeley
- My Mother the Car – Paul Hampton
- My Secret Identity – Fred Mollin (S1-2), Brad MacDonald (S3)
- My Sister Eileen – Earle Hagen
- My Sister Sam ("Room Enough for Two") – Kim Carnes
- My So-Called Life – W. G. Snuffy Walden
- My Three Sons – Frank De Vol
- My Two Dads ("You Can Count on Me") – Greg Evigan
- My Wife Next Door – Dennis Wilson
- My World and Welcome to It – Warren Barker and Danny Arnold (composers); Paul Beaver and Bernard Krause (co-composers, electronic music performance)
- Mystery Science Theater 3000 – seasons 0–5 Joel Hodgson, seasons 5–10 Michael J. Nelson
- N.Y.P.D. – Charles Gross
- Naked City ("This is the Naked City") – George Duning (1958–59); ("Somewhere in the Night") – Billy May (1959–60); ("The {New} Naked City Theme") – Nelson Riddle (1960–61)
- Name That Tune - Tommy Oliver
- The Nancy Walker Show ("Nancy's Blues") – Marvin Hamlisch by Alan and Marilyn Bergman (performed by Nancy Walker)
- The Nanny ("The Nanny Named Fran") – Ann Hampton Callaway (performed with Liz Callaway)
- Nanny and the Professor ("Nanny") – Addrisi Brothers
- Nash Bridges ("I Got a Friend in You") – Eddie Jobson
- Nashville 99 – Jerry Reed
- Nasty Boys ("Nasty") – Lisa Keith
- Nationwide – ("The Good Word") – Johnny Scott
- NBA on NBC ("Roundball Rock") – John Tesh
- NBA on TBS ("Higher Ground") - Run DMC
- The NBC Mystery Movie – Henry Mancini
- NBC Nightly News ("The Mission") – John Williams
- NBC Olympic broadcasts ("Olympic Fanfare and Theme") - John Williams
- NBC Sunday Night Football ("Waiting All Day for Sunday Night") – Carrie Underwood
- NCAA on CBS Sports – Bob Christianson and Trevor Rabin; ("One Shining Moment") - David Barrett
- NCIS – Numeriklab
- NCIS: Los Angeles – James S. Levine
- NCIS: New Orleans ("Boom Boom") – John Lee Hooker; performed by Big Head Todd and the Monsters
- Neighbours – Tony Hatch and Jackie Trent, performed by Barry Crocker (nine variant versions since 1988)
- Neon Genesis Evangelion ("A Cruel Angel's Thesis") – Yoko Takahashi
- Neon Rider – Bill Henderson
- The New Adventures of Winnie the Pooh ("Pooh Bear (The New Adventures of Winnie the Pooh theme song)") – Steve Nelson and Thom Sharp
- New Attitude – Sheryl Lee Ralph
- The New Avengers – Laurie Johnson
- The New Gidget ("One in a Million") – Marek Norman
- New Girl ("Hey Girl") – Zooey Deschanel
- The New Scooby-Doo Movies – Hoyt Curtin
- The New Statesman – Alan Hawkshaw, based on the Promenade from Pictures at an Exhibition by Russian composer Modest Mussorgsky
- New Tricks ("It's Alright") – Mike Moran, composed by Dennis Waterman
- The New WKRP in Cincinnati – Tom Wells
- Newhart – Henry Mancini
- The Newlywed Game - Chuck Barris
- NewsRadio – Mike Post
- NFL on CBS ("Posthumus Zone") – E.S. Posthumus
- NFL on ESPN ("Heavy Action") – Johnny Pearson; ("In the Air Tonight") – Phil Collins featuring Chris Stapleton, Cindy Blackman Santana and Snoop Dogg
- NFL on Fox – Scott Schreer
- Night Court – Jack Elliott
- Night Gallery – Billy Goldenberg (pilot) Gil Mellé (seasons 1–2) and Eddie Sauter (season 3)
- Night Heat – B. J. Cook and Domenic Troiano
- Ni Hao, Kai-Lan – Matt Mahaffey
- Nina's World – Daniel Ingram
- Nip/Tuck ("A Perfect Lie") – The Engine Room
- Norm ("Too Bad") – Doug and the Slugs
- Not in Front of the Children – Ronnie Hazlehurst
- Not Necessarily the News ("Motherless Children") - Eric Clapton (seasons 1-2); "Hooray for the City" - Jack Mack and the Heart Attack (seasons 3-8))
- Not the Nine O'Clock News – Howard Goodall
- Now You See It ("Chump Change") - Quincy Jones and Bill Cosby
- Nurse Jackie – Lisa Coleman and Wendy Melvoin
- NYPD Blue – Mike Post

== O – P ==
- The O.C. ("California") – Phantom Planet
- The Oblongs – They Might Be Giants
- The Odd Couple – Neal Hefti
- Odd Man Out – Max Harris
- The Office (UK) ("Handbags and Gladrags") arranged by Big George
- The Office (US) – Jay Ferguson (performed by The Scrantones)
- Oh Baby – Performed by Jimmy Beavers
- Oh Doctor Beeching! – based on "Oh! Mr Porter" by Thomas and George Le Brunn, performed by Su Pollard
- OK K.O.! Let's Be Heroes ("Let's Watch the Show") – Jake Kaufman
- Oliver Beene ("The Future Is Now") – The Solids
- Olympics on NBC
- Once Upon a Time – Mark Isham
- One Day at a Time ("This Is It") – Jeff Barry and Nancy Barry
- One Day at a Time (2017) ("This Is It") – Gloria Estefan
- One Tree Hill ("I Don't Want to Be") – Gavin DeGraw
- Only Fools and Horses ("Only Fools and Horses"/ "Hooky Street") – written and performed by John Sullivan, arranged by Ronnie Hazlehurst
- Only When I Laugh – Ken Jones
- One Foot in the Grave – Written, composed and performed by Eric Idle
- On the Buses – Tony Russell
- Open All Hours – Max Harris, based on "Alice, Where Art Thou?", written by Joseph Ascher
- Open House – John Beasley and John Vester
- Orange Is the New Black ("You've Got Time") – Regina Spektor
- The O'Reilly Factor – Scott Schreer
- Orphan Black – Two Fingers
- Otherworld - Sylvester Levay
- Our Miss Brooks – Wilbur Hatch
- Out of the Box ("Out of the Box Opening Theme") – Peter Lurye; ("Until We Meet Again (Goodbye song") – Billy Straus
- Out of This World (Contemporary version of "Swinging on a Star") – performed by Kevin Kiner
- The Outer Limits (1963 TV series) – Dominic Frontiere (1) Harry Lubin (2)
- The Outer Limits (1995 TV series) – Mark Mancina and John Van Tongeren
- The Outsider – Pete Rugolo
- The Owl House – T. J. Hill
- Ozzy & Drix – performed by Kenneth Gray
- P.S. I Luv U – Greg Evigan and Suzanne Fountain
- Pacific Blue ("Just Another Day in L.A.") – Christopher Franke
- Pair of Kings ("Top of the World") – Mitchel Musso and Doc Shaw
- Pajanimals ("We're the Pajanimals") – Michael and Patty Silversher, opening theme; ("La La Lullaby") – Michael and Patty Silversher, ending theme
- The Paper Chase ("The First Years") – Seals and Crofts
- The Parkers ("We're The Parkers") – Countess Vaughn
- Party Girl ("It's My Life") – Carole Bayer Sager and Oliver Leiber
- Party of Five ("Closer to Free") – BoDeans
- The Partridge Family ("C'mon, Get Happy") – Wes Farrell, Diane Hilderbrand and Danny Janssen (performed by The Partridge Family)
- Passions ("Breathe") – theme song composed by John Henry Kreitler and Wes Boatman, sung by Jane French
- The Patty Duke Show ("Cousins") – Sid Ramin and Robert Wells (performed by The Skip-Jacks)
- PAW Patrol – Scott Krippayne
- PB&J Otter – ("Oodelay-o") – Dan Sawyer and Fred Newman
- Peep and the Big Wide World – Taj Mahal
- Peep Show – Daniel Pemberton (Series 1), ("Flagpole Sitta") – Harvey Danger (Season 2–9)
- Penn Zero: Part-Time Hero – Ryan Shore and Beau Black
- The People's Court ("The Big One") – Alan Tew
- Peppa Pig – Julian Nott
- Perfect Strangers ("Nothing's Gonna Stop Me Now") – David Pomeranz
- Perry Mason ("Park Avenue Beat") – Fred Steiner
- The Persuaders! – John Barry
- Peter Gunn ("Peter Gunn (song)") – Henry Mancini
- Petticoat Junction – Paul Henning and Curt Massey
- Phenom ("The Promise and the Prize") – Carly Simon
- Phil of the Future – Loren Ellis and the Drew Davis Band
- The Phil Silvers Show – John Strauss
- Phineas and Ferb ("Today Is Gonna Be a Great Day") – Bowling for Soup
- Phyllis – Stan Daniels
- Pingu (“Pingu Dance”) – David Hasselhoff
- The Pink Panther Show – Doug Goodwin (three themes)
- The Pink Panther Theme – Henry Mancini
- Pinky Dinky Doo – Joey Levine and Taylor McLam
- Pistols 'n' Petticoats – composed and written by Jack Elliott and George Tibbles, performed by Elliott and Stanley Wilson
- The PJs - George Clinton and Quincy Jones III
- Planet of the Apes – Lalo Schifrin
- Playboy After Dark ("Playboy's Theme") – Cy Coleman
- Please Don't Eat the Daisies – Jeff Alexander
- Pokémon: Indigo League – Jason Paige
- Police Squad! ("Theme from Police Squad!") – Ira Newborn
- Police Story – Jerry Goldsmith
- Police Woman – Morton Stevens
- Polka Dot Door ("The Polka Dot Door") – Dodi Robb and Pat Patterson
- Porridge (1974 TV Series) – Max Harris
- Postcards from Buster ("Hey Buster") – Wyclef Jean featuring 3 on 3
- Potter – Ronnie Hazlehurst
- The Powerpuff Girls – opening theme composed by James L. Venable and closing theme performed by BiS
- The Powers of Matthew Star – Michel Rubini and Denny Jaeger, later version by Johnny Harris (7 eps.)
- The Powers That Be – Stephen Bishop
- PrankStars ("Look On Your Face") – Mitchel Musso
- The Pretender – Velton Ray Bunch and Mark Leggett
- Pretty Little Liars ("Secret") – The Pierces
- The Price Is Right – Edd Kalehoff
- Princesses ("Some Day My Prince Will Come") – The Roches
- Prison Break – Ramin Djawadi
- Prisoner ("On the Inside") – Lynne Hamilton
- The Prisoner – Ron Grainer
- Private Benjamin ("Judy's Theme") – Barry De Vorzon, Dennis McCarthy and George Tipton
- The Professionals – Laurie Johnson
- Profiler – Angelo Badalamenti
- The Protectors ("Avenues and Alleyways") – Mitch Murray and Peter Callender, performed by Tony Christie
- The Proud Family – Solange Knowles featuring Destiny's Child
- Providence ("In My Life) – composed by John Lennon and Paul McCartney; (Performed by Chantal Kreviazuk)
- The Pruitts of Southampton – Vic Mizzy; (performed by Phyllis Diller)
- Psych ("I Know, You Know") – The Friendly Indians
- Pucca ("Love Recipe") – Yoon Joo-Hyeon and Kim-wook
- Puella Magi Madoka Magica ("Connect") – ClariS
- Punky Brewster ("Every Time I Turn Around") – Gary Portnoy
- The Pursuit of Happiness – Mendy Lee

== Q – R ==
- QI – Howard Goodall
- Quantum Leap – Mike Post
- Quark – Perry Botkin Jr.
- Queen of Swords ("Behind the Mask") – composed by Spencer Proffer and Steve Plunkett (BMI); performed by José Feliciano
- Queer as Folk ("Spunk") – Greek Buck (season 1–3); ("Cue the Pulse to Begin") – Burnside Project (seasons 4–5)
- Queer Duck – RuPaul
- The Quick Draw McGraw Show – Hoyt Curtin
- Quiller – Richard Denton & Martin Cook
- Quincy, M.E. – Glen A. Larson and Stu Phillips
- The Raccoons ("Run with Us") – Lisa Lougheed
- Rab C. Nesbitt – David McNiven
- Rainbow – Telltale
- Randall and Hopkirk (Deceased) – Edwin Astley
- Randall and Hopkirk – Nina Persson & David Arnold
- Rapunzel's Tangled Adventure ("Wind in My Hair") – Mandy Moore; ("More of Me") – Natasha Bedingfield
- The Rat Patrol – Dominic Frontiere
- Raven's Home – Andy Love, Joacim Persson and Johan Alkenäs
- Rawhide – Ned Washington and Dimitri Tiomkin; performed by Frankie Laine
- The Real Ghostbusters ("Ghostbusters") – Ray Parker Jr.
- Real Stories of the Highway Patrol ("I'm Looking Out for You") – Belize; composed by Larry Brown and Chuck Barth
- Reba ("I'm a Survivor") – Reba McEntire
- The Rebel ("Ballad of Johnny Yuma") – Richard Markowitz and Andrew J. Fenady; performed by Johnny Cash
- Red Dwarf ("In the Sun") – Howard Goodall, performed by Jenna Russell
- The Red Skelton Show ("Holiday For Strings") – David Rose
- The Redd Foxx Show ("Heart of the City") – Kool & the Gang
- Reilly, Ace of Spies ("Romance" from The Gadfly Suite; composed by Dmitri Shostakovich, although it is credited to Harry Rabinowitz
- Remington Steele – Henry Mancini
- Renegade - Mike Post
- Rescue Me ("C'mon C'mon") – The Von Bondies
- Rhoda – Billy Goldenberg
- The Riches – Toby Chu
- Richard Diamond, Private Detective – Frank DeVol (Seasons 1 & 2); Pete Rugolo (Season 3); Richard Shores (Season 4)
- Richie Brockelman, Private Eye ("School's Out") – Stephen Geyer and Bill Pederson
- Ricki Lake – John Benitez
- Ridiculousness ("Uncontrollable Urge") – Devo
- The Rifleman – Herschel Burke Gilbert
- Ripcord – Judith Pines
- Ripley's Believe It or Not! – Henry Mancini
- Ripping Yarns ("Fanfare from the ‘Facade Suite No. 2") by William Walton, conducted by Louis Frémaux, performed by the City of Birmingham Orchestra
- Riptide – Mike Post and Pete Carpenter
- Rise of the Teenage Mutant Ninja Turtles – Matt Mahaffey
- Rising Damp – Dennis Wilson
- The Road Runner Show – Barbara Cameron
- Robin's Nest – Richard O'Sullivan and Brian Bennett
- RoboCop ("Future to this Life") – Joe Walsh and Lita Ford
- Roc ("God Bless the Child") – Jerry Lawson (episodes 1–39), composed by Fred Thaler; ("Live Your Life Today") - En Vogue (episodes 40–72), composed by Denzil Foster & Thomas McElroy
- The Rocketeer ("Rocketeer to the Rescue") – Tammy Infusino
- The Rockford Files ("The Rockford Files (theme)") – Mike Post and Pete Carpenter
- Rocko's Modern Life – The B-52s and Tom Kenny (S2–4)
- The Rookies – Elmer Bernstein
- Room 222 – Jerry Goldsmith
- The Ropers – Joe Raposo
- Roseanne – W. G. Snuffy Walden (later added with lyrics sung by Blues Traveler)
- Rosie – Ronnie Hazlehurst, performed by Paul Greenwood
- The Rosie O'Donnell Show – John McDaniel
- Roswell ("Here with Me") – Dido
- The Rousters ("Tough Enough") – Ronnie Milsap
- Route 66 – Nelson Riddle
- The Roy Rogers Show ("Happy Trails") – Roy Rogers and Dale Evans
- The Royle Family ("Half The World Away") – Oasis
- Rubbadubbers ("Here Come the Rubbadubbers") – (KicK Production, performed by the main cast)
- The Rubbish World of Dave Spud – Basement Jaxx
- Ruby Gloom – Jeen O'Brien
- Rugrats – Bob Mothersbaugh and Mark Mothersbaugh
- Rules of Engagement ("How Many Ways") – Señor Happy
- Rumpole of the Bailey – Joseph Horovitz
- Rutland Weekend Television – Neil Innes
- Ryan's Hope ("Here's to Us") – Carey Gold

== S – T ==
- S.W.A.T. ("Theme from S.W.A.T.") – Rhythm Heritage (composed by Barry De Vorzon)
- Sabrina: The Animated Series ("Sabrina (She'll Bewitch Ya)") – B*Witched
- Sabrina's Secret Life ("Who's Makin' Magic?") – Jean-Michel Guirao
- Sagwa, the Chinese Siamese Cat – Judith Henderson
- Sailor Moon ("Moonlight Densetsu") – DALI (seasons 1 and 2), Moon Lips (seasons 3 and 4); composed by Tetsuya Komoro
- The Saint – Edwin Astley (B/W episodes); Edwin Astley, Leslie Charteris (color episodes)
- Sam & Cat ("Just Fine") – Michael Corcoran
- Samurai Jack – Will.i.am
- The Sandy Duncan Show ("The Kind of Girl She Is") – Alan and Marilyn Bergman
- Sanford and Son ("The Streetbeater") – Quincy Jones
- Saturday Night Live – Howard Shore
- Saved by the Bell – Scott Gale
- Saved by the Bell: The College Years ("Standing on the Edge of Tomorrow") – Jonathan Wolff
- Scarecrow and Mrs. King – Arthur B. Rubinstein
- School of Rock! ("Are You Ready to Rock?") – School of Rock
- SciGirls – Steve D'Angelo, Terry Tompkins and Jeff Morrow for Eggplant
- Scooby-Doo, Where Are You! – David Mook and Ben Raleigh (performed first season by Larry Markes; second season by Austin Roberts)
- Scrubs ("Superman") – Lazlo Bane (seasons 1–8), WAZ (season 9)
- Sea Hunt – David Rose (as "Ray Llewellyn")
- SEC on CBS – Lloyd Landesman
- The Second Hundred Years – George Duning
- Seinfeld – Jonathan Wolff
- The Sentimental Agent – Ivor Slaney
- Sesame Street ("Can You Tell Me How to Get to Sesame Street?") – Joe Raposo, Jon Stone, and Bruce Hart; performed by The Kids
- Sex and the City – Douglas J. Cuomo and Tom Findlay
- Shaft ("Theme from Shaft") – Isaac Hayes
- Shake It Up – Selena Gomez
- Shameless ("The Luck You Got") – The High Strung
- Sheep in the Big City – Julian Harris
- Sherlock – David Arnold and Michael Price
- Sherlock Holmes (1984 TV Series) – Patrick Gowers
- Sheriff Callie's Wild West – Mandy Moore
- Shimmer and Shine – Melanie Fontana; composed by Joachim Svare and Joleen Belle
- Shining Time Station – Kevin Roth
- Sid the Science Kid – Dena Diamond and Mike Himelstein
- Sigmund and the Sea Monsters ("Friends") – Johnny Whitaker
- Sihina Wasanthayak (Sirasa TV) ("Sansara Purudada Mey") – Dinesh Subasinghe
- Silk Stalkings - Mike Post
- Silver Spoons ("Together") – Rik Howard and Bob Wirth, performed by Ron Dante
- Simon & Simon – Barry De Vorzon and Michael Towers, ("Best of Friends") – closing theme by The Thrasher Brothers (1st season)
- The Simpsons ("The Simpsons Theme") – Danny Elfman
- Sir Francis Drake – Ivor Slaney
- Sister Kate ("Maybe an Angel") – Amy Grant
- Six Feet Under – Thomas Newman
- The Six Million Dollar Man – Oliver Nelson
- The Sky at Night ("Pelleas et Melisande, Op. 46 1. At the Castle Gate") – Jean Sibelius
- Sliders – Mark Mothersbaugh (Season 1), Anthony Marinelli and Stephen Graziano (Seasons 2 and 3), Danny Lux (Seasons 4 and 5)
- Small Wonder ("She's a Small Wonder") – Ron Alexander, Howard Leeds and Diane Leslie
- Smallville ("Save Me") – Remy Zero
- The Smothers Brothers Comedy Hour ("The Brothers Theme") – Mason Williams and Nancy Ames
- Snoops ("Curiosity") – Ray Charles
- Snoops (1999) ("One Way or Another") – Blondie
- So Random! – Brandon Mychal Smith
- So Weird ("In the Darkness") – Mackenzie Phillips
- Soap – George Tipton
- Sofia the First – Ariel Winter
- Solid Gold – Theme song performed by Dionne Warwick (Seasons 1 and 4) and Marilyn McCoo (Seasons 2–3, 5–8)
- Some Mothers Do 'Ave Em – Ronnie Hazlehurst
- The Sonny & Cher Comedy Hour ("The Beat Goes On") – Sonny Bono and Cher
- Sonny with a Chance ("So Far, So Great") – Demi Lovato
- The Sooty Show – Alan Braden
- The Sopranos ("Woke Up This Morning") – Alabama 3
- Sorry! – Gaynor Colbourn and Hugh Wisdom
- Soul Food (The Way Love Goes") – Al Green (season 1 solo); Al Green with Sy Smith (seasons 2–5)
- Soul Train ("TSOP (The Sound of Philadelphia)") – MFSB and The Three Degrees
- South of Sunset ("Call on Me") – Glenn Frey
- South Park – Primus
- Space: 1999 – Barry Gray (Series One), Derek Wadsworth (Series Two)
- Spartacus – Joseph LoDuca
- Special Agent Oso – Joseph Gian
- Speed Racer ("Go Speed Racer Go") - Nobuyoshi Kishobe, English lyrics by Peter Fernandez
- Spenser: For Hire – Steve Dorff and Larry Herbstritt
- Spider-Man ("Your Friendly Neighborhood Spider-Man") – Paul Francis Webster and J. Robert Harris
- Spin City – Shelly Palmer (seasons 1—4), Spin Doctors (season 2―4), and Danny Pelfrey (seasons 5―6)
- SpongeBob SquarePants – Patrick Pinney
- SportsCenter – Annie Roboff
- Square Pegs – The Waitresses
- St. Elsewhere – Dave Grusin
- Stagecoach West – Bud & Travis
- Stanley – Baha Men
- Star Cops ("It Won't be Easy") – Justin Hayward
- Star Trek ("Theme from Star Trek") – Alexander Courage
- Star Trek: Deep Space Nine – Dennis McCarthy
- Star Trek: Enterprise ("Faith of the Heart") – performed by [[Russell Watson]] / ("Archer's Theme") – Ending piece by Dennis McCarthy
- Star Trek: The Next Generation – Jerry Goldsmith, Alexander Courage; arrangement by Dennis McCarthy
- Star Trek: Voyager – Jerry Goldsmith
- Star vs. the Forces of Evil ("I'm from Another Dimension") – Brad Breeck
- Stargate Atlantis – Joel Goldsmith
- Stargate SG-1 – Joel Goldsmith
- Stargate Universe – Joel Goldsmith
- Starsky & Hutch – first season by Lalo Schifrin, revised theme: ("Gotcha") – second and fourth seasons by Tom Scott and third season by Mark Snow
- Star Wars Forces of Destiny – Ryan Shore
- Station Zero – ("We're On Station Zero") – Randall Lawrence; performed by Tekomin "Tek" Williams, Carlito Rodriguez, Riggs Morales, Quanzilla
- Stay Lucky – John Powell, performed by Dennis Waterman
- Step by Step – Jesse Frederick and Teresa James
- Steptoe and Son ("Old Ned") – Ron Grainer
- Steven Universe ("We Are the Crystal Gems") – Zach Callison, Estelle, Michaela Dietz, Deedee Magno Hall, Tom Scharpling (Full version only); ("Love Like You") – Rebecca Sugar
- Still Open All Hours – Max Harris, based on "Alice, Where Art Thou?", written by Joseph Ascher
- Still Standing ("You Make Me Happy") – Will Hoge
- Stingray (1964) ("Aqua Marina") – Gary Miller
- Stingray – Mike Post
- The Stockard Channing Show ("Stockard's Theme") – Delaney Bramlett
- Strange Report – Roger Webb
- The Strange World of Gurney Slade – Max Harris
- Stranger Things – Kyle Dixon and Michael Stein
- Street Hawk ("Le Parc") – Tangerine Dream
- Street Justice – Lawrence Shragge
- The Streets of San Francisco – Patrick Williams
- Stuck in the Middle ("Stuck with You") – Sonus
- Suburgatory ("Pleasant Nightmare") – Alih Jey
- Suddenly Susan ("Nothing on Me") – Shawn Colvin
- Sue Thomas: F.B.Eye ("Who I Am") – Jessica Andrews
- Sugar and Spice – Leslie Pearl, Paul Solovay and Susan Spiegel Solovay
- Sugar Time! ("Girls, Girls, Girls") – Barbi Benton
- The Suite Life of Zack & Cody ("Here I Am") – Loren Ellis and the Drew Davis Band
- The Suite Life on Deck ("Livin' the Suite Life") – Steve Rushton
- Suits ("Greenback Boogie") - Ima Robot
- Sunday Dinner ("Love Begins at Home") – Kim Carnes
- Super Dave - Jimmy Dale
- Super Fun Night ("Don't Stop Me Now") – written by Freddie Mercury; performed by the cast
- The Super Mario Bros. Super Show! ("Mario Brothers Rap") and "Do the Mario") – performed by Lou Albano as Mario
- Super Mario World – Mark Mothersbaugh
- Super Robot Monkey Team Hyperforce Go! – Polysics
- Superjail! ("Commin' Home") – Cheeseburger; ("Rubber Bullets") – 10cc (pilot episode)
- Supernatural – Jay Gruska
- Superstore – Mateo Messina
- Super Why! ("Who's Got the Power?") – Eggplant, LLC
- Surfside 6 – Mack David and Jerry Livingston
- Survivor ("Ancient Voices") – Russ Landau
- Sweet Valley High – Shuki Levy, Haim Saban and Yuval Ron
- Switch – Glen A. Larson
- Sydney ("Finish What Ya Started") – Van Halen
- Sydney to the Max ("Stay the Same") – Ruth Righi and Dan Conklin
- Sykes – Ken Jones
- T.H.E. Cat – Lalo Schifrin
- T. J. Hooker – Mark Snow
- Tabitha ("It Could Be Magic") – Lisa Hartman Black
- Taggart ("No Mean City") – Maggie Bell
- Taina ("Gonna Be a Star") – Christina Vidal
- TaleSpin ("Spin It!") – Michael and Patty Silversher
- Tales From The Crypt – Danny Elfman
- The Tall Man – Juan García Esquivel
- Tammy – Jay Livingston and Ray Evans
- The Tammy Grimes Show – John Williams
- Tamron Hall ("Shine") – Fantasia (season 1–5); ("Good Life") - The Baylor Project (season 6)
- Tarzán – Laurence Juber (1991–92); Robert O. Ragland (1992–94)
- Taxi ("Angela") – Bob James
- Team Umizoomi – P.T. Walkley
- Teech ("Teach Me") – B.B. King
- Teen Titans – Puffy AmiYumi
- Teen Titans Go! ("Teen Titans Theme (Mix Master Mike Remix)") – Puffy AmiYumi
- Teenage Mutant Ninja Turtles – Chuck Lorre and Dennis C. Brown
- Teenage Mutant Ninja Turtles (2012) – Sebastian Evans
- TekWar ("Real or Not") Warren Zevon; composed by Fred Mollin
- Teletubbies ("Teletubbies say "Eh-oh!"") – Andrew McCrorie-Shand
- Terrahawks ("Living in the 21st Century") – Kate Kestrel
- Test Match Special ("Soul Limbo") – Booker T. & the M.G.'s
- The Texas Wheelers ("Illegal Smile") – John Prine
- That '70s Show ("In the Street") – Big Star as performed by Todd Griffin season 1; Cheap Trick (seasons 2―8)
- That '80s Show ("Eighties") – Killing Joke
- That Girl – Earle Hagen and Sam Denoff
- That's My Bush! – DVDA
- That's My Mama – Lamont Dozier
- That's So Raven – Raven-Symoné, Orlando Brown and Anneliese van der Pol
- That's Your Funeral – Ronnie Hazlehurst
- Then Churchill Said to Me – Ronnie Hazlehurst, performed by Anne Shelton
- The Thin Blue Line – Howard Goodall
- Third Watch ("Keep Hope Alive") – The Crystal Method
- This Week in Baseball:
  - Opening theme: "Jet Set" – Mike Vickers (previously used for the 1974–75 version of Jackpot)
  - Closing theme: "Gathering Crowds" – John Scott
- Thomas & Friends – Mike O'Donnell (seasons 1 – 7), Engine roll call – Ed Welch (Seasons 8 – 21), Big World! Big Adventures! – Kevin Roberge (Seasons 22 – 24)
- Three Up, Two Down – Ronnie Hazlehurst
- Three Wishes ("Believe") – Amy Grant
- Three's a Crowd ("Side by Side") – music by Michael Lloyd; lyrics by Al Kasha, Joel Hirschhorn, Don Nicholl & Michael Lloyd
- Three's Company ("Come and Knock on Our Door") – written by Joe Raposo and Don Nicholl; performed by Ray Charles and Julia Rinker
- The Thrills ("Extraordinary") – Mandy Moore
- Throb – Diana Canova and The Nylons
- The Thundermans ("Livin' a Double Life") – Kira Kosarin and Jack Griffo
- Till Death Do Us Part – Dennis Wilson
- Time of Your Life ("I've Just Seen a Face") – BoDeans
- The Time Tunnel – John Williams
- Timon & Pumbaa ("Hakuna Matata") – music by Elton John; lyrics by Tim Rice
- Titans ("6 Underground") – Sneaker Pimps
- To the Manor Born – Ronnie Hazlehurst
- The Tomorrow People – Dudley Simpson
- Today (Scherzo for Today") – John Williams
- Tomorrow's World – Johnny Dankworth
- The Tonight Show Starring Johnny Carson ("Johnny's Theme") – Paul Anka
- Too Close for Comfort – Johnny Mandel
- Top Cat ("The Most Effectual Top Cat") – Hoyt Curtin
- Top Gear ("Jessica") – The Allman Brothers Band
- Top of the Heap ("Puttin' On the Ritz") – Kenny Yarbrough
- Top of the Pops – ("Whole Lotta Love") – performed by Top of the Pops orchestra & CCS
- Torchwood – Murray Gold
- The Torkelsons ("A New Day Promises") – The Judds
- Total Drama Island – ("I Wanna Be Famous") – Graeme Cornies and Dawna Toews
- Touch – Lisa Coleman and Wendy Melvoin
- A Touch of Frost – Barbara Thompson and John Hiseman
- Touched by an Angel ("I'll Walk With You") – performed by Della Reese
- Tour of Duty ("Paint It Black") – The Rolling Stones, composed by Joseph Conlan
- Tracey Takes On... ("They Don't Know About Us") – Kirsty MacColl
- The Tracey Ullman Show ("You're Thinking Right") – performed and composed by George Clinton
- Trapper John, M.D. – John Carl Parker
- The Travels of Jaimie McPheeters – Leigh Harline and Jerry Winn
- The Trials of O'Brien – Sid Ramin
- The Trials of Rosie O'Neill ("I Wish I Knew") – Melissa Manchester
- Tripping the Rift – Mario Sévigny
- Trollz ("It's a Hair Thing") – Haim
- Tropical Heat ("Any Way the Wind Blows") - Fred Mollin
- Tru Calling ("Somebody Help Me") – Full Blown Rose
- True Blood ("Bad Things") – Jace Everett
- True Jackson, VP ("Change It Up") – Keke Palmer
- Tweenies – ("Hey, Hey, Are You Ready to Play?") – Liz Kitchen, Graham Pike and Barrie Bignold
- The Twilight Zone – Bernard Herrmann (Season 1); Marius Constant (Seasons 2–5)
- Twin Peaks ("Falling") – Angelo Badalamenti
- Two and a Half Men ("Manly Men") – Lee Aronsohn, Grant Geissman, and Chuck Lorre; performed by Charlie Sheen, Jon Cryer, Angus T. Jones and Ashton Kutcher
- The Two Ronnies – Ronnie Hazlehurst

== U – Z ==
- UFO – Barry Gray
- The Ugliest Girl in Town – Howard Greenfield and Helen Miller; (sung by Will-O-Bees)
- Ugly Betty – Jeff Beal
- Uncle Buck – Ronnie Milsap
- Under Cover – Cameron Allan
- Underdog – W. Watts Biggers, Chet Stover, Joe Harris, Treadwell Covington
- Unhitched ("Hey") – Gilmor
- University Challenge ("College Boy") – Derek New
- Unsolved Mysteries – Michael Boyd and Gary Remal Malkin
- Unsub – Mike Post
- Up Pompeii! – Alan Braden
- Upstairs, Downstairs – Alexander Faris
- V: The Series – Dennis McCarthy
- V ("Uprising") – Muse
- V.I.P. – Frankie Blue
- Vega$ – Dominic Frontiere
- Veronica Mars ("We Used To Be Friends") – The Dandy Warhols
- Veronica's Closet ("She's Got Everything") – Jeffrey Osborne (seasons 1 & 2); ("Bodyrock") – Moby
- A Very Peculiar Practice ("We Love You") – written by Dave Greenslade, performed by Elkie Brooks
- VeggieTales – Mike Nawrocki, Phil Vischer, Lisa Vischer and Kurt Heinecke
- The Vicar of Dibley – Howard Goodall, adaption of Psalm 23, performed by the choir of Christ Church Cathedral, Oxford
- Victorious ("Make It Shine") – Victoria Justice
- The View ("World's Gone Crazy") – Mary J. Blige (seasons 20–24); ("For My Girls") – Brandy Norwood and Nicole Scherzinger (seasons 25–27); ("This Version") – Leona Lewis (season 28–present)
- Vikings ("If I Had a Heart") – Karin Dreijer
- Violetta ("En Mi Mundo") – Martina Stoessel
- Viper – Jay Ferguson (season 1) and Eddie Jobson (season 2–3)
- The Virginian ("Lonesome Tree") – Percy Faith (seasons 1–8) and Ennio Morricone (season 9)
- Vision On – ("Accrohe Toi Caroline") – Claude Vasori
- Voyage to the Bottom of the Sea ("The Seaview Theme") – Paul Sawtell
- W5 (during the 1970s and 1980s) ("Fool's Overture") – Supertramp
- The Wackiest Ship in the Army – Howard Greenfield, Jack Keller and Helen Miller
- Wagon Train – Jerome Moross
- Walker, Texas Ranger ("Eyes of the Ranger") – Chuck Norris
- The Walking Dead – Bear McCreary
- Wallace & Gromit's Cracking Contraptions – Julian Nott
- Wallace & Gromit's World of Invention – Julian Nott
- Wall Street Week ("TWX in 12 Bars") – Donald Swartz
- Walt Disney anthology television series – Richard M. Sherman and Robert B. Sherman
- The Waltons – Jerry Goldsmith
- Watching ("What Does He See in Me?") - written by Charles Hart, performed by Emma Wray
- Watership Down ("Bright Eyes") – Art Garfunkel
- The Wayans Bros. ("Gimme A High-Five (The We're Brothers Song)") – Alan Cohn, ("Electric Relaxation") – A Tribe Called Quest (seasons 1―2), instrumental themes (season 3―5)
- Wayside ("Fly by the Wayside") – Skye Sweetnam
- WCW Monday Nitro ("Monday Night Nitro Theme/Mean Streets") – Jonathan Elias
- WCW Saturday Night ("Dynamics") – Richard Harvey
- WCW Thunder ("Out to Lunch/Thunder") – Steve Everitt, ("Here Comes the Pain (instrumental)") – Slayer
- We Bare Bears ("We'll Be There") – Estelle
- Webster ("Then Came You") – Steve Nelson and Gail Loparta
- Weeds ("Little Boxes") – Malvina Reynolds
- Weekend World ("Nantucket Sleighride")
- Weird Science – Oingo Boingo
- Welcome Back, Kotter ("Welcome Back") – John Sebastian
- Welcome to the Wayne – Anna Waronker and Charlotte Caffey
- Wendy and Me ("Wendy") – Ervin Drake
- The West Wing – W. G. Snuffy Walden
- What a Country! ("I Want to Be an American") – Dick DeBenedictis
- What I Like About You ("What I Like About You (The Romantics song)") - Lillix; Philip Steir (remix version; seasons 2–4)
- Whatever Happened to the Likely Lads? – Mike Hugg and Ian La Frenais
- Whatever Happened to... Robot Jones? – The Invisible Car
- What's Happening!! – Henry Mancini
- What's New, Scooby-Doo? – Simple Plan
- Wheel Of Fortune ("Changing Keys") – Merv Griffin
- When Things Were Rotten – Lee Adams and Charles Strouse
- Where in the World Is Carmen Sandiego? – Rockapella
- Where in Time Is Carmen Sandiego? – The Engine Crew
- Whiplash ("Whiplash") – Words and Music by Edwin Astley; sung by Frank Ifield
- Whirlybirds – William Loose and John Seely
- The White Shadow – Mike Post and Pete Carpenter
- Who Wants to Be a Millionaire – Keith Strachan and Matthew Strachan
- Who's the Boss? ("Brand New Life") – Larry Carlton and Robert Kraft; performed as an Larry Weiss (1984–86), Steve Wariner (1986–89) and Jonathan Wolff (1989–92)
- Who's Watching the Kids? – Charles Bernstein
- Whoops Apocalypse – Nigel Hess
- Wide World of Sports – Charles Fox
- Wild Kratts ("Gonna Go Wild Kratts") – Sterling Jarvis
- Wild West C.O.W.-Boys of Moo Mesa – Billy Dean and Verlon Thompson
- The Wild Wild West – Richard Markowitz
- Will & Grace – Jonathan Wolff
- The Wind in the Willows – Keith Hopwood and Malcolm Rowe
- Wings ("Piano Sonata No. 20 in A Major, D. 959, Rondo: Allegretto") – Franz Schubert
- WIOU – Gary Chang
- The Wire ("Way Down in the Hole") – The Blind Boys of Alabama (season 1), Tom Waits (season 2), The Neville Brothers (season 3), DoMaJe (season 4), Steve Earle (season 5)
- Wiseguy – Mike Post
- Wish You Were Here...? ("The Carnival") - Gordon Giltrap
- The Wizard of Odds – Alan Thicke
- Wizards of Waverly Place ("Everything Is Not What It Seems") – Selena Gomez
- WKRP in Cincinnati – Steve Carlisle
- Wolf – Artie Kane
- Wolfblood ("A Promise That I Keep") – Lisa Knapp (series 1–3), ("Running with the Wolves") – Aurora (series 4-present)
- Wonder Woman – Charles Fox and Norman Gimbel
- Wonder Pets! – Jeffrey Lesser
- The Wonder Years ("With a Little Help from My Friends") – John Lennon and Paul McCartney; performed by Joe Cocker
- Wonderbug – Jimmie Haskell
- WordGirl – ("Word Up, It's WordGirl!") – Steve D'Angelo and Terry Tompkins
- WordWorld – Billy Straus
- Working Girl ("Let the River Run") – Carly Simon
- Working It Out – John Loeffler and Ralph Schuckett
- The World at War – Carl Davis
- World of Sport – Don Harper
- The Worst Witch (1998 TV Series) – Paul K. Joyce
- The Worst Witch (2017 TV Series) – Mark Russell
- Wow! Wow! Wubbzy! – Brad Mossman
- WWE Main Event ("On My Own") – CFO$
- WWE NXT ("Welcome Home") – Coheed and Cambria
- WWE Raw ("Legendary") – Skillet
- WWE Saturday Morning Slam ("The Time is Mine") – Jim Johnston
- WWE SmackDown ("Are You Ready") – AC/DC
- WWE Tough Enough ("Champion") – Chipmunk ft. Chris Brown
- The X-Files ("Materia Primoris") – Mark Snow
- Xena: Warrior Princess – Joseph LoDuca
- Xuxa ("Xuxa's Theme (O Xou da Xuxa Começou)" aka "Hello, Hello, Hello!") – Xuxa
- Yancy Derringer – Don Quinn and Henry Russell
- A Year at the Top – Howard Greenfield and Paul Shaffer
- The Yellow Rose ("The Yellow Rose of Texas") – Johnny Lee and Lane Brody
- Yes, Dear ("Family is Family") – performed and written by Bill Janovitz
- Yes Minister – Ronnie Hazlehurst
- Yin Yang Yo! – Kyle Massey
- Yo Gabba Gabba! – opening and closing themes by Adam Deibert
- You Can't Do That on Television (Dixieland Jazz version of "William Tell Overture") – The National Press Club and Allied Workers Jazz Band
- You Don't Say! (original NBC version, 1963–69) – Rex Koury
- You Rang M'Lord? – Jimmy Perry and Roy Moore, performed by Bob Monkhouse and Paul Shane
- You Take the Kids – Jeff Moss (performed by Nell Carter
- Young Americans ("Six Pacs") – The Getaway People
- The Young and the Restless ("Nadia's Theme") – Barry De Vorzon and Perry Botkin Jr.
- Young Dan'l Boone – Earle Hagen
- Young Maverick – David Buttolph
- The Young Ones – Sid Tepper and Roy C. Bennett
- The Young Rebels – Dominic Frontiere
- Young Sheldon ("Mighty Little Man") – Steve Burns
- Z-Cars – Fritz Spiegl and Bridget Fry, adapted from the traditional Liverpool folk song "Johnny Todd"
- Zig and Zag ("Zig and Zag") – Ricky Wilson and Simon Rix
- Zoboomafoo ("Me and You and Zoboomafoo") – Kratt brothers
- Zoey 101 ("Follow Me") – Jamie Lynn Spears
- The Zoo Gang – Paul and Linda McCartney and performed by Paul McCartney and Wings
- Zoobilee Zoo ("Zoobilee Zoo") – Shuki Levy and Haim Saban
- Zorro – George Bruns and Norman Foster

== See also ==
- List of television theme music composers
