= List of television theme music composers =

The following list contains composers of the primary theme music of a television series or miniseries.

They are sorted alphabetically by composer.

== A - B ==
- Nathan Brannon - "TV Composer" (Alora & Skull Roses)
- Amanda Abizaid - "A Place in Time" (Theme from The 4400)
- John Addison - "Theme from Nero Wolfe", "Theme from Murder, She Wrote"
- Alabama 3 - "Woke Up This Morning" (Theme from The Sopranos)
- Jeff Alexander - "Theme from Please Don't Eat The Daisies", "Theme from, Julia"
- Tony Asher - "God Only Knows" (Theme from Big Love)
- Edwin Astley - Themes from "The Saint", "Dangerman", "Randell and Hopkirk", and many more 1970s TV series
- B*Witched - "Sabrina (She'll Bewitch Ya)" (Theme from Sabrina: The Animated Series)
- Johann Sebastian Bach - "Brandenburg Concerto No. 2 in F Major, Third Movement, Allegro assai" (Theme from Firing Line)
- Pete Baikie - "Shooting Stars"' (Theme from Shooting Stars)
- Lazlo Bane - "Superman" (Theme from Scrubs)
- Jeff Barry - "Without Us" (Theme from Family Ties) (with Tom Scott) - sung by Johnny Mathis (and Deniece Williams), "This Is It" (Theme from One Day at a Time) (with Nancy Barry), "Movin' on Up" (Theme from The Jeffersons) (with Ja'Net DuBois), "It Could Be Magic" (Theme from Tabitha)
- John Barry - "Theme from The Persuaders", "Theme from The Adventurer"
- Eric Bazilian - "One of Us" (Theme from Joan of Arcadia performed by Joan Osborne)
- Barenaked Ladies "Big Bang Theory Theme" (Theme from The Big Bang Theory)
- Don Battye - "Theme from Sons and Daughters" (with Peter Pinne)
- Jeff Beal - "Theme from Monk" (first season only)
- Natasha Bedingfield - "Unwritten" (Theme from The Hills)
- Drake Bell - "I Found a Way" (Theme from Drake & Josh)
- Elmer Bernstein - "Theme from Johnny Staccato, "Theme from Riverboat, "Theme from The Rookies"
- Dylan Berry - "Time Warner Sportsnet" (Themes include Access Sportsnet, L.A. Lakers, Galaxy, Sparks in Cincinnati)
- Betty - "The L Word Theme (The Way That We Live)" (Theme from The L Word), "It Girl" (Theme from Cover Shot)
- Ken Bichel - "Match Game"
- Beau Black - "Way Out" (Theme from Miles from Tomorrowland), "Theme from Mickey Mouse Mixed-Up Adventures", "Theme from Penn Zero: Part-Time Hero" (with Ryan Shore)
- BoDeans - "Closer to Free" (Theme from Party of Five)
- Perry Botkin Jr. - "Nadia's Theme" (Theme from The Young and the Restless) (with Barry De Vorzon), "Theme from Mork & Mindy, The ABC Sunday Night Movie (1974-1980)
- Bowling for Soup - "Today Is Gonna Be a Great Day" (Theme from Phineas and Ferb)
- Boyce and Hart - "(Theme From) The Monkees" (Theme from The Monkees")
- Boyz II Men - "Different World" (Theme from A Different World)
- Wayne Brady - "Livin' for the Weekend" (Theme from The Weekenders)
- Lou Briel - "No te Duermas" (Theme from No te Duermas (TV series) Telemundo, Puerto Rico
- Danielle Brisebois - "Unwritten" (Theme from The Hills)
- Bruce Broughton "Theme from JAG", "Theme from Dinosaurs"
- Dennis C. Brown - "Theme from Dharma & Greg"
- David Buttolph - "Maverick" (Theme from Maverick)
- Jake Bugg - "Troubled Town" (Theme from Happy Valley)

== C - D ==
- Ann Hampton Callaway = (The Nanny Named Fran") (Theme from The Nanny) (with Liz Callaway)
- Steve Carlisle - "WKRP in Cincinnati" (Theme from WKRP in Cincinnati)
- John Cacavas - "Theme from Kojak"
- The Chamber Brothers - "Time Has Come Today" (Theme from Early Edition)
- Les Claypool - "Theme from South Park"
- Bob Cobert - "Theme from Dark Shadows", "Theme from To Tell the Truth", "Window Shopping" (Theme from The Price Is Right), "Theme from (Blockbusters)"
- Cy Coleman - "Playboy's Theme" (Theme from Playboy After Dark)
- Phil Collins - "Two Worlds" (Theme from The Legend of Tarzan
- Frank Comstock - "Theme from The Adventures of Rocky and Bullwinkle and Friends" (Seasons 1–2), "Theme from Adam-12"
- Marius Constant - "Theme from The Twilight Zone"
- Bill Conti - "Come with Me Now" (Theme from Lifestyles of the Rich and Famous) (with Norman Gimbel), "Theme from Dynasty", "Theme from Falcon Crest", "Theme from Cagney & Lacey"
- Stewart Copeland - "Theme from The Equalizer"
- Miranda Cosgrove - "Leave It All to Me" (Theme from iCarly") (featuring Drake Bell)
- Alexander Courage - "Theme from Star Trek"
- David Croft - "Theme from 'Allo 'Allo!"
- The Crystal Method - "Keep Hope Alive" (Theme from Third Watch) and "Theme from Bones"
- Douglas J. Cuomo - "Theme from Sex and the City"
- Hoyt Curtin - "Theme from Jonny Quest"; "Meet the Flintstones" (Theme from The Flintstones), "Theme from The Jetsons" (both with William Hanna and Joseph Barbera)
- Sonny Curtis - "Love is All Around" (Theme from The Mary Tyler Moore Show)
- Miley Cyrus - "The Best of Both Worlds" (Theme from Hannah Montana)
- The Dandy Warhols - "We Used to Be Friends" (Theme from Veronica Mars)
- Darling Violetta - "Theme from Angel"
- Daughtry - "Home" (Theme from Beach House)
- Mack David - "Theme from 77 Sunset Strip", "Theme from Surfside 6", "This Is It-The Bugs Bunny Overture" (Theme from The Bugs Bunny Show)
- Frank De Vol - "Theme from My Three Sons", "Theme from Family Affair", "Theme from The Brady Bunch" (with Sherwood Schwartz)
- Dick DeBenedictis - "Theme from Matlock", "Theme from Jake and the Fatman", "Theme from Diagnosis: Murder", "Theme from Father Dowling Mysteries"
- John Debney - "Theme from The Young Riders", "Theme from seaQuest DSV"
- Gavin DeGraw - "I Don't Want to Be" (Theme from One Tree Hill)
- Milton Delugg - "Theme from The Gong Show, Treasure Hunt"
- Delia Derbyshire - "Theme from Doctor Who"
- Destiny's Child - "Theme from The Proud Family" (featuring Solange Knowles)
- Devo - "Uncontrollable Urge" (Theme from Ridiculousness)
- Dwiki Dharmawan - "Impian Cinta" (Theme from Bella Vista); "Melangkah Di Awan" (Theme from Melangkah Di Atas Awan)
- Dido - "Here with Me" (Theme from Roswell)
- The Divine Comedy - "Songs of Love" (Theme from Father Ted)
- DJ Jazzy Jeff & the Fresh Prince - "Yo Home to Bel-Air" (Theme from The Fresh Prince of Bel-Air)
- Dr. John - "My Opinionation" (Theme from Blossom)
- Hilary Duff - "Come Clean" (Theme from Laguna Beach: The Real Orange County)
- George Duke - "TSOP '87 Remix" (Theme from Soul Train)
- George Duning - "Theme from The Big Valley"

== E - F ==
- Randy Edelman - "Theme from MacGyver"
- Elegant Too - "Bob's Burgers Theme" (Theme from Bob's Burgers)
- Danny Elfman - "Theme from Tales from the Crypt", "The Simpsons Theme" (Theme from The Simpsons, "Dilbert Zone" (Theme from Dilbert), "Theme from Desperate Housewives"
- Jack Elliott - "Theme from Barney Miller" (with Allyn Ferguson), "Theme from Charlie's Angels", "Theme from Night Court"
- Ray Evans - "Bonanza" ("Theme from Bonanza") (with Jay Livingston), "Theme from Mister Ed", "Tammy" (Theme from Tammy)
- Greg Evigan - "B.J. McKay" (Theme from B. J. and the Bear), "P.S. I Luv U Theme" (Theme from P.S. I Luv U) (with Suzanne Fountain), "You Can Count on Me" (Theme from My Two Dads)
- Kurt Farquhar - "Theme from Sister, Sister", "Gotta Move" (Theme From Moesha)
- Louis Febre - "Theme from L.A. Heat"
- José Feliciano - "Chico and the Man" (Theme from Chico and the Man)
- Brad Fiedel - "Theme from Midnight Caller"
- Jerry Fielding - "Theme from Hogan's Heroes"
- Foo Fighters - "Next Year" (Theme from Ed)
- Tony Flynn - "Theme from The Tomorrow People"
- Charles Fox - "Theme from Happy Days" (with Norman Gimbel), "Making Our Dreams Come True" (Theme from Laverne & Shirley), "Different Worlds" (Theme from Angie, "Theme from Wonder Woman", "The First Years" (Theme from The Paper Chase), "Ready to Take a Chance Again" (Theme from Foul Play), "Theme from The Love Boat" (with Paul Williams), "Together Through the Years" (Theme from The Hogan Family) with Stephen Geyer, "Theme from Love, American Style" (with Arnold Margolin)
- Christopher Franke - "Theme from Babylon 5"
- Aretha Franklin - "Different World" (Theme from A Different World)
- Jesse Frederick - "As Days Go By" (Theme from Family Matters), "Everywhere You Look" (Themes from Full House and Fuller House), "Second Time Around", "Theme from Step by Step" (with Teresa James)
- Gerald Fried - "Flamingo Road Theme" (Theme from Flamingo Road), "Theme from Mr. Terrific"
- Dominic Frontiere - "Who Needs Wings to Fly?" (Theme from The Flying Nun), "Theme from The Rat Patrol", Theme from The Invaders, "Theme from The Immortal", "Theme from The Silent Force", "Theme from Chopper One", "Theme from Vega$", "Theme from Strike Force", "Theme from The Outer Limits", "Theme from Matt Houston"

== G - H ==
- Stephen Geyer - "Theme from The Wuzzles"
- Marla Gibbs - "There's No Place Like Home" (Theme from 227)
- Jackie Gleason - "You're My Greatest Love" (Theme from The Honeymooners), "Melancholy Serenade" (Theme from The Jackie Gleason Show)
- Andrew Gold - "Thank You for Being a Friend" (Theme from The Golden Girls), "Final Frontier" (Theme from Mad About You)
- Murray Gold - "Doctor Who (revival)", "Torchwood", "The Sarah Jane Adventures", "Last Tango in Halifax", "The Musketeers"
- Billy Goldenberg - "Theme from Alias Smith and Jones", "Theme from Kojak", "Theme from Ghost Story", "Theme from Our House"
- Renee Elise Goldsberry - "Theme from Muppet Babies"
- Jerry Goldsmith - "Theme from The Man from U.N.C.L.E., "Theme from Star Trek: The Next Generation" (with Alexander Courage), "Theme from Star Trek: Voyager", "Theme from Police Story", "Theme from Room 222"
- Joel Goldsmith - "Theme from Martial Law"
- Charles Gounod - "Funeral March for a Marionette" (Theme from Alfred Hitchcock Presents)
- Ron Grainer - "Theme from Doctor Who", "Theme from Man in a Suitcase, "Theme from The Prisoner"
- Amy Grant - "Believe" (Theme from Three Wishes)
- Macy Gray - "I'm in Between" (Theme from As Told by Ginger)
- George Greeley - "Theme from My Favorite Martian"
- Howard Greenfield - "Theme from Bewitched" (with Jack Keller), "Seattle" (Theme from Here Comes the Brides)
- Merv Griffin - "Think Music" (Theme from Jeopardy!), "Changing Keys" (Theme from Wheel of Fortune), "Griffinaire" (Theme from The Merv Griffin Show), "Buzzword" (Theme from Merv Griffin's Crosswords)
- Charles Gross - "Theme from Call to Glory", "Theme from The Doctors", "Theme from N.Y.P.D."
- Guy Gross - "Theme from Farscape"
- Dave Grusin - "Theme from St. Elsewhere", "Theme from Roll Out", "Keep Your Eye on the Sparrow" (Theme from Baretta) (with Morgan Ames), "Theme from It Takes a Thief"
- Vince Guaraldi - "Linus and Lucy" (Theme from Peanuts)
- Earle Hagen - "The Fishin' Hole" (Theme from The Andy Griffith Show), "Keep Your Fingers Crossed" (Theme from The Dick Van Dyke Show), "Theme from That Girl" (with Sam Denoff), "Theme from Gomer Pyle, U.S.M.C.","Theme from I Spy", "Theme from The Mod Squad", "Theme from The Danny Thomas Show", "Harlem Nocturne" (Theme from Mickey Spillane's Mike Hammer)
- Chuck Hammer - "The First 48"
- Jan Hammer - "Theme from Miami Vice"
- Joe Harnell - "The Lonely Man Theme" (Theme from The Incredible Hulk)
- Tony Hatch - "Theme from Crossroads", "Theme from Emmerdale", "Theme from Sportsnight", "Theme from Neighbours"
- Wilbur Hatch - "Theme from The Lucy Show", "Theme from Here's Lucy"
- Isaac Hayes - "Theme from Shaft"
- Ronnie Hazlehurst - "Theme from Last of the Summer Wine", "Theme from Only Fools and Horses", "Theme from Wogan", "Theme from Yes Minister"
- Neal Hefti - "Theme from Batman", "Themes from The Odd Couple and The New Odd Couple"
- Paul Henning - "The Ballad of Jed Clampett" (Theme from The Beverly Hillbillies), "Theme from Petticoat Junction" (with Curt Massey)
- Will Hoge - "You Make Me Happy" (Theme from Still Standing)
- Laurie Holloway - "Theme from Blind Date", "Theme from Beadle's About"
- Olivia Holt - "Time of Our Lives" (Theme from I Didn't Do It)
- James Newton Howard - "Theme from ER", "Theme from The Sentinel"
- Mike Hugg - "Theme from Whatever Happened to the Likely Lads?" (with Ian La Frenais)

== I - J ==
- I Fight Dragons - "Rewind" (Theme from The Goldbergs)
- Billy Idol - "Hot in the City" (Theme from Booker)
- Jerrold Immel - "Theme from Dallas", "Theme from Knots Landing", "Theme from King's Crossing", "Theme from Paradise"
- Inner Circle - "Bad Boys" (Theme from Cops)
- Mark Isham "Theme from Chicago Hope"
- Bob James - "Angela" (Theme from Taxi)
- Al Jarreau - "Theme from Moonlighting"
- Waylon Jennings - "Good Ol' Boys" (Theme from The Dukes of Hazzard)
- Carly Rae Jepsen - "Everywhere You Look" (Theme from Fuller House)
- The Jets - "Theme from Chip 'n Dale: Rescue Rangers
- Laurie Johnson - "Theme from The Avengers", "Theme from The Professionals"
- Quincy Jones - "The Streetbeater" (Theme from Sanford and Son), "Theme from Ironside", "Hikky Burr" (Theme from The Bill Cosby Show) (both with Bill Cosby), "Chump Change" (Theme from Now You See It)
- Tom Jones and The Flaming Lips - "Duck Dodgers" (Theme from Duck Dodgers)
- Jump5 - "Aloha, E Komo Mai" (Theme from Lilo & Stitch: The Series)

8

== K - L ==
- Edd Kalehoff - "Theme from The Price Is Right"
- Yoko Kanno - "Tank!" / " The Real Folk Blues" (Themes from Cowboy Bebop), "Inner Universe" / "Lithium Flower" (Themes from Ghost in the Shell: Stand Alone Complex), "Stray" / "Gravity" (Themes from Wolf's Rain)
- Bronislaw Kaper - "Theme from The F.B.I."
- Jake Kaufman - "Let's Watch the Show" (Theme from OK K.O.! Let's Be Heroes)
- Jack Keller - "Theme from Bewitched" (with Howard Greenfield), "Seattle" (Theme from Here Comes the Brides)
- Arthur Kent - "Bring Me Sunshine" (Theme from The Morecambe & Wise Show)
- B.B. King - "Wall Street Blues" (Theme from The Associates)
- Milan Kymlicka "Theme from Babar"
- Lady Sovereign - "Love Me or Hate Me (Fuck You!!!!)" (Theme from The Bad Girls Club)
- Glen A. Larson - "Unknown Stuntman" (Theme from The Fall Guy) sung by (Lee Majors),
- William Lava - "Theme from F Troop" (with Irving Taylor)
- Linda Lavin - "There's a New Girl in Town" (Theme from Alice)
- The Lettermen - "Worlds" (Theme from Bracken's World) (second season vocal)
- Sylvester Levay - "Theme from Airwolf", "Theme from Otherworld", "Theme from Probe"
- Michael A. Levine - "Theme from Cold Case"
- Walt Levinsky - "Theme from Family Feud"
- Jay Livingston - "Bonanza" ("Theme from Bonanza") (with Ray Evans), "Theme from Mister Ed", "Tammy" (Theme from Tammy)
- Jerry Livingston - "Theme from 77 Sunset Strip", "Theme from Surfside 6", "This Is It-The Bugs Bunny Overture" (Theme from The Bugs Bunny Show)
- Darlene Love and The Blossoms - "Theme from Barefoot in the Park"
- Love Spit Love - "How Soon Is Now?" (Theme from Charmed)

== M - N ==
- Mr. Big - "Shine" (End Theme from Hellsing)
- Mark Mancina - "Theme from The Outer Limits" and "Theme from Poltergeist: The Legacy" (with John Van Tongeren)
- Henry Mancini - "Theme from Pink Panther", "Theme from Remington Steele", "Theme from Peter Gunn", "Theme from Newhart", "The NBC Mystery Movie" Theme / "Sunday Mystery Movie" Theme (often used in Columbo), "Bumper's Theme" (Music from The Blue Knight), "Themes from What's Happening!! and What's Happening Now!!"
- Johnny Mandel "Suicide Is Painless" (aka "Song from M*A*S*H"), "Theme from Too Close for Comfort"
- Barry Manilow - "Bandstand Boogie" (Theme from American Bandstand)
- Keith Mansfield - "Theme from Grandstand"
- Richard Markowitz - "Theme from The Wild Wild West"
- Jack Marshall - "Theme from The Munsters", "Theme from Karen" (with Bob Mosher)
- Massive Attack - "Paradise Circus" (Theme from Luther), "Teardrop" (Theme from House)
- Billy May - "Somewhere in the Night" (Theme from Naked City"), "Flight of the Bumblebee" (Theme from The Green Hornet
- Simon May - "EastEnders theme tune" (Theme from EastEnders) (both with Leslie Osborne); "Theme from Howards' Way"
- Dennis McCarthy - "Theme from V: The Series, "Theme from Houston Knights", "Theme from Star Trek: Deep Space Nine"
- China Anne McClain - Expectional" (Theme from A.N.T. Farm), "The Doc Is In" (Theme from Doc McStuffins)
- Bear McCreary - "Theme from Battlestar Galactica (2004)", "Theme from Black Sails (TV series)"
- Gil Mellé - "Theme from Night Gallery", "Theme from Kolchak: The Night Stalker"
- Christina Milian - "Call Me, Beep Me!" (Theme from Kim Possible)
- Vic Mizzy - "Theme from The Addams Family", "Theme from Green Acres", "Theme from Captain Nice"
- Fred Mollin - "Theme from Friday the 13th: The Series", "Theme from Forever Knight"
- Hugo Montenegro - "Theme from I Dream of Jeannie" (with Buddy Kaye)
- Guy Moon - "Rudy's Got the Chalk" (Theme from ChalkZone), "Theme from Cow & Chicken"
- Mandy Moore - "Theme from Sheriff Callie's Wild West",
- John Morris - "Theme from Coach"
- Mark Mothersbaugh - "Theme from Rugrats (with Bob Mothersbaugh)
- The Mowgli's - "Big City Greens Main Title" (Theme from Big City Greens)
- Mark Mueller - "DuckTales Theme" (Theme from DuckTales)
- Lorenzo Music - "Home to Emily" (Theme from The Bob Newhart Show) (with Henrietta Music)
- Murfin Music International - "Theme from You Bet!" and "Theme from Gladiators"
- Mitchel Musso - "Top of the World" (Theme from Pair of Kings) (with Doc Shaw)
- David Naughton - "Makin' It" (Theme from Makin' It)
- Oliver Nelson - "Theme from The Six Million Dollar Man"
- Robbie Nevil - "The Best of Both Worlds" (Theme from Hannah Montana) (with Matthew Gerrard)
- Randy Newman - "Under the Gun" (Theme from Cop Rock), "It's a Jungle Out Theme" (Theme from Monk) (second season only)
- Nerf Herder - "Theme from Buffy the Vampire Slayer"
- Don Nicholl - "Come and Knock on Our Door" (Theme from Three's Company)
- Harry Nilsson - "Best Friend" (Theme from The Courtship of Eddie's Father)
- Brandy Norwood - "Gotta Move" (Theme from Moesha)

== O - P ==
- Oasis - "Half the World Away" (Theme from The Royle Family)
- Ozzy Osbourne - "Theme from Dog the Bounty Hunter"
- Lindsay Pagano - "Everything U R" (Theme from Maybe It's Me)
- Norrie Paramor - "Ciccolino" (Theme from Call My Bluff)
- Jim Parker - "Theme from Mapp & Lucia", "Theme from Foyle's War", "Theme from Midsomer Murders"
- Andy Pask - "Overkill" (Theme from The Bill) (with Charlie Morgan)
- Johnny Pearson - "Heavy Action" (Theme from Monday Night Football)
- Jimmy Perry - "Who Do You Think You Are Kidding, Mr Hitler?" (Theme from Dad's Army) (sung by Bud Flanagan)
- Phantom Planet - "California" (Theme from The O.C.)
- Stu Phillips - "Theme from Battlestar Galactica", "Theme from Buck Rogers in the 25th Century", "Theme from Knight Rider", "Theme from Quincy, M.E."
- Steve Plunkett - "7th Heaven" (Theme from 7th Heaven)
- David Pomeranz - "Nothing's Gonna Stop Me Now" (Theme from Perfect Strangers)
- Gary Portnoy - "Where Everybody Knows Your Name" (Theme from Cheers), "Every Time I Turn Around" (Theme from Punky Brewster)
- Mike Post - "Theme from Baa Baa Black Sheep" (with Pete Carpenter), "Theme from Magnum, P.I.", "Theme from The Rockford Files", "Theme from The A-Team", "Theme from Hunter", "Theme from The White Shadow", "Theme from Riptide", "Theme from Toma", "Theme from L.A. Law", "Theme from Law & Order", "Theme from Doogie Howser, M.D.", "Theme from Quantum Leap", "Theme from Hill Street Blues", "Theme from Wiseguy"
- Robert Prince - "Theme from The Fantastic Journey"
- Puffy AmiYumi - "Hi-Hi" (Theme from Hi Hi Puffy AmiYumi), "Teen Titans Theme" (Music from Teen Titans) and remixed by (Mix Master Mike Remix of Teen Titans Go!)

== Q - S ==
- Queen - "Princes of the Universe" (Theme from Highlander: The Series)
- Boots Randolph - "Yakety Sax" (Theme from The Benny Hill Show)
- The Refreshments - "Yahoos and Triangles" (Theme from King of the Hill
- The Rembrandts - "I'll Be There For You" (Theme from Friends)
- Remy Zero - "Save Me" (Theme from Smallville)
- Sonny Rhodes - "Ballad of Serenity" (Theme from Firefly)
- Neil Richardson - "Approaching Menace" (Theme from Mastermind)
- Nelson Riddle - "Theme from Emergency!" (with Billy May), "Theme from Route 66", "Theme from City of Angels"
- Holly Robinson - "21 Jump Street Theme" (Theme from 21 Jump Street)
- Leonard Rosenman - "Theme from Marcus Welby, M.D."
- Pete Rugolo - "Theme from Felony Squad", "Theme from The Fugitive"
- RuPaul - "Queer Duck" (Theme from Queer Duck)
- Tony Russell - "Happy Harry" (Theme from On the Buses)
- Debby Ryan - "Hey Jessie" (Theme from Jessie)
- Renee Sands - "The Chicken Squad Theme" (Theme from The Chicken Squad)
- Joey Scarbury - "Believe It or Not" (Theme from The Greatest American Hero)
- Lalo Schifrin - "Theme from Mission: Impossible", "Theme from Mannix", "Eyewitness News Theme (adapted from the Tar Sequence in the film Cool Hand Luke)", "Theme from Medical Center", "Theme from Petrocelli", "Theme from The Young Lawyers", "Theme from Glitter", "Theme from Starsky & Hutch", "Theme from Chicago Story", "Theme from Most Wanted", "Theme from Planet of the Apes"
- Scott Schreer - "Theme from Fox NFL Sunday"
- Franz Schubert - "Sonata No. 20 in A Major, D. 959, IV. Rondo. Allegretto" (Theme from Wings)
- David Schwartz - "Themes from Northern Exposure and Arrested Development"
- Sherwood Schwartz - "The Ballad of Gilligan's Isle" (Theme from Gilligan's Island) (with George Wyle), "Theme from The Brady Bunch" (with Frank De Vol), "Theme from It's About Time" (with Gerald Fried), "Theme from Dusty's Trail" (with Ross Schwartz)
- Tom Scott - "Gotcha" (Theme from Starsky & Hutch), "Without Us" (Theme from Family Ties) (with Jeff Barry) - sung by Johnny Mathis (and Deniece Williams)
- John Sebastian - "Welcome Back" (Theme from Welcome Back, Kotter)
- Vonda Shepard - "Searchin' My Soul" (Theme from Ally McBeal)
- Ryan Shore - Star Wars Forces of Destiny, Go! Go! Cory Carson, Penn Zero: Part-Time Hero
- Dmitri Shostakovich - "Prelude No. 15 from Twenty-four Preludes" (Theme from Ever Decreasing Circles)
- Jean Sibelius - "Intermezzo from Karelia Suite" (Theme from This Week)
- Simple Plan - "Theme from What's New, Scooby-Doo?", "I'd Do Anything" (Theme from Maybe It's Me)
- Dudley Simpson - "Theme from Blake's 7", "Theme from The Tomorrow People"
- Mark Snow - "Theme from The X-Files", "Theme from La Femme Nikita", "Theme from Millennium", "Theme from T. J. Hooker", "Theme from Hart to Hart", "Theme from Harsh Realm", "Theme from Starsky & Hutch", "Theme from Brothers & Sisters", "Theme from Crazy Like a Fox", "Theme from Bridges to Cross", "Guardian Theme" (Theme from The Guardian", "Theme from Nowhere Man", "Theme from The Lone Gunmen", "Theme from Pasadena"
- The Solids - "Hey Beautiful" (Theme from How I Met Your Mother), "The Future Is Now" (Theme from Oliver Beene)
- Eric Spear - "Lancashire Blues" (Theme from Coronation Street)
- Fred Steiner - "Park Avenue Beat" (Theme from Perry Mason), "Theme from The Adventures of Rocky and Bullwinkle and Friends" (seasons 3–5)
- Morton Stevens - "Theme from Hawaii Five-O", "Theme from "Police Woman""
- Richard Stone - "Theme from Animaniacs, Pinky and the Brain and Freakazoid"
- Matthew Strachan - Theme from "Who Wants to Be a Millionaire" (with Keith Strachan)
- Dinesh Subasinghe - "Theme From Sihina Wasanthayak" 'sansara purudada mey,' Theme for 'Punchi pahe mang' for Sirasa TV
- Skye Sweetnam - "Just the Way I Am" (Theme from The Buzz on Maggie)
- Irving Szathmary - "Theme from Get Smart", The I'm Dickens, He's Fenster March

== T - U ==
- John Tesh - "Roundball Rock" (Theme from NBA on NBC and Fox College Hoops), "Gridiron Dreams" (Theme from NFL on NBC)
- Alan Tew - "The Big One" (Theme from The People's Court)
- They Might Be Giants - "Boss of Me" (Theme from Malcolm in the Middle), "Dog on Fire" (Theme from The Daily Show), "Here in Higglytown" (Theme from Higglytown Heroes), "Mickey Mouse Clubhouse Theme Song" (Theme for Mickey Mouse Clubhouse) and "Hot Dog!" (Theme from Mickey Mouse Clubhouse)
- Johnny Tillotson - "(Wait "Til You See) My Gidget" (Theme from Gidget)
- Dimitri Tiomkin - "Rawhide" (Theme from Rawhide) (with Ned Washington)
- George Tipton - "Theme from It's a Living" (with Leslie Bricusse), "Theme from Benson"
- Michael Tolcher - "Sooner or Later" (Theme from Life As We Know It)
- Pete Townshend - "Who Are You" (Theme from CSI: Crime Scene Investigation), "Won't Get Fooled Again" (Theme from CSI: Miami), "Baba O'Riley" (Theme from CSI: NY), "I Can See for Miles" (Theme from CSI: Cyber)

== V - Z ==
- The Von Bondies - "C'mon C'mon" (Theme from Rescue Me)
- "Weird Al" Yankovic - "It's My World (And We're All Living in It)" (Theme from Milo Murphy's Law)
- W. G. Snuffy Walden - "Theme from Thirtysomething" (with Stewart Levin), "Theme from Roseanne", "Theme from The West Wing", "Theme from Early Edition", "Theme from My So-Called Life", "Theme from I'll Fly Away"
- The Wallflowers - "Empire in My Mind" (Theme from The Guardian)
- Joe Walsh - "Future to This Life" (Theme from RoboCop) (with Lita Ford)
- War - "Low Rider" (Theme from George Lopez)
- Russell Watson - "Faith of the Heart" (Theme from Enterprise)
- Grover Washington Jr. - "Theme from The Cosby Show"
- John Williams - "The Mission" (Theme from NBC Nightly News), "Theme from Kraft Suspense Theatre", "Themes from Lost in Space", The Time Tunnel and Land of the Giants", "Theme from Amazing Stories",
- Patrick Williams - "Theme from The Streets of San Francisco"
- Brian Wilson - "God Only Knows" (Theme from Big Love)
- Dennis Wilson - "Theme from Fawlty Towers"
- Jonathan Wolff - "Theme from Seinfeld"
- Xuxa - "Xuxa's Theme" (Theme from Xuxa)
- Zendaya - "Keep It Undercover" (Theme from K.C. Undercover)
- Warren Zevon - "Real or Not (Theme from TekWar), "Even A Dog Can Shake Hands" (Theme from Action)
- Hans Zimmer - "Theme from The Critic"

== See also ==
- List of television theme music
