= Jerrold Immel =

United States television music composer (born 1936)

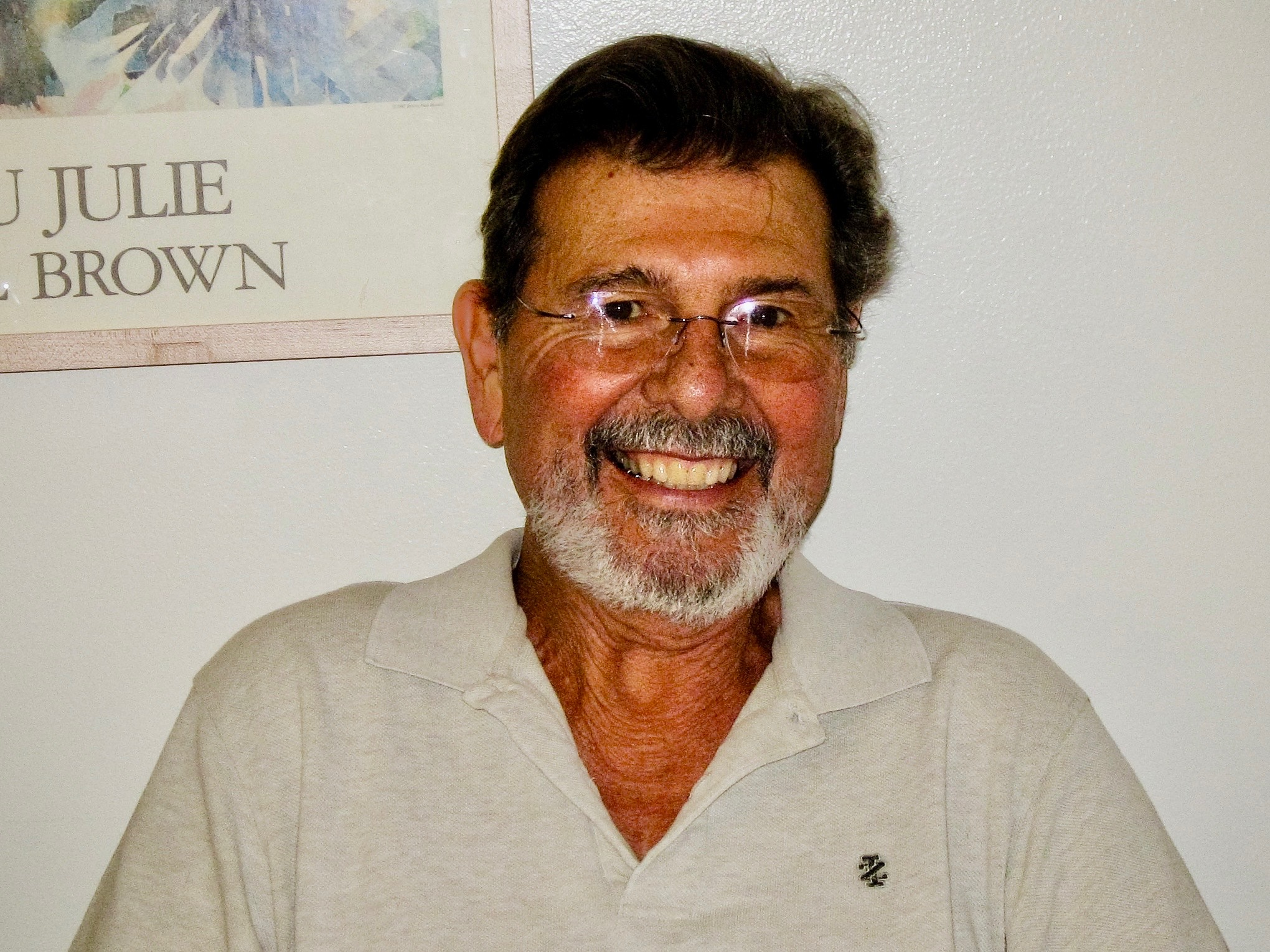
- Immel in 2009
- Born: Jerrold Earle Immel; September 9, 1936 (age 89); Los Angeles, U.S.
- Education: University of California, Los Angeles
- Occupation: Composer • conductor • arranger • orchestrator
- Notable work: Themes and music from Dallas, Knots Landing, How the West Was Won, Walker, Texas Ranger
- Spouse: Ann M. Beckett (m. 1976)

Jerrold Earle Immel (born 9 September 1936) is an American television music composer. He most notably composed the theme songs for the primetime soap operas Dallas and Knots Landing.

== Early life and career ==
Born in Los Angeles, California, Immel attended the University of California, Los Angeles. In jazz groups at UCLA and around Los Angeles, Immel played various woodwind instruments including the alto saxophone, clarinet, and flute. Immel worked as a music copyist at CBS, before getting his break into television scoring on Gunsmoke. Other programs which he has contributed music to include How the West Was Won, Hawaii Five-O, Logan's Run, Walker, Texas Ranger (through 1995 season) and Voyagers!. He has also composed music for films, including the scores to Matilda (1978), Death Hunt (1981), Sourdough (1981) and Megaforce (1982).

== Television scores (partial) ==
"Episode(s)" denotes the listing may be incomplete.

Year	Title	Info	On CD?
1973-1975	Gunsmoke	27 episodes (from season 18 to season 20) "Sarah" (first episode) "Manolo" (finale episode)	NO
1977	Logan's Run	Two episodes: "The Innocent" "Half Lite"; Complete episode scores to the series available on Film Score Monthly.	YES
1978–1991; 1996; 1998	Dallas	55 episodes + 2 TV movies (all seasons); And theme music.	NO
1979	Knots Landing	12 episodes (some co-composed with Craig Huxley) (from season 1 to the season 14 finale); And theme music.	NO
1982	King's Crossing	"Keepers of the Ring" (Pilot)	NO
1982-1983	Voyagers!	2 episodes (Season 1); And theme music.	NO
1985	The Twilight Zone	One Episode (Season 1): "If She Dies / Ye Gods" (segment one, "If She Dies")	NO
1988-1990	Guns of Paradise	Episode(s): "The News from St. Louis" (pilot) "The Holstered Gun" "Founder's Day" "Ghost Dance" "The Promise" "Childhood's End" "A Private War" "Crossroads" "A Matter of Honor: Part 1" "Squaring Off"; Season 2: "Common Good" "All the Pretty Little Horses" "Boomtown" "The Gates of Paradise" "Avenging Angel" "The Coward"; Season 3: "Out of Ashes" "The Women" (final episode); And theme music.	NO
1995	Walker, Texas Ranger	All Episodes (season 3): "Badge of Honor" "Silk Dreams" "Till Death Do Us Part" "The Road to Black Bayou" "Line of Fire" "Tiger's Eye" "Money Train" "War Zone"; And Season 3 theme.	NO
