= Pete Carpenter =

Musical artist (1914-1987)

Background information
- Born: Clarence E. Carpenter; April 1, 1914; Honolulu, Hawaii
- Died: October 18, 1987 (aged 73) Sherman Oaks, California, U.S.
- Genre: Jazz
- Occupations: Musician, arranger
- Instrument: Trombone

Clarence Edward "Pete" Carpenter (April 1, 1914 – October 18, 1987) was an American jazz trombonist, arranger, and veteran of television theme music sheet music. After a long career playing the trombone in bands and as a studio musician, Carpenter started working with composer Earle Hagen and writing music for television on shows like Bewitched (1964), Gomer Pyle, U.S.M.C. (1964), and The Andy Griffith Show (1966–1967).

== Music ==
Carpenter's collaboration with the much younger composer Mike Post began in 1968 and lasted until Carpenter's death nearly two decades later. The two saw some success when they wrote the theme for producer Stephen J. Cannell's first show, the police detective drama Toma in 1973. But their big breakthrough was the top 10 Billboard hit and Grammy Award-winning theme for Cannell's private detective drama The Rockford Files in 1974, starring James Garner.

== Film and television works ==
Carpenter and Post went on to score over 1800 hours of television, and to compose the music for television shows like The Rockford Files (1974), Baa Baa Black Sheep (1976), CHiPs (1977), Magnum, P.I. (1980), Tenspeed and Brown Shoe (1980), The A-Team (1983), Hardcastle and McCormick (1983), Riptide (1984), Hunter (1984), Stingray (1985), as well as movies like Vanishing Point (1971), Rabbit Test (1978), and Will: G. Gordon Liddy (1982). In addition to their 17th Annual Grammy Awards for Grammy Award for Best Arrangement, Instrumentalist for Rockford, for Hunter the duo won a Broadcast Music, Inc. TV Music Award in 1989.

The theme for The A-Team and The Rockford Files have also made appearances on other television programs and movies, including the pilot for David Chase's hit show on HBO, The Sopranos (1999), and the films Not Another Teen Movie (2001), Dumb and Dumberer: When Harry Met Lloyd (2003), Napoleon Dynamite (2004), and Miracle (2004).

== Personal life ==
Carpenter died of lung cancer in Sherman Oaks, California on October 18, 1987, at the age of 73. He was married to actress Maybeth Carr, the daughter of silent screen star Mary Carr, and had two children, Pete Jr., and Nancy.

The Magnum, P.I. episode "Innocence... A Broad" was dedicated to him. In 1987, Mike Post and the BMI Foundation established a Pete Carpenter Memorial Fund to benefit young composers.
