= Jonathan Wolff (musician) =

American composer (born 1958)

- Born: October 23, 1958 (age 67); Louisville, Kentucky, U.S.
- Occupation: Composer
- Instrument: Keyboards

Jonathan Wolff (born October 23, 1958) is an American composer. Wolff was born in Louisville, Kentucky, and attended Atherton High School. He is well known for creating the theme and music for the television series Seinfeld. Wolff is also the composer for about 75 other TV series, including Will & Grace, Who's the Boss?, Married... with Children, The Hughleys, The King of Queens, and Reba.
