= Phoebe Greenberg =

Canadian actress, writer, and producer

Phoebe Greenberg (born 10 January 1964) is an actress, writer and producer based in Montreal, Canada. She is the daughter of Irving Greenberg, one of the founders of Minto Group in 1955 and Shirley Greenberg. She is also the mother of artist Miles Greenberg.

== Biography ==
Originally from Ottawa, Canada, Phoebe Greenberg is a graduate of the Jacques Lecoq International Theater School in Paris. After working almost two decades in theater, Greenberg turned her interest towards contemporary art.

Phoebe Greenberg established PHI in Montreal, Canada. PHI consists of the PHI Foundation for Contemporary Art (2007, formerly DHC/ART), the PHI Centre (2012), and the PHI Studio (2019).

The PHI Foundation for Contemporary Art, the first entity under the banner of PHI, was established in 2007. Akin to the ‘kunsthalle’ model, the PHI Foundation became a non-collecting institution exhibiting contemporary art. Greenberg committed to ensuring that this infrastructure would be free to the public.

In 2012 Greenberg established the PHI Centre to champion projects at the crossroads of art, cinema, music, virtual reality and augmented reality. Greenberg's first virtual reality work was a collaboration with Felix & Paul Studios with Patrick Watson in 2015. Strangers was a one-on-one encounter with the musician at his Montreal studio. PHI Studio (2019) develops exhibitions and immersive experiences.

== PHI Foundation for Contemporary Art ==
Greenberg first founded the PHI Foundation for Contemporary Art (formerly known as DHC/ART) in 2007. The program offers two to three major exhibitions per year, educational activities, interdisciplinary collaborative projects and public events. All activities offered by the Foundation are free of charge to the public.

In March 2019, DHC/ART changed its name to the PHI Foundation for Contemporary Art by Greenberg, aiming to unite the growing cultural infrastructure and offer under the banner of PHI.

Over the past years, the PHI Foundation has presented artists such as Marc Quinn, Sophie Calle, John Currin, Ryoji Ikeda, Jake & Dinos Chapman, Jenny Holzer, Björk, Yoko Ono and many others. In celebration of its 15th anniversary, the PHI Foundation has allegedly welcomed Japanese artist Yayoi Kusama in 2022.

== PHI Centre ==
In 2012, Greenberg set up the PHI Centre, a multidisciplinary artistic and cultural hub. The institution brings together visual arts, cinema, music, design and new technologies, in order to encourage encounters between disciplines, as well as between artists and the public. The PHI Centre hosted, among others, the Red Bull Music Academy, Chilly Gonzales, Yasiin Bey (formally known as Mos Def), Nick Cave, Arthur H and Denis Villeneuve with his short film Next Floor, a cinematic work filmed and inspired by the building that now housed the PHI Centre before its reconstruction in 2008. The PHI Centre has presented numerous exhibitions, experiences, and performances, including the following:

- In the mouth (2014), a culinary experience focusing on the five senses.
- Björk Digital (2016) an "immersive" virtual reality exhibit by Icelandic musician Björk featuring 360-degree VR music videos from her eighth studio album, Vulnicura. The exhibition was presented in association with the Red Bull Music Academy.
- Believe your eyes (2017), a work by British group Punchdrunk.
- Alice: The Virtual Reality (2017), an immersive play based on Lewis Carroll's classic Alice's Adventures in Wonderland.
- Echo: The Sound of Space (2018), an immersive exhibition featuring Spheres, a virtual reality experience by Eliza McNitt.
- Cadavres Exquis (2019), an exhibition that featured contemporary artists including Marina Abramović, Olafur Eliasson, Laurie Anderson, Antony Gormley and Paul McCarthy.
- >HUM(AI)N (2019).
- Jim Carrey: This Light Never Goes Out (2019), an exhibition about comedian and actor Jim Carrey.
- The Horrifically Real Virtuality (2019), a new type of experience combining theater and new technologies in the universe of Ed Wood.
- We Live in an Ocean of Air (2021–22), an immersive experience from British studio Marshmallow Laser Feast.
- Lashing Skies (Ciel à outrances) (2022), an experience by Brigitte Poupart based on the poetic suite by Madeleine Monette.

== PHI Studio ==
The PHI Studio (established in 2019) develops exhibitions and "immersive experiences" presented locally and internationally.

PHI presents works abroad, through initiatives such as showing at the Rockefeller Center in New York City, the Tribeca Film Festival, programming and production of the Virtual Reality Pavilion at the Luxembourg City Film Festival as well as a gallery during the 58th Venice Biennale.

== PHI Contemporary ==
Opening its doors in 2026, PHI Contemporary is to be an institution of contemporary art and culture. The project will consolidate the full breadth of PHI under one roof.

=== The site ===
Located at the intersection of Bonsecours and Saint-Paul streets in the historic district of Montreal — Old Montreal, — the site of PHI Contemporary (formerly the Auberge Pierre-Du-Calvet) consists of four historic buildings that date to the 18th century and a large adjacent lot. In direct proximity to the Bonsecours Market (1847) and the Notre-Dame-de-Bonsecours Chapel (1675) - both storied landmarks of the city and its heritage.

=== International Architecture Competition ===
On August 26, 2021, PHI launched an International Architecture Competition for the design of PHI Contemporary. The call for candidature elicited 65 entries from architectural firms from 14 countries, of which 11 were selected to compete. The winning architectural firms, Kuehn Malvezzi + Pelletier de Fontenay, will pursue the mandate to develop their proposal for the architectural design of PHI Contemporary.

== Diving Horse Creations ==
Founded by Phoebe Greenberg, Diving Horse Creations was a former theater company (1990-2003) dedicated to exploring theater through corporeal research. Examples of projects performed within the company include:

- L’école des bouffons (1995), from the Belgian playwright Michel de Ghelderode;
- Croisades (2000); by the French writer and playwright Michel Azama;
- La Leçon (2001); a staging by Oleg Kisseliov of the play by Eugène Ionesco;
- Elizavieta Bam (2002); a play by Daniil Harms.

== Film producer ==
- Next Floor, directed by Denis Villeneuve, 2008
- Incendies, directed by Denis Villeneuve, 2010
- ÉCHO, directed by Edouard Lock
- Séances, is a 2016 interactive project by filmmaker and installation artist Guy Maddin produced at the PHI Centre
- Visitors, a 2013 American documentary film, written and directed by Godfrey Reggio
- Hope, Pedro Perez, by a play by Marie Brassard

== Awards and recognition ==
- Officière, Ordre national du Québec, 2018
- Compagne des arts et des lettres du Québec, 2017
- Fine Arts Awards of Distinction de l’Université Concordia, 2013
- Hommage à Phoebe Greenberg, Gala des arts visuels, 2012

Phoebe Greenberg is active on various boards of directors (Infrarouge, PLUS1, Felix & Paul Studios and the international committee of the Palais de Tokyo in Paris).

In 2021, Phoebe Greenberg won her case before the Superior Court of Quebec against her former assistant.

== Notes and references ==
- Next Floor, a short film by Denis Villeneuve, 2008
- Marc Quinn, PHI Foundation for Contemporary, 2008
- Take care of yourself, Sophie Calle, PHI Foundation for Contemporary Art, 2008
- John Currin, PHI Foundation for Contemporary Art, 2011
- Ryoji Ikeda, PHI Foundation for Contemporary Art, 2012
- Arcade Fire, PHI Centre, 2013
- Jake et Dinos Chapman: Come and See, PHI Foundation for Contemporary Art, 2014
- Arthur H, PHI Centre, 2014
- Allie X, PHI Centre, 2015
- Mos Def, PHI Centre, 2015
- Red Bull Music Academy, 2016
- Chilly Gonzales, PHI Centre, 2016
- Yoko Ono: Growing Freedom, PHI Foundation for Contemporary Art, 2019
- Spheres at the Rockefeller Center, 2018
- Cadavre Exquis, Centre PHI, 2019
- Ephemeral gallery, PHI Immersive: Theater of Virtuality, 2019
- Ephemeral gallery, PHI Immersive: Theater of Virtuality, 2019
- Immersive programming, Tribeca Film Festival, 2019
- CARNE y ARENA, PHI Studio, 2020
- THE INFINITE, PHI Studio, 2021
- The virtual reality pavilion, Luxembourg City Film Festival, 2022
- Yayoi Kusama, DANCING LIGHTS THAT FLEW UP TO THE UNIVERSE, PHI Foundation for Contemporary Art, 2022
- PHI Contemporary, 2022
- International Architecture Competition, PHI Contemporary, 2022
