= Kyle Dixon and Michael Stein =

American composer duo

Kyle Dixon and Michael Stein are American composers and electronic musicians. They are known for composing the score for the Netflix series Stranger Things, work for which they won a Primetime Emmy Award and received two Grammy Award nominations. The pair are members of the electronic band Survive and compose music for film, television, and other media under the name Short Hour.

== Background ==
Dixon and Stein began working together in Austin, Texas, in the electronic music scene. In 2009, they formed the synthesizer band Survive with Adam Jones and Mark Donica. The band's music has been associated with analog synthesizers, hardware-based live performance, and electronic compositions influenced by horror and science-fiction film music.

Dixon and Stein have described Survive and their scoring work as separate creative outlets. Stein has characterized Survive as one part of a wider compositional range, while the duo's film and television work, produced under the name Short Hour, includes music written for screen and installation projects.

== Scoring work ==
Dixon and Stein were hired to compose the score for Stranger Things after series creators The Duffer Brothers discovered Survive's music and used one of the band's tracks in an early pitch trailer for the series. The pair later said that only the two of them, rather than the full band, took on the scoring work because the production could not support the entire band and the job required full-time availability. Their score for the series drew attention for its use of synthesizers and its relationship to 1980s film and television music. Coverage of later seasons described the score as expanding with the series' increased scale, with Dixon and Stein discussing a more album-oriented approach to the third-season soundtrack and a greater use of percussive synthesizer elements for action and suspense scenes.

The Stranger Things score was released across multiple soundtrack albums by Lakeshore Records and Invada Records. Their theme music for the series won the Primetime Emmy Award for Outstanding Original Main Title Theme Music in 2017. The first two volumes of the Stranger Things soundtrack were nominated for the Grammy Award for Best Score Soundtrack for Visual Media.

Their work outside Stranger Things includes the score for the Darren Aronofsky-produced virtual reality series Spheres (2018), directed by Eliza McNitt. The project won the Grand Jury Prize for Best Virtual Reality at the Venice Film Festival. Dixon and Stein also scored the short film A Different Beyond (2018), directed by Matthew Libatique, the British drama series Butterfly (2018), the National Geographic docudrama miniseries Valley of the Boom (2019), and the Rashid Johnson-directed feature film Native Son (2019), an A24 production distributed by HBO that premiered at the Sundance Film Festival.

Later film credits include Joaquín del Paso's The Hole in the Fence (2021), which premiered at the Venice Film Festival, Amat Escalante's Lost in the Night (2023), The Retaliators (2022), and del Paso's The Garden We Dreamed. Dixon and Stein also composed music for Meow Wolf's permanent installation Convergence Station in Denver, and provided original music for Stranger Things VR.

In 2026, the duo toured Europe performing music from Stranger Things in a production developed with visual artist MFO (Marcel Weber), combining the score with lighting and sculpted fog.

== Filmography ==
=== Film ===
Year	Title	Notes
2018	A Different Beyond	Short film directed by Matthew Libatique
2019	Native Son	Feature film directed by Rashid Johnson; premiered at the Sundance Film Festival
2021	The Hole in the Fence	Premiered at the Venice Film Festival
2022	The Retaliators	Score album released in 2022
2023	Lost in the Night	Also known as Perdidos en la noche; score by Dixon and Stein
2026	The Garden We Dreamed	Also known as El jardín que soñamos; music by Rogelio Sosa, Kyle Dixon and Michael Stein

=== Television ===
Year	Title	Network	Notes
2016–2025	Stranger Things	Netflix	Score for the series
2018	Butterfly	ITV	Three-episode miniseries
2019	Valley of the Boom	National Geographic	Docudrama miniseries

=== Other ===
Year	Title	Format	Notes
2018	Spheres	Virtual reality series	Directed by Eliza McNitt; produced by Darren Aronofsky
2021	Convergence Station	Permanent installation	Meow Wolf, Denver
2024	Stranger Things VR	Virtual reality game	Original music by Dixon and Stein

== Awards and nominations ==
Awards and nominations received by Kyle Dixon and Michael Stein
Year	Award	Category	Nominated work	Result	Ref.
2017	Primetime Emmy Award	Outstanding Original Main Title Theme Music	Stranger Things	Won	
2017	Grammy Award	Best Score Soundtrack for Visual Media	Stranger Things, Vol. 1	Nominated	
2017	Grammy Award	Best Score Soundtrack for Visual Media	Stranger Things, Vol. 2	Nominated	
2017	ASCAP Composers' Choice Awards	TV Composer(s) of the Year	Kyle Dixon and Michael Stein for Stranger Things	Nominated	
2017	World Soundtrack Awards	Television Composer of the Year	Kyle Dixon and Michael Stein for Stranger Things	Nominated	
2018	Hollywood Music in Media Awards	Original Score – Short Film	Spheres	Nominated	
2021	Hollywood Music in Media Awards	Original Score – Independent Film	The Hole in the Fence	Nominated	
