= Primetime Emmy Award for Outstanding Original Main Title Theme Music =

Annual film award

Primetime Emmy Award for Original Main Title Theme Music
- Awarded for: Outstanding Original Main Title Theme Music
- Country: United States
- Presented by: Academy of Television Arts & Sciences
- Currently held by: Pluribus (2026)
- Website: emmys.com

This is a list of the winning and nominated programs of the Primetime Emmy Award for Outstanding Original Main Title Theme Music. In the 1980s and early 1990s, the award was presented with the "possibility of one, more than one, or no award given," resulting in several years where there were nominees without a winner.

In the following list, the first titles listed in gold are the winners; those not in gold are nominees, which are listed in alphabetical order. The years given are those in which the ceremonies took place:

== Winners and nominations ==
=== 1980s ===
Year	Program	Nominee(s)	Network
1988 (40th) (Note: As a juried award, nominees had to garner 50% approval to win the award. None of the nominees met the benchmark and no award was given.)	Beauty and the Beast	Lee Holdridge	CBS
1988 (40th)	Great Performances	John Corigliano	PBS
1988 (40th)	The Law and Harry McGraw	Richard Markowitz	CBS
1988 (40th)	thirtysomething	Stewart Levin and W. G. Snuffy Walden	ABC
1989 (41st)	Knightwatch	Stanley Clarke	ABC
1989 (41st)	Men	James Newton Howard	ABC
1989 (41st)	Paradise	Jerrold Immel	CBS
1989 (41st)	Tattingers	Jonathan Tunick	NBC
1989 (41st)	Unsub	Mike Post	NBC

=== 1990s ===
Year	Program	Nominee(s)	Network
1990 (42nd)	Carol & Company	Dan Foliart and Howard Pearl	NBC
1990 (42nd)	FM	Patrick Williams	NBC
1990 (42nd)	The Simpsons	Danny Elfman	Fox
1990 (42nd)	Twin Peaks	Angelo Badalamenti and David Lynch	ABC
1990 (42nd)	The Young Riders	John Debney	ABC
1991 (43rd)	ABC World of Discovery	Lee Holdridge	ABC
1991 (43rd)	Against the Law	Thomas Newman	Fox
1991 (43rd)	Dream On	Michael Skloff	HBO
1991 (43rd)	Hull High	Stanley Clarke, Maureen Crowe, Lawrence Edwards, Peggy Holmes, Kenny Ortega, Charles Spellman, and David Weiss	NBC
1991 (43rd)	Singer and Sons	Ray Colcord	NBC
1992 (44th)
1992 (44th)	Brooklyn Bridge	Marvin Hamlisch, Alan and Marilyn Bergman	USA
1992 (44th)	I'll Fly Away	W. G. Snuffy Walden	NBC
1992 (44th)	Major Dad	Steve Dorff	CBS
1992 (44th)	Silk Stalkings	Mike Post	CBS
1992 (44th)	The Young Indiana Jones Chronicles	Laurence Rosenthal	ABC
1993 (45th)	Star Trek: Deep Space Nine	Dennis McCarthy	Syndicated
1993 (45th)	Bob	Lee Holdridge	CBS
1993 (45th)	Bodies of Evidence	Christopher Klatman	CBS
1993 (45th)	Covington Cross	Carl Davis	ABC
1993 (45th)	Love and War	Jonathan Tunick	CBS
1993 (45th)	Picket Fences	Stewart Levin	CBS
1994 (46th)	seaQuest DSV	John Debney	NBC
1994 (46th)	Frasier	Bruce Miller and Darryl Phinnessee	NBC
1994 (46th)	Lois & Clark: The New Adventures of Superman	Jay Gruska	ABC
1994 (46th)	NYPD Blue	Mike Post	ABC
1994 (46th)	The X-Files	Mark Snow	Fox
1995 (47th)	Star Trek: Voyager	Jerry Goldsmith	UPN
1995 (47th)	Chicago Hope	Mark Isham	CBS
1995 (47th)	ER	James Newton Howard	NBC
1995 (47th)	Friends	Michael Skloff and Allee Willis	NBC
1995 (47th)	My So-Called Life	W. G. Snuffy Walden	ABC
1996 (48th)	Murder One	Mike Post	ABC
1996 (48th)	Central Park West	Tim Truman	CBS
1996 (48th)	Chicago Hope	Mark Isham	CBS
1996 (48th)	JAG	Bruce Broughton	NBC
1996 (48th)	Nowhere Man	Mark Snow	UPN
1997 (49th)	EZ Streets	Mark Isham	CBS
1997 (49th)	The Cape	John Debney	Syndicated
1997 (49th)	Crisis Center	Danny Lux	NBC
1997 (49th)	Dark Skies	Michael Hoenig	NBC
1997 (49th)	Early Edition	W. G. Snuffy Walden	CBS
1998 (50th)	Fame L.A.	Robbie Buchanan, Maribeth Derry, Richard Barton Lewis, and Tom Snow	Syndicated
1998 (50th)	Four Corners	Christopher Klatman	CBS
1998 (50th)	Earth: Final Conflict	Micky Erbe and Maribeth Solomon	Syndicated
1998 (50th)	Nothing Sacred	Mark Isham	ABC
1998 (50th)	Sessions at West 54th	Mitchell Froom	PBS
1999 (51st)	Trinity	Martin Davich	NBC
1999 (51st)	Profiler	Danny Lux	NBC
1999 (51st)	The PJs	George Clinton, Quincy Jones III, La Rita Norman, and Marie Norman	Fox
1999 (51st)	V.I.P.	Frankie Blue	Syndicated
1999 (51st)	Viva Variety	Robert Ben Garant and Glen Roven	Comedy Central

=== 2000s ===
Year	Program	Nominee(s)	Network
2000 (52nd)	The West Wing	W. G. Snuffy Walden	NBC
2000 (52nd)	Falcone	Jay Gruska	CBS
2000 (52nd)	Jack London's Call of the Wild	Hal Foxton Beckett	Animal Planet
2000 (52nd)	Jack of All Trades	Joseph LoDuca	Syndicated
2000 (52nd)	The Pretender	Velton Ray Bunch and Mark Leggett	NBC
2001 (53rd)	Gideon's Crossing	James Newton Howard	ABC
2001 (53rd)	Big Apple	Marc Bonilla	CBS
2001 (53rd)	Soul Food	Kenneth Edmonds and Al Green	Showtime
2001 (53rd)	Survivor	Russ Landau	CBS
2001 (53rd)	Thoroughbred	Michael Josephs	Animal Planet
2002 (54th)	Six Feet Under	Thomas Newman	HBO
2002 (54th)	A Day in Their Lives	Mark Leggett	History
2002 (54th)	First Monday	Bruce Broughton	CBS
2002 (54th)	Justice League	Lolita Ritmanis	Cartoon Network
2002 (54th)	Wolf Lake	David Schwartz	CBS
2003 (55th)	Monk	Jeff Beal	USA
2003 (55th)	Boomtown	Philip Giffin	NBC
2003 (55th)	Everwood	Blake Neely	The WB
2003 (55th)	Miracles	W. G. Snuffy Walden and Joseph Williams	ABC
2003 (55th)	Penn and Teller: Bullshit!	Gary Stockdale	Showtime
2004 (56th)	Monk	Randy Newman	USA
2004 (56th)	Deadwood	David Schwartz	HBO
2004 (56th)	Monster House	Daniel Mackenzie	Discovery
2004 (56th)	Nip/Tuck	Jeffrey Cain, Cedric Lemoyne, and Gregory Slay	FX
2004 (56th)	Two and a Half Men	Lee Aronsohn, Grant Geissman, and Chuck Lorre	CBS
2005 (57th)	Desperate Housewives	Danny Elfman	ABC
2005 (57th)	Foster's Home for Imaginary Friends	James Venable	Cartoon Network
2005 (57th)	Huff	W. G. Snuffy Walden	Showtime
2005 (57th)	Justice League Unlimited	Michael McCuistion	Cartoon Network
2005 (57th)	Stargate Atlantis	Joel Goldsmith	Sci Fi
2006 (58th)	Masters of Horror	Edward Shearmur	Showtime
2006 (58th)	Get Ed	Amin Bhatia and Ari Posner	Toon Disney
2006 (58th)	Over There	Chris Gerolmo	FX
2006 (58th)	Prison Break	Ramin Djawadi	Fox
2006 (58th)	Rome	Jeff Beal	HBO
2007 (59th)	The Tudors	Trevor Morris	Showtime
2007 (59th)	Dexter	Rolfe Kent	Showtime
2007 (59th)	Hu$tle	Simon Rogers	AMC
2007 (59th)	On the Lot	Mark Williams and Jeff Lippencott	Fox
2007 (59th)	30 Rock	Jeff Richmond	NBC
2008 (60th)	Pirate Master	Russ Landau	CBS
2008 (60th)	Canterbury's Law	Tree Adams	Fox
2008 (60th)	Kid Nation	Jeff Lippencott and Mark Williams	CBS
2008 (60th)	Phineas and Ferb	Dan Povenmire, Jeff "Swampy" Marsh, Michael Hirano Culross, Carl Hill Williams, and Michael Walker	Disney
2008 (60th)	Saving Grace	Eric "Everlast" Schrody	TNT
2009 (61st)	Great Performances	John Williams	PBS
2009 (61st)	The Mole	David Michael Frank	ABC
2009 (61st)	Sons of Anarchy	Bob Thiele, Dave Kushner, Curtis Stigers, and Kurt Sutter	FX
2009 (61st)	Story Makers	Bill Sherman	AMC
2009 (61st)	United States of Tara	Tim DeLaughter	Showtime

=== 2010s ===
Year	Program	Nominee(s)	Network
2010 (62nd)
2010 (62nd)	Nurse Jackie	Lisa Coleman and Wendy Melvoin	Showtime
2010 (62nd)	Human Target	Bear McCreary	Fox
2010 (62nd)	Justified	Jason Keaton and Oscar Owens	FX
2010 (62nd)	Legend of the Seeker (Note: In 2010, Gaby Moreno and Vincent Jones were nominated for the NBC sitcom Parks and Recreation. After learning the same theme music had been submitted for the show the previous year, the theme was ruled ineligible and sixth place finisher Joseph LoDuca received the nomination.)	Joseph LoDuca	Syndicated
2010 (62nd)	Warehouse 13	Edward Rogers	Syfy
2011 (63rd)
2011 (63rd)	The Borgias	Trevor Morris	Showtime
2011 (63rd)	Any Human Heart	Dan Jones	PBS
2011 (63rd)	Camelot	Jeff Danna and Mychael Danna	Starz
2011 (63rd)	Episodes	Mark Thomas	Showtime
2011 (63rd)	The Kennedys	Sean Callery	Reelz
2011 (63rd)	Mildred Pierce	Carter Burwell	HBO
2012 (64th)
2012 (64th)	Page Eight	Paul Englishby	PBS
2012 (64th)	Great Expectations	Martin Phipps	PBS
2012 (64th)	Hell on Wheels	Gustavo Santaolalla	AMC
2012 (64th)	Homeland	Sean Callery	Showtime
2012 (64th)	Touch	Lisa Coleman and Wendy Melvoin	Fox
2013 (65th)
2013 (65th)	Da Vinci's Demons	Bear McCreary	Starz
2013 (65th)	The Americans	Nathan Barr	FX
2013 (65th)	Copper	Brian Keane	BBC America
2013 (65th)	Elementary	Sean Callery	CBS
2013 (65th)	Hemlock Grove	Nathan Barr	Netflix
2013 (65th)	House of Cards	Jeff Beal	Netflix
2014 (66th)
2014 (66th)	Cosmos: A Spacetime Odyssey	Alan Silvestri	Fox
2014 (66th)	Black Sails	Bear McCreary	Starz
2014 (66th)	Magic City	Daniele Luppi	Starz
2014 (66th)	Sleepy Hollow	Brian Tyler and Robert Lydecker	Fox
2014 (66th)	The Spoils of Babylon	Andrew Feltenstein and John Nau	IFC
2015 (67th)
2015 (67th)	Transparent	Dustin O'Halloran	Amazon
2015 (67th)	The Dovekeepers	Jeff Beal	CBS
2015 (67th)	Marco Polo	Daniele Luppi	Netflix
2015 (67th)	Penny Dreadful	Abel Korzeniowski	Showtime
2015 (67th)	Texas Rising	Bruce Broughton and John Debney	History
2015 (67th)	Tyrant	Jeff Danna and Mychael Danna	FX
2016 (68th)
2016 (68th)	Marvel's Jessica Jones	Sean Callery	Netflix
2016 (68th)	Crazy Ex-Girlfriend	Rachel Bloom and Adam Schlesinger	The CW
2016 (68th)	Narcos	Rodrigo Amarante	Netflix
2016 (68th)	The Night Manager	Victor Reyes	AMC
2016 (68th)	Sense8	Johnny Klimek and Tom Tykwer	Netflix
2016 (68th)	The Whispers	Robert Duncan	ABC
2017 (69th)
2017 (69th)	Stranger Things	Michael Stein and Kyle Dixon	Netflix
2017 (69th)	Feud: Bette and Joan	Mac Quayle	FX
2017 (69th)	Genius	Hans Zimmer and Lorne Balfe	Nat Geo
2017 (69th)	The Good Fight	David Buckley	CBS All Access
2017 (69th)	Victoria	Martin Phipps	PBS
2017 (69th)	Westworld	Ramin Djawadi	HBO
2018 (69th)
2018 (69th)	Godless	Carlos Rafael Rivera	Netflix
2018 (69th)	The Last Tycoon	Mychael Danna	Prime Video
2018 (69th)	Marvel's The Defenders	John Paesano	Netflix
2018 (69th)	The Putin Interviews	Jeff Beal	Showtime
2018 (69th)	Somebody Feed Phil	Mike Olson, Bridget Kearney, Mike Calabrese and Rachael Price	Netflix
2018 (69th)	The Tick	Chris Bacon	Prime Video
2019 (71st)
2019 (71st)	Succession	Nicholas Britell	HBO
2019 (71st)	Castle Rock	Thomas Newman	Hulu
2019 (71st)	Crazy Ex-Girlfriend	Rachel Bloom, Jack Dolgen and Adam Schlesinger	The CW
2019 (71st)	Good Omens	David Arnold	Prime Video
2019 (71st)	Our Planet	Steven Price	Netflix

=== 2020s ===
Year	Program	Nominee(s)	Network
2020 (72nd)
2020 (72nd)	Hollywood	Nathan Barr	Netflix
2020 (72nd)	Carnival Row	Nathan Barr	Prime Video
2020 (72nd)	Defending Jacob	Ólafur Arnalds	Apple TV+
2020 (72nd)	Unorthodox	Antonio Gambale	Netflix
2020 (72nd)	Why We Hate	Laura Karpman	Discovery
2020 (72nd)	Wu-Tang: An American Saga	RZA	Hulu
2021 (73rd)
2021 (73rd)	The Flight Attendant	Blake Neely	HBO Max
2021 (73rd)	Allen v. Farrow	Michael Abels	HBO
2021 (73rd)	Bridgerton	Kris Bowers and Michael Dean Parsons	Netflix
2021 (73rd)	Ted Lasso	Tom Howe and Marcus Mumford	Apple TV+
2021 (73rd)	WandaVision	Kristen Anderson-Lopez and Robert Lopez	Disney+
2022 (74th)
2022 (74th)	The White Lotus	Cristobal Tapia de Veer	HBO
2022 (74th)	Loki	Natalie Holt	Disney+
2022 (74th)	Only Murders in the Building	Siddhartha Khosla	Hulu
2022 (74th)	Severance	Theodore Shapiro	Apple TV+
2022 (74th)	Squid Game	Jung Jae-il	Netflix
2023 (75th)
2023 (75th)	Wednesday	Danny Elfman	Netflix
2023 (75th)	Andor	Nicholas Britell	Disney+
2023 (75th)	Guillermo del Toro's Cabinet of Curiosities	Holly Amber Church	Netflix
2023 (75th)	The Lord of the Rings: The Rings of Power	Howard Shore	Prime Video
2023 (75th)	Ms. Marvel	Laura Karpman	Disney+
2024 (76th)
2024 (76th)	Palm Royale	Jeff Toyne	Apple TV+
2024 (76th)	Feud: Capote vs. The Swans	Thomas Newman	FX
2024 (76th)	Lessons in Chemistry	Carlos Rafael Rivera	Apple TV+
2024 (76th)	Masters of the Air	Blake Neely	Apple TV+
2024 (76th)	Shōgun	Atticus Ross, Leopold Ross and Nick Chuba	FX
2025 (77th)
2025 (77th)	The White Lotus	Cristobal Tapia de Veer	HBO
2025 (77th)	Dept. Q	Carlos Rafael Rivera and Scott Frank	Netflix
2025 (77th)	Dune: Prophecy	Volker Bertelmann	HBO
2025 (77th)	Lazarus	Kamasi Washington	Adult Swim
2025 (77th)	The Residence	Mark Mothersbaugh	Netflix
2025 (77th)	Your Friends & Neighbors	Dominic Lewis and Hamilton Leithauser	Apple TV+
2026 (78th)
2026 (78th)	Pluribus	Dave Porter	Apple TV
2026 (78th)	All Her Fault	Jeff Beal	Peacock
2026 (78th)	The Beast in Me	Sean Callery	Netflix
2026 (78th)	The 'Burbs	Michael Abels	Peacock
2026 (78th)	Murderbot	Amanda Jones	Apple TV

== Individuals with multiple wins ==
2 wins

- Danny Elfman
- Trevor Morris
- Cristobal Tapia de Veer

== Individuals with multiple nominations ==
7 nominations

- W. G. Snuffy Walden

6 nominations

- Jeff Beal

5 nominations

- Sean Callery

4 nominations

- Nathan Barr
- John Debney
- Mark Isham
- Thomas Newman
- Mike Post

3 nominations

- Bruce Broughton
- Mychael Danna
- Danny Elfman
- Lee Holdridge
- James Newton Howard
- Bear McCreary
- Blake Neely
- Carlos Rafael Rivera

2 nominations

- Michael Abels
- Rachel Bloom
- Nicholas Britell
- Stanley Clarke
- Lisa Coleman
- Jeff Danna
- Ramin Djawadi
- Jay Gruska
- Laura Karpman
- Christopher Klatman
- Russ Landau
- Mark Leggett
- Stewart Levin
- Jeff Lippencott
- Joseph LoDuca
- Daniele Luppi
- Danny Lux
- Wendy Melvoin
- Trevor Morris
- Martin Phipps
- Adam Schlesinger
- David Schwartz
- Michael Skloff
- Mark Snow
- Cristobal Tapia de Veer
- Jonathan Tunick
- Mark Williams

== Programs with multiple wins ==
2 wins

- Monk
- The White Lotus

== Programs with multiple nominations ==
2 nominations

- Chicago Hope
- Crazy Ex-Girlfriend
- Feud
- Great Performances
- Monk
- The White Lotus
