= Marguerite Bourgeoys Museum (Montreal) =

Biographical museum in Montreal, Quebec

Coordinates: 45°30′36″N 73°33′04″W

Marguerite Bourgeoys Museum (Montreal) Musée Marguerite Bourgeoys (Montréal)
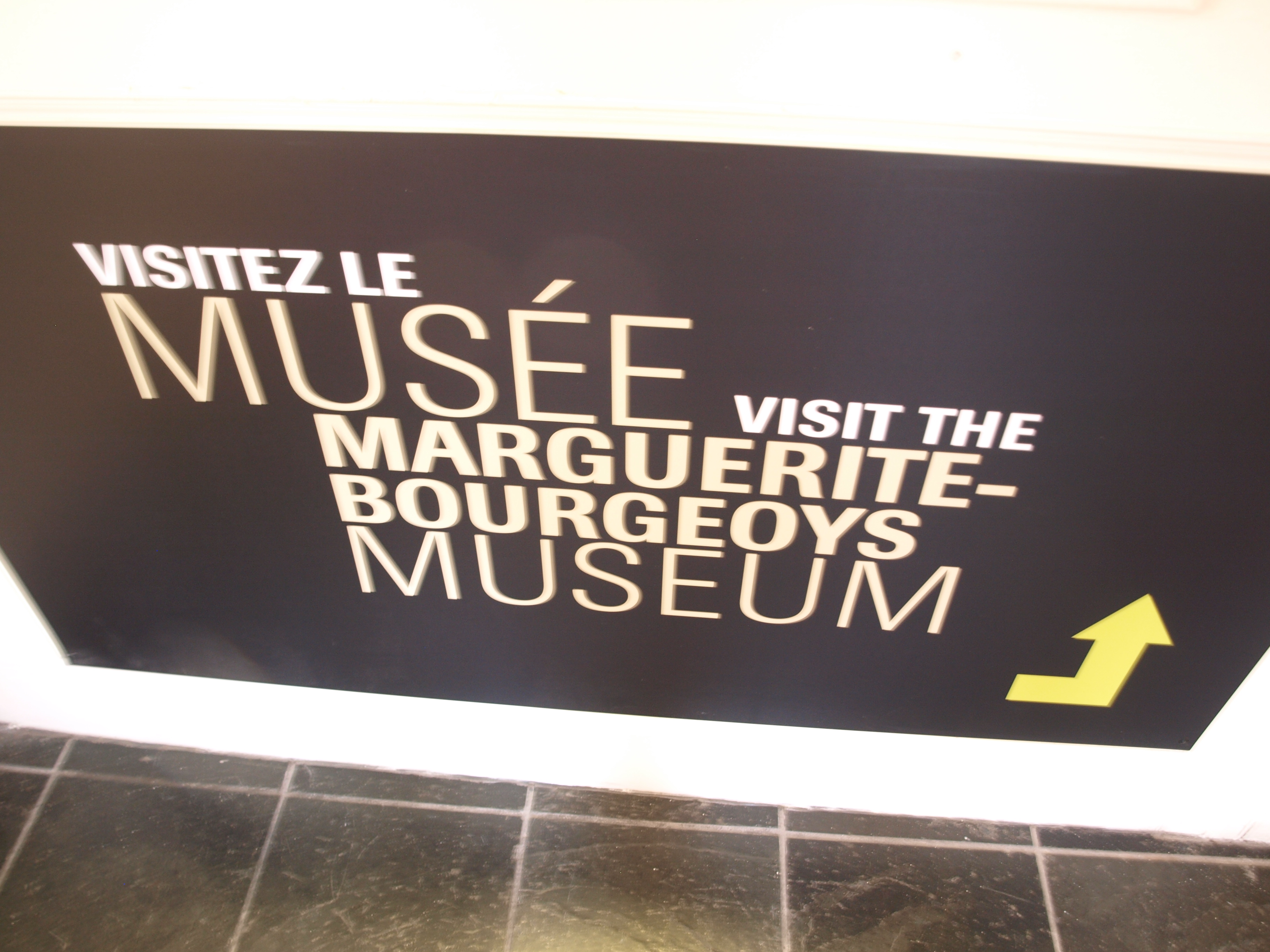
- Established: May 24, 1998
- Location: 400, rue Saint-Paul Est; Montreal, Quebec; H2Y 1H4

Opened on May 24, 1998, the Marguerite Bourgeoys Museum (French: Musée Marguerite Bourgeoys) is located on the shores of the Saint Lawrence River in the historic centre of Old Montreal in Montreal, Quebec, Canada. Exhibits focus on Marguerite Bourgeoys, Montreal's first teacher and founder of the Notre-Dame-de-Bon-Secours Chapel, who lived during the 17th century. Displays highlight her accomplishments that recall the great courage of the early colonists who built Montreal.

In addition, visitors can tour the Notre-Dame-de-Bon-Secours Chapel, to which the museum is connected. This tri-centenary chapel of pilgrimage is Montreal's first and oldest chapel of pilgrimage.

== Mission ==
Both the Marguerite Bourgeoys Museum and Notre-Dame-de-Bon-Secours Chapel open a window onto Montreal's heritage and religious art, witness to the faith of its ancestors.

They also present the life and work of Marguerite Bourgeoys, Montreal's first teacher and founder of the chapel, in the hope of keeping the charism of this woman alive.

Finally, Notre-Dame-de-Bon-Secours Chapel is a place of prayer, worship and pilgrimage.

== Collection ==
The objective of the museum is to conserve, document and showcase sacred objects, works of art and other physical witnesses to the religious, social, cultural and educational history of Notre-Dame-de-Bon-Secours Chapel as well as objects connected to the life and work of Marguerite Bourgeoys.

The permanent collection of Notre-Dame-de-Bon-Secours Chapel and the Marguerite Bourgeoys Museum includes works on paper of contemporary artists, paintings, sculptures, books, relics and medals and a variety of objects connected to the school.

Moreover, the museum is the guardian of collections of the Sulpicians, the Congrégation de Notre-Dame and the ministère de la Culture et des Communications. These collections include the works of art and objects in the chapel, objects connected to the life of Marguerite Bourgeoys and to the Congrégation de Notre-Dame, to the teaching of the arts and finally archaeological objects.

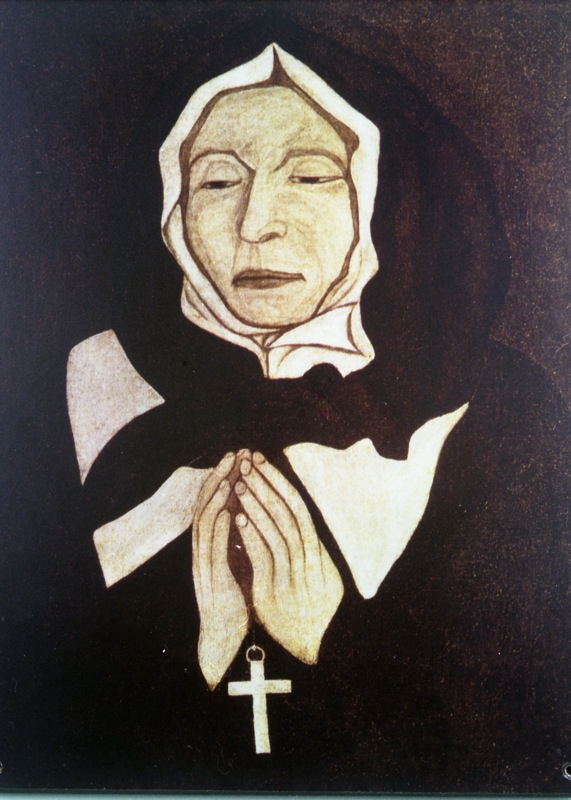
Marguerite Bourgeoys
by Pierre Le Ber, 1700

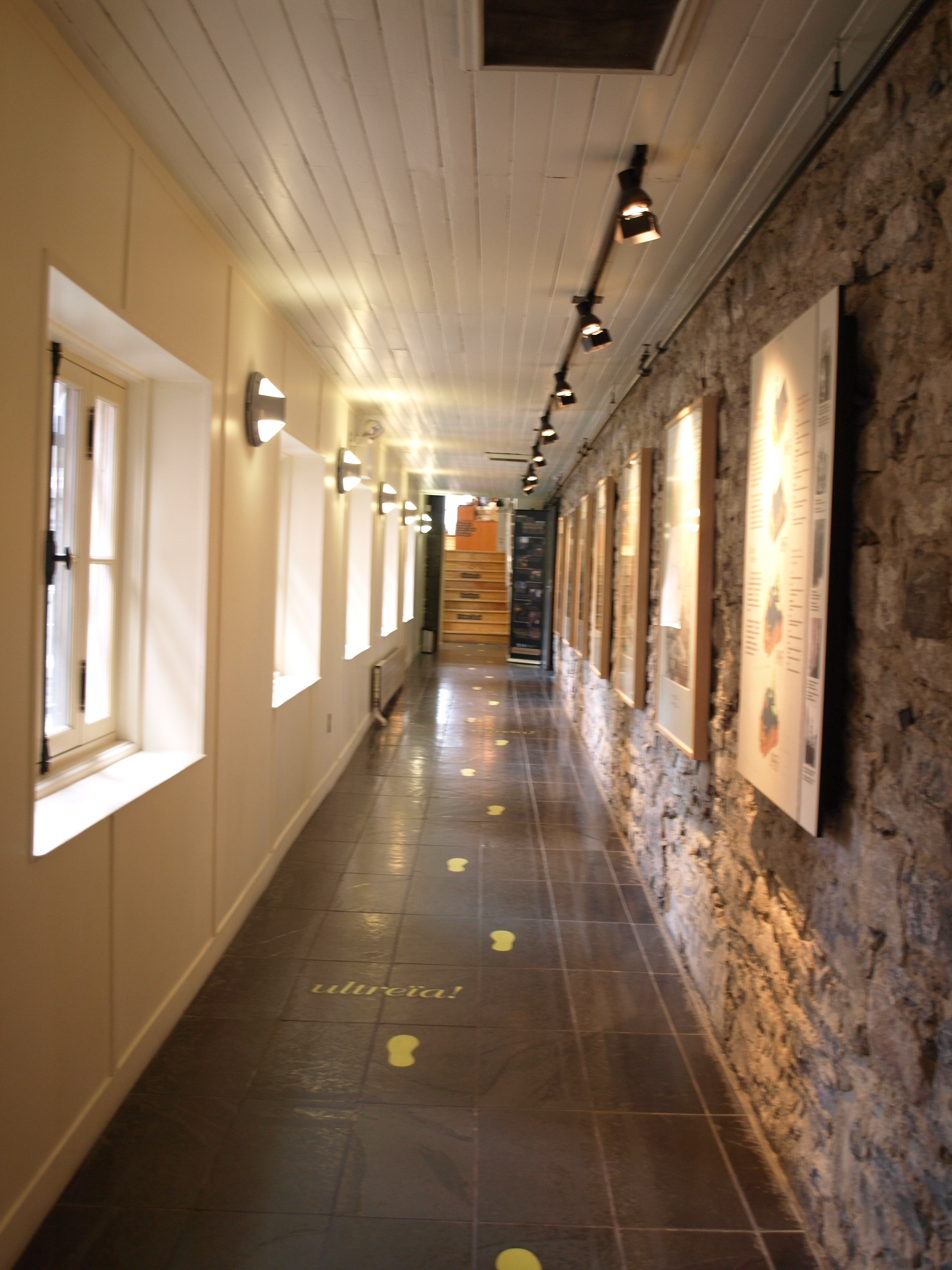
Interior view of Marguerite Bourgeoys Museum (Montreal)

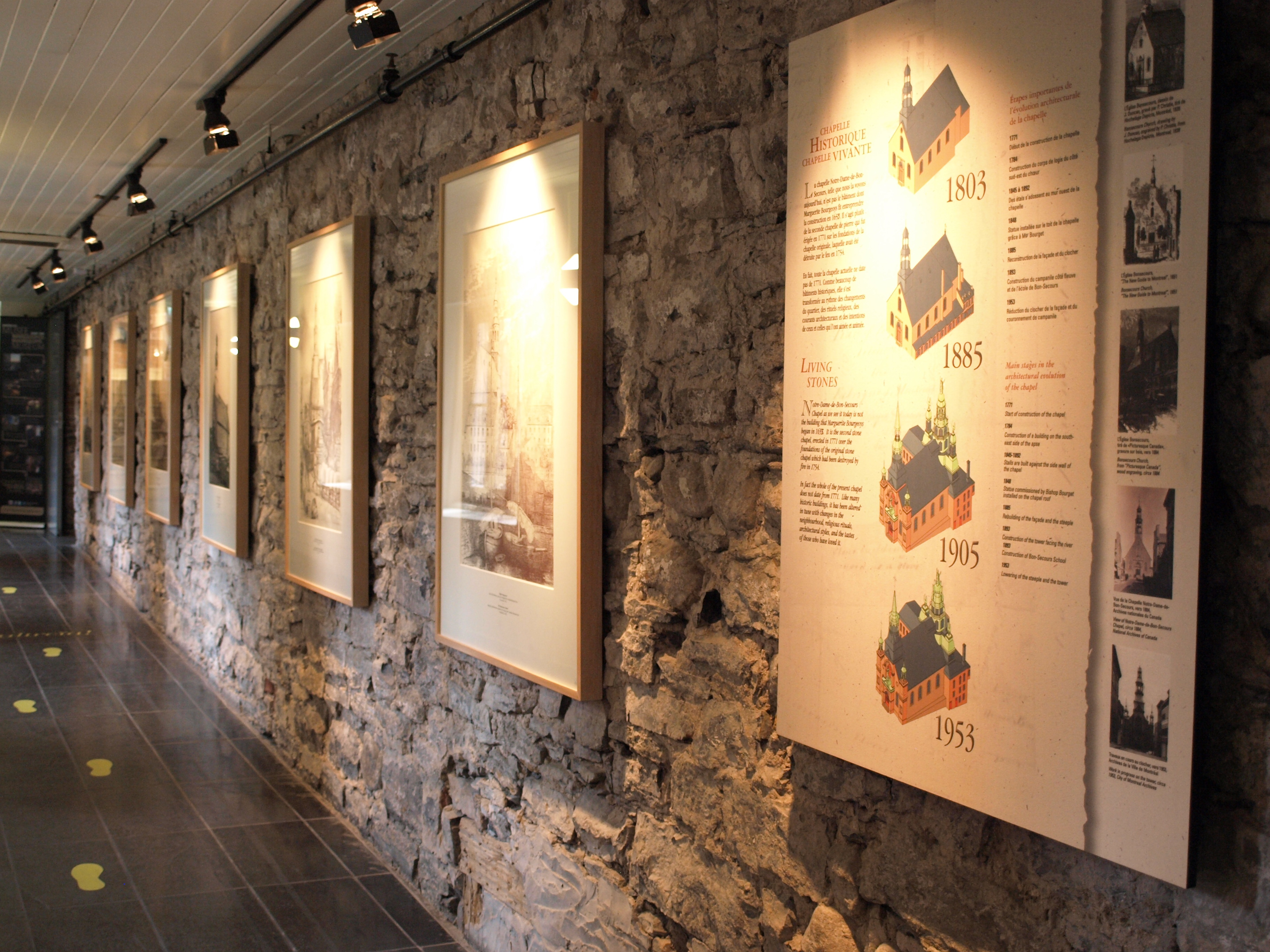
Interior view of Marguerite Bourgeoys Museum (Montreal)

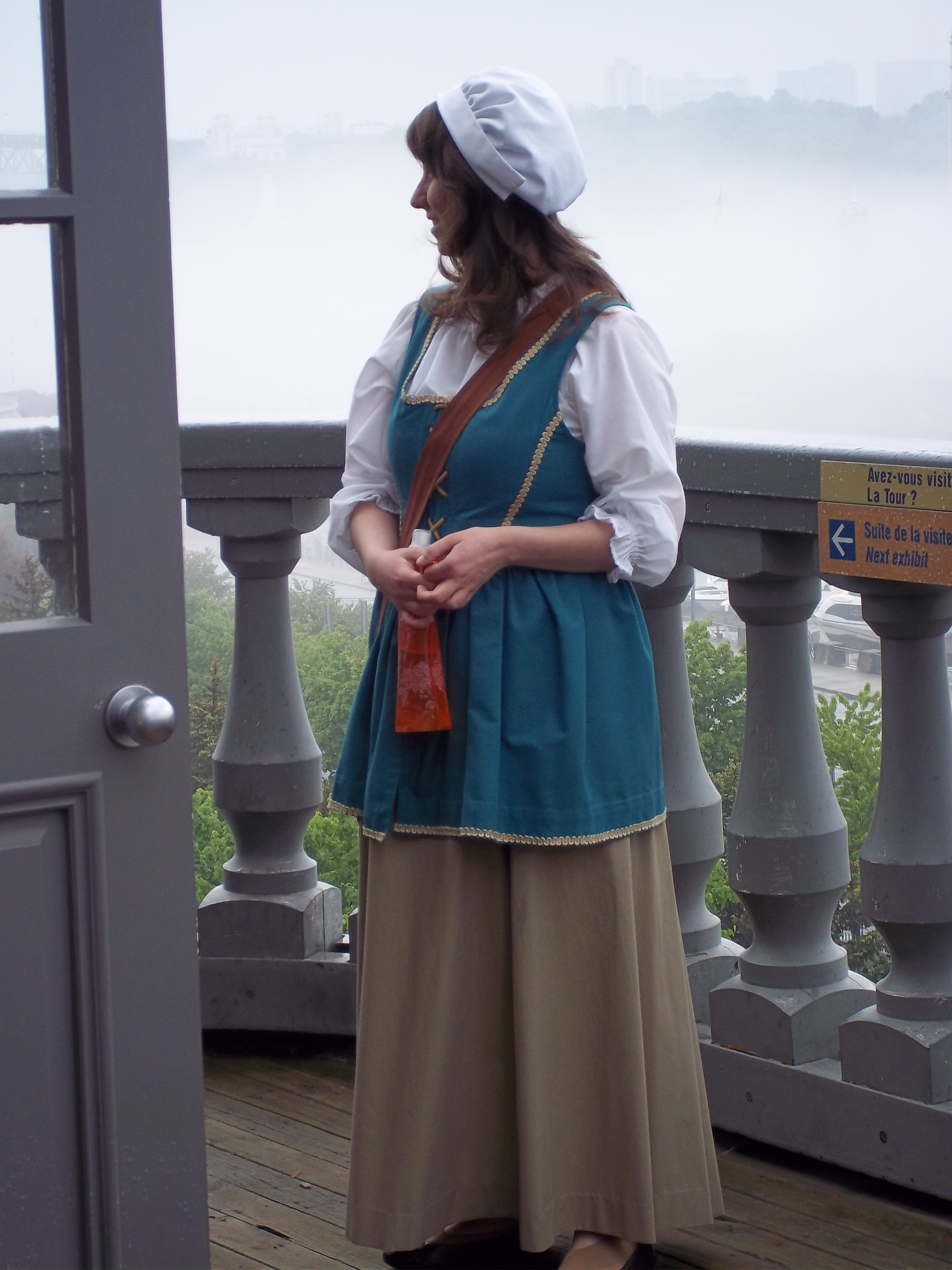
Guide at Marguerite Bourgeoys Museum (Montreal)

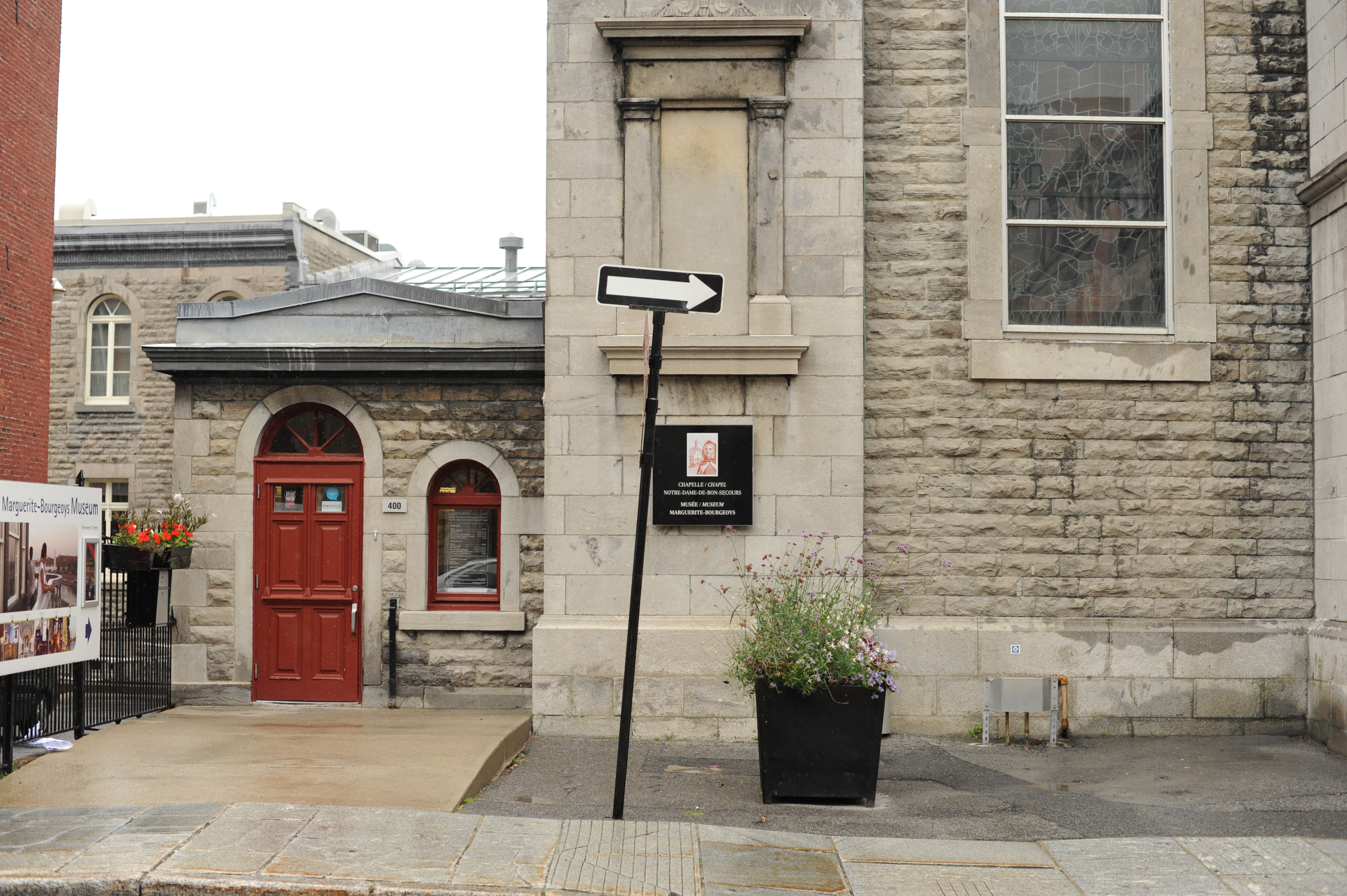
Marguerite Bourgeoys Museum (Montreal)

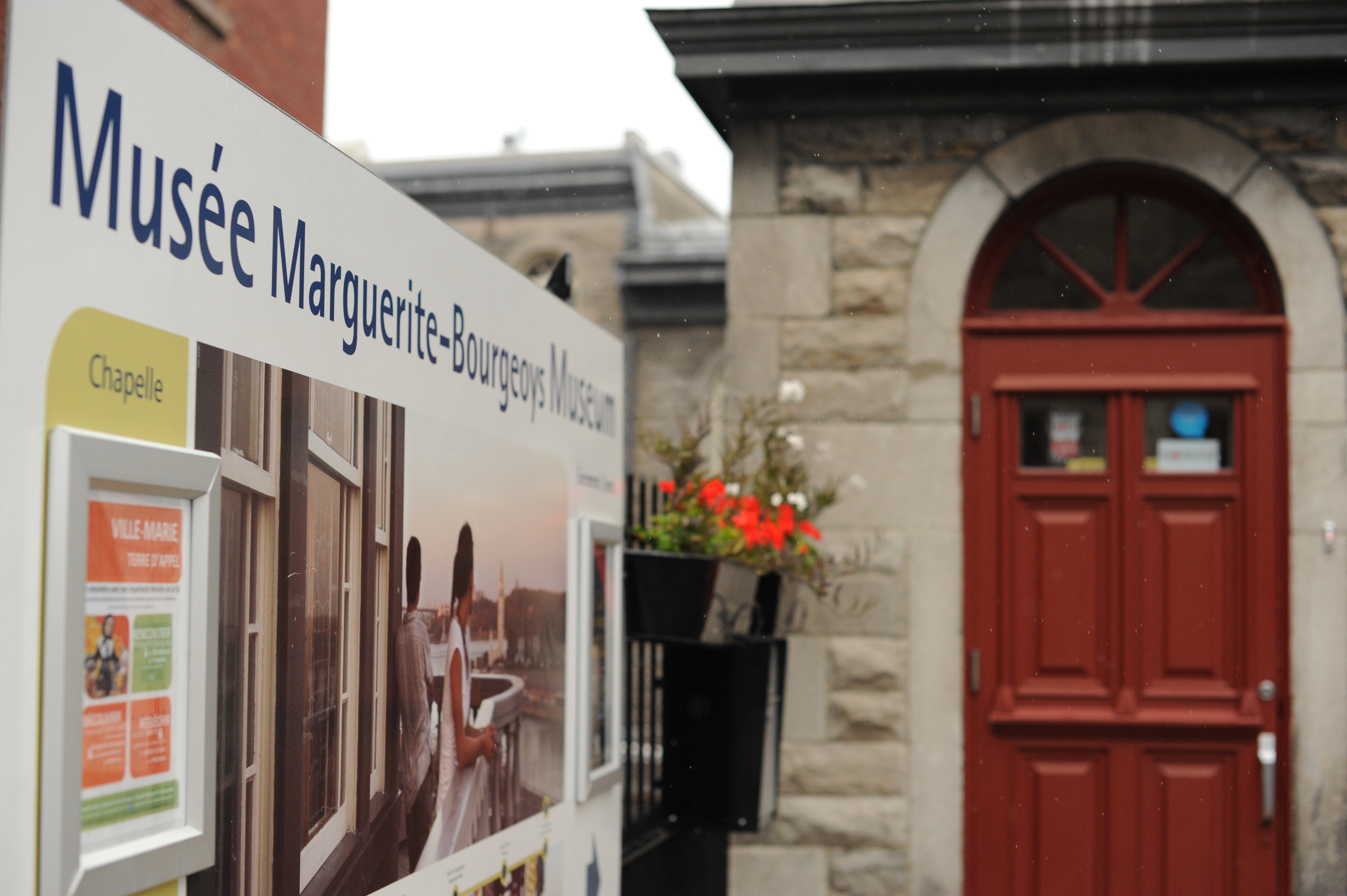
Exterior view of Marguerite Bourgeoys Museum (Montreal)

== Archaeological site ==
Located under the nave of the chapel and accessible through the crypt, the archaeological site of the Marguerite Bourgeoys Museum houses surprising discoveries. During the 1996-1997 dig, the archaeologists uncovered the remains of Montreal's first stone chapel founded by Marguerite Bourgeoys in 1675. Constructed in fieldstone, the chapel's foundations are precisely outlined close to remains of First Nations sites among the oldest found in Old Montreal.

== Recognition for a museum ==
In 2002, the Marguerite Bourgeoys Museum accumulated significant honours. First, the Prix Ulysse of Tourism Montreal recognized the development and innovation of the Marguerite Bourgeoys Museum in the category of Tourist Attraction – 100 000 visitors or less. In fact, the Marguerite Bourgeoys Museum was singled out for the diversity and quality of its cultural activities and for the beauty of the site.

Then, the Marguerite Bourgeoys Museum / Notre-Dame-de-Bon-Secours Chapel received the prestigious Phoenix Prize of the American Society of Travel Writers for the renovations and the archaeological research carried out between 1996 and 1998 that made this site an important centre of Montreal's history and heritage
