= Primordial soup (disambiguation) =

The primordial soup is the set of conditions under which life on the Earth might have begun.

Primordial soup may also refer to:

- Primordial Soup (board game)
- Primordial Soup (studio)
