= Miles Greenberg =

Performance Artist and Sculptor

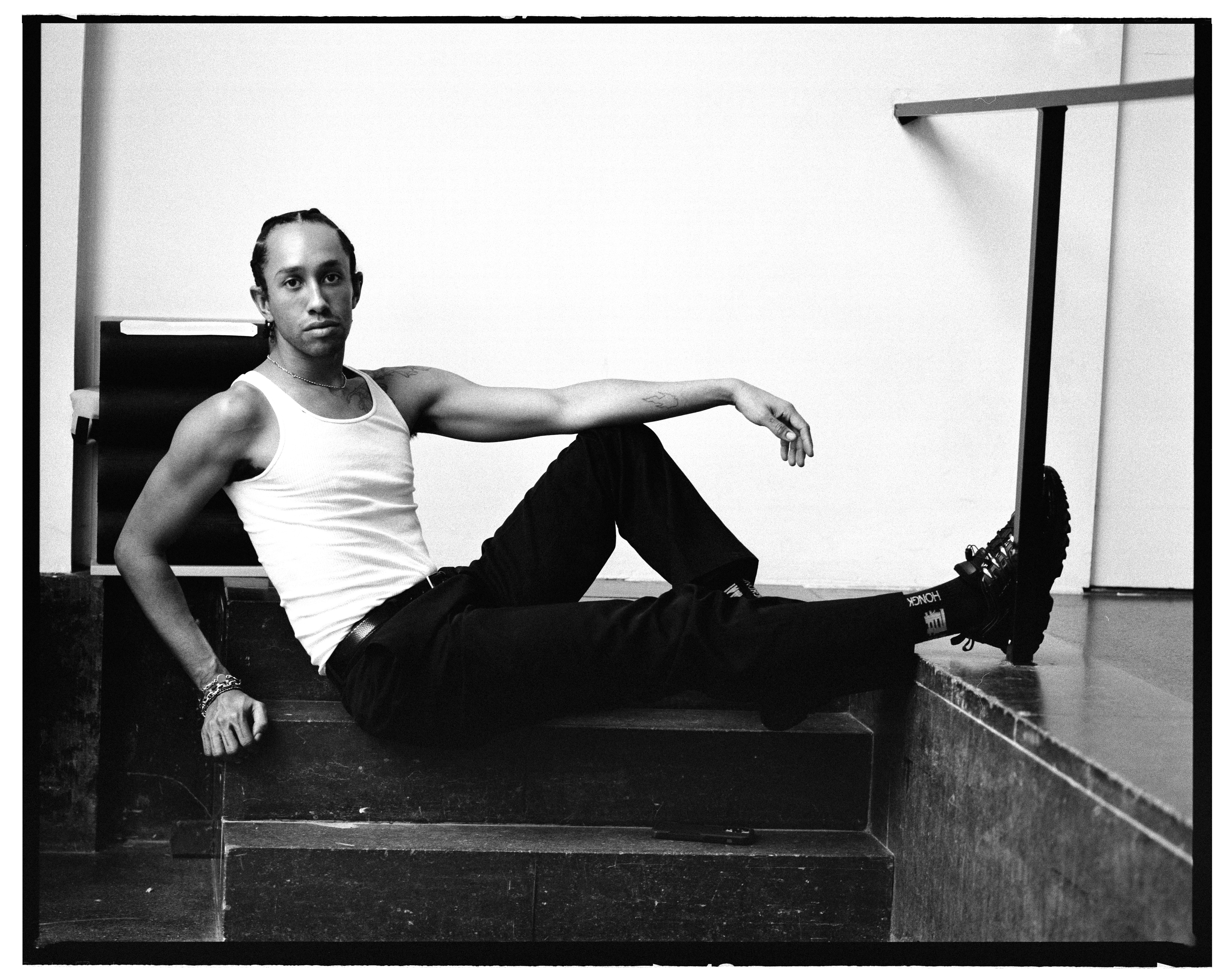
- Citizenship: Canada
- Occupations: Performance artist and sculptor
- Website: https://www.milesgreenberg.com/

Notes
- Portrait credit: Eva Roefs

Miles Greenberg (born October 23, 1997) is a Canadian performance artist and sculptor who lives and works between New York City and Reykjavík. His work is characterized by large-scale, immersive installations and durational performances that explore the physical body in space, often emphasizing themes related to the African diaspora and queer identity. Greenberg has exhibited internationally at institutions such as the Louvre (Paris, France), the New Museum (New York, USA), and the Neue Nationalgalerie (Berlin, Germany).

== Early life and education ==
Greenberg was born in Montreal, Quebec, Canada, to film producer Phoebe Greenberg and Canadian television personality Michael Williams. He was raised by his mother, who is of Jewish Ukrainian and Brazilian descent; his father is African-American. Through his mother, he is a member of one of Canada's wealthiest families, owners of Ottawa real estate developer Minto Group. After completing secondary school in 2015, Greenberg briefly attended Dawson College but left after four weeks. He then engaged in experimental performance and drag in Montreal nightclubs. At age seventeen, he embarked on a four-year independent research project studying movement and architecture as they relate to Black bodies.

== Career ==
Greenberg's artistic practice centers on the human form, scrutinized through durational performances that test physical and emotional limits. His installations are activated with performances that invoke the body as sculptural material, aiming to make visible the poetics of the human form. These performances are often captured in real-time to generate video works and sculptures.

He has worked under the mentorship of Édouard Lock, Robert Wilson, and Marina Abramović and has been an artist in residence at Fountainhead Arts, Miami (2023); La Manutention at Palais de Tokyo (2019), and The Watermill Center Residency, NY (2017 & 2018) among others. Greenberg has exhibited and performed at global institutions such as the Louvre (Paris, France), the New Museum (New York, USA), the Art Gallery of Ontario (Toronto, Canada), Salon 94 (New York, USA), and Galleria Continua (Les Moulins). Greenberg's work has also been included in numerous international art surveys, including the Venice Biennale, Athens Biennial, BoCA Lisbon, and the Bangkok Art Biennale

== Notable works ==
- Oysterknife (2020): A 24-hour durational performance in which Greenberg walked on a conveyor belt without breaks, exploring themes of endurance and the human body's limits.
- Late October (2020): Featured seven nude Black performers, including Greenberg, painted jet black with white contact lenses, slowly rotating for seven hours, examining themes of race and universality.
- Fountain II (2023): A six-hour performance at Pace Gallery where Greenberg and his partner stood on a pedestal, pouring artificial blood on each other, symbolizing emotional release and personal transformation.
- Étude Pour Sébastien (2023): Performed at the Louvre, Greenberg engaged in a durational piece where his skin was pierced by metal arrows, reflecting on pain and endurance.

== Artistic style and themes ==
Greenberg's work is known for its rigorous and ritualistic methodology, relying on slowness and the decay of form to heighten audience sensitivities. His performances often involve extreme physical feats, aiming to create a ritual space that invites both performer and audience to navigate emotions beyond language.

While his work incorporates elements of his Black and queer identity, Greenberg emphasizes universal themes such as love, heartbreak, and poetry, resisting reductive interpretations centered solely on race. Greenberg has also drawn on Greek mythology, referencing its widespread familiarity in Western art history to introduce new narratives around Black and queer identity.

== Recognition ==
In 2023, Greenberg was featured on Forbes' 30 Under 30 list in the Arts & Style category.
