= Notre-Dame-de-Bon-Secours Chapel =

Coordinates: 45°30′36″N 73°33′04″W

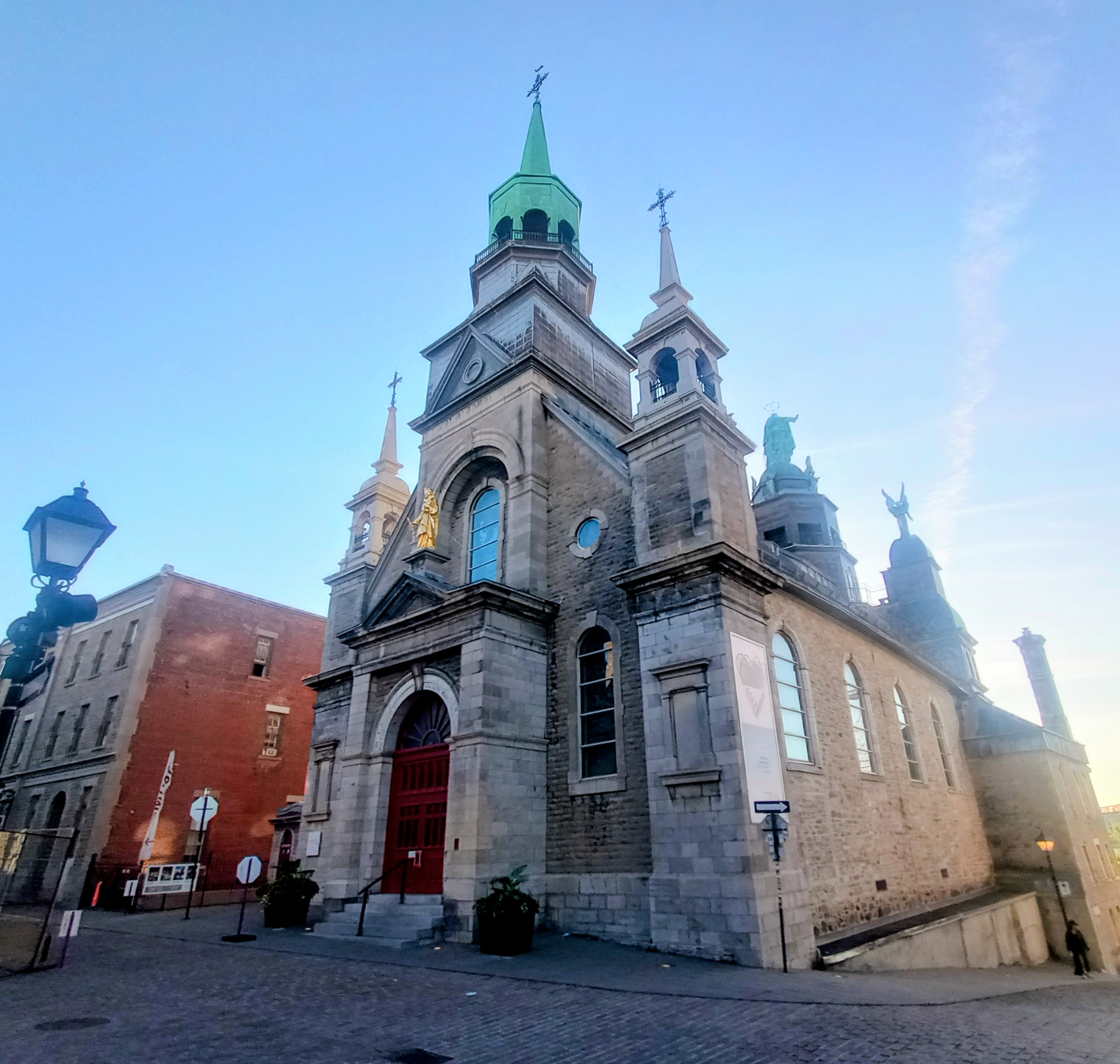
- Notre-Dame-de-Bon-Secours Chapel
- Notre-Dame-de-Bon-Secours Chapel
- Location: 400, rue Saint-Paul Est; Montreal, Quebec; H2Y 1H4
- Denomination: Roman Catholic

History
- Status: Chapel

Architecture
- Functional status: Active
- Heritage designation

Patrimoine culturel du Québec
- Type: Classified heritage immovable
- Designated: 2014-11-10
- Part of: Old Montreal
- Reference no.: 96643
- Architectural type: Norman-Gothic

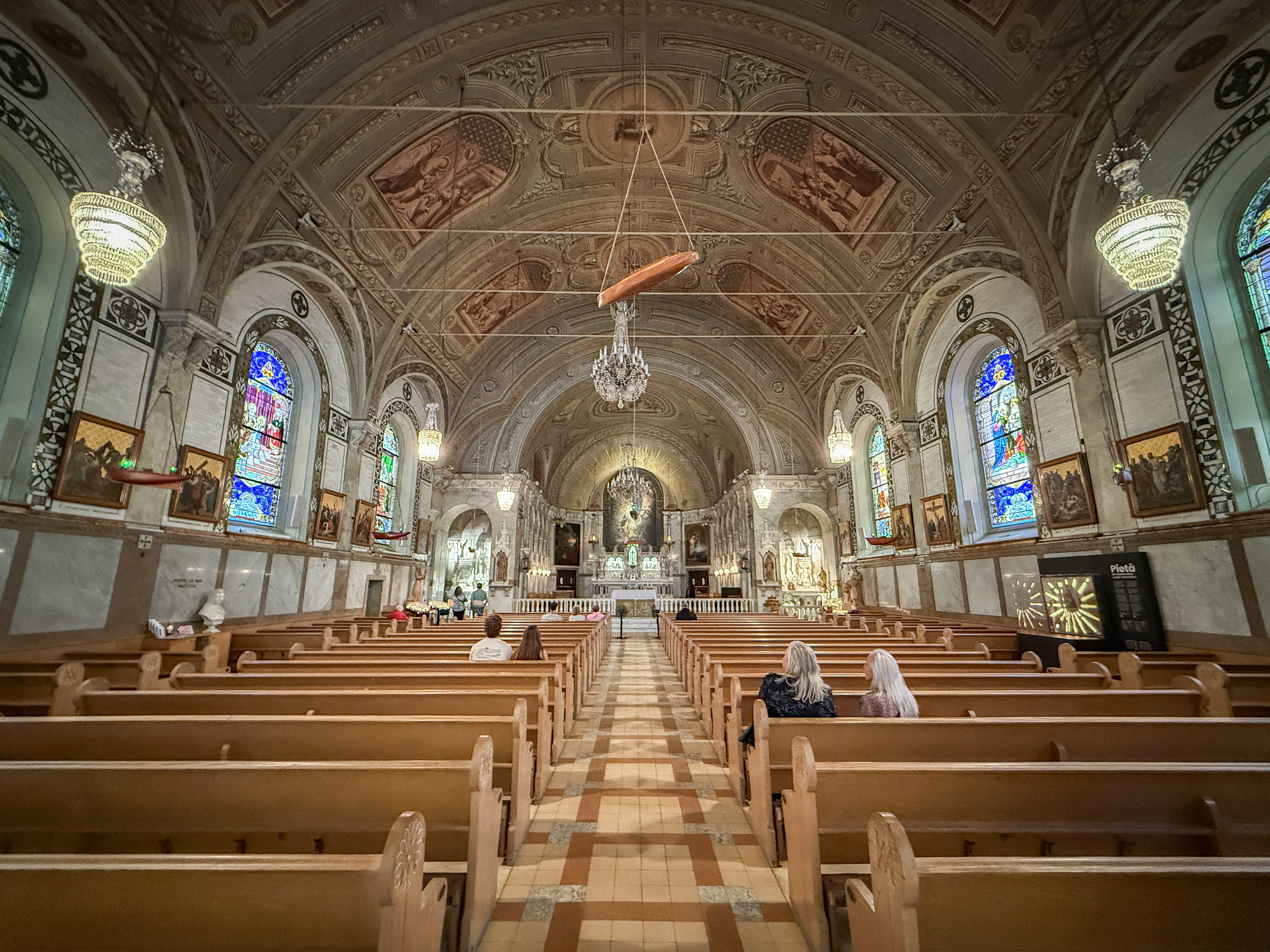
Interior view of Notre-Dame-de-Bon-Secours Chapel

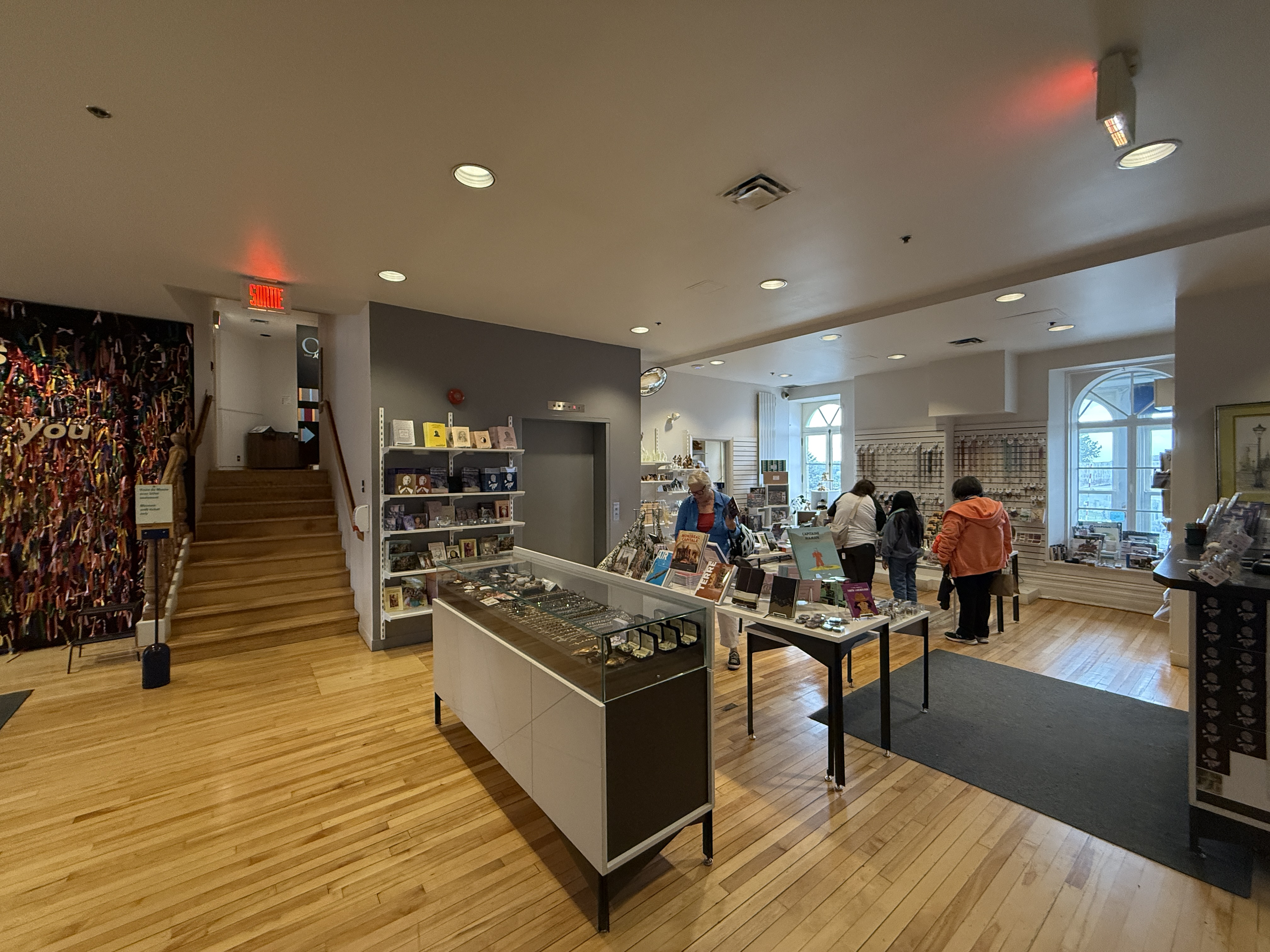
Gift shop

The Notre-Dame-de-Bon-Secours Chapel (chapelle Notre-Dame-de-Bon-Secours, "Our Lady of Good Help") is a church in the district of Old Montreal in Montreal, Quebec. One of the oldest churches in Montreal, it was built in 1771 over the ruins of an earlier chapel. The church is located at 400 Saint Paul Street East at Bonsecours Street, just north of the Bonsecours Market in the borough of Ville-Marie (Champ-de-Mars metro station).

== History ==
St. Marguerite Bourgeoys, the first teacher in the colony of Ville-Marie and the founder of the Congregation of Notre Dame, rallied the colonists to build a chapel in 1655. In 1673, returning from France, Bourgeoys brought a wooden image of Our Lady of Good Help; the stone church was completed in 1678. It burned in 1754, the reliquary and statue being rescued and placed above the entrance of the rebuilt church of 1771.

After Montreal was conquered by British forces during the French and Indian War, the church was attended by Irish and Scottish troops and families, and saw fundraising to build Saint Patrick's Church, Montreal's first anglophone Catholic parish.

In the 19th century, the chapel came to be a pilgrimage site for the sailors who arrived in the Old Port of Montreal; they would make offerings to the Virgin in gratitude for her "good help" for safe sea voyages. In 1849, Mgr. Ignace Bourget, Bishop of Montreal, gave the chapel a statue of the Virgin as Star of the Sea, which was placed atop the church overlooking the harbour. Emphasizing the connection of the chapel and the port, the chapel is often called the Sailors' Church.

The chapel now also houses the Marguerite Bourgeoys Museum, dedicated to the life of St. Marguerite Bourgeoys and to the early history of Montreal and the chapel site. Below the chapel, the crypt is being excavated as an archeological site, which visitors can see. First Nations and French colonial artifacts have been discovered, along with the foundations of the first chapel and the fortifications of the colony. The church's prominent spire can also be climbed, offering views of the Old Port and Saint Lawrence River. In 2005, Marguerite Bourgeoys's mortal remains were brought back to the church, where she now lies in the sanctuary.

== Gallery ==
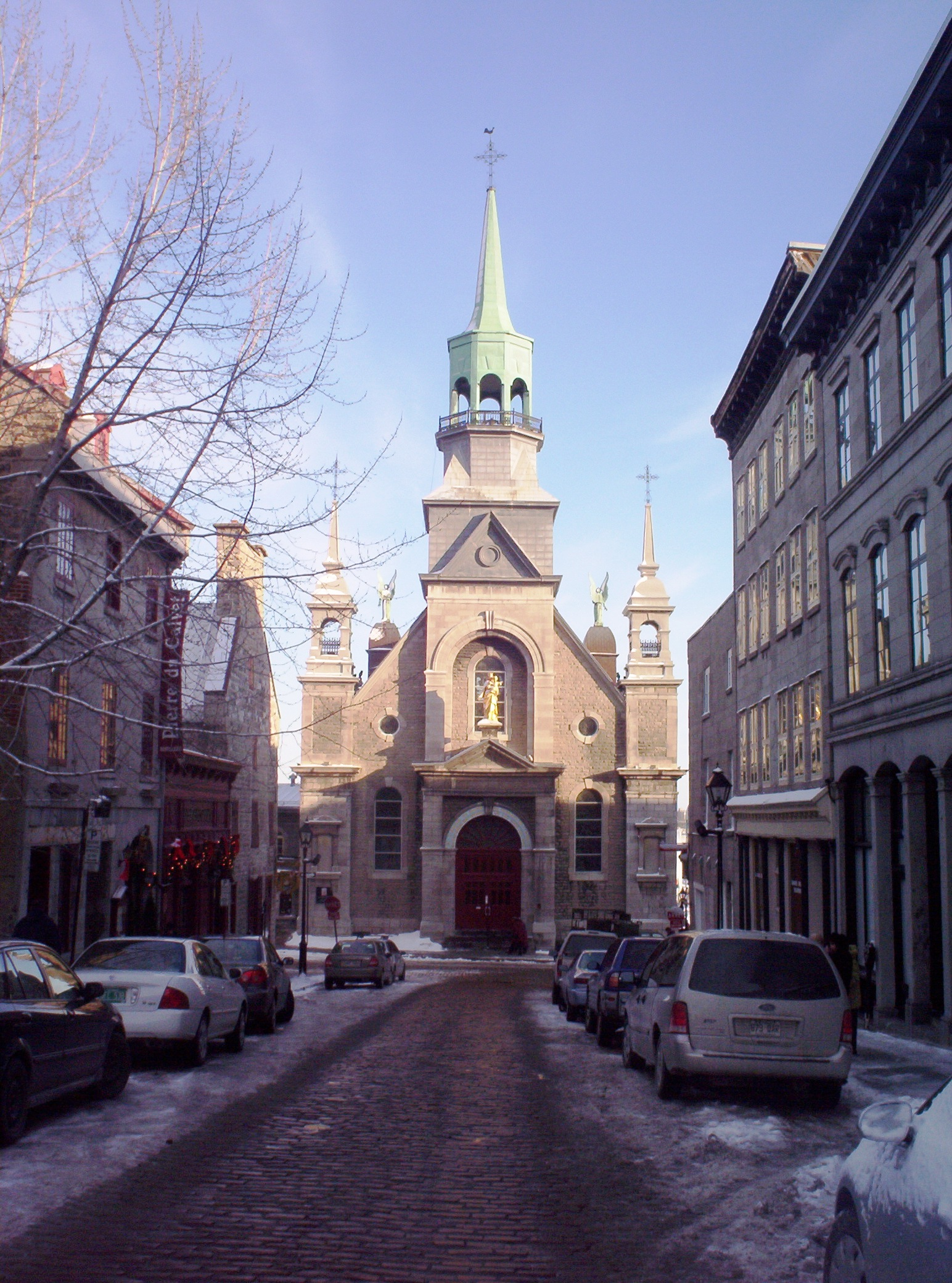
Exterior view of Notre-Dame-de-Bon-Secours Chapel, Montreal, Quebec

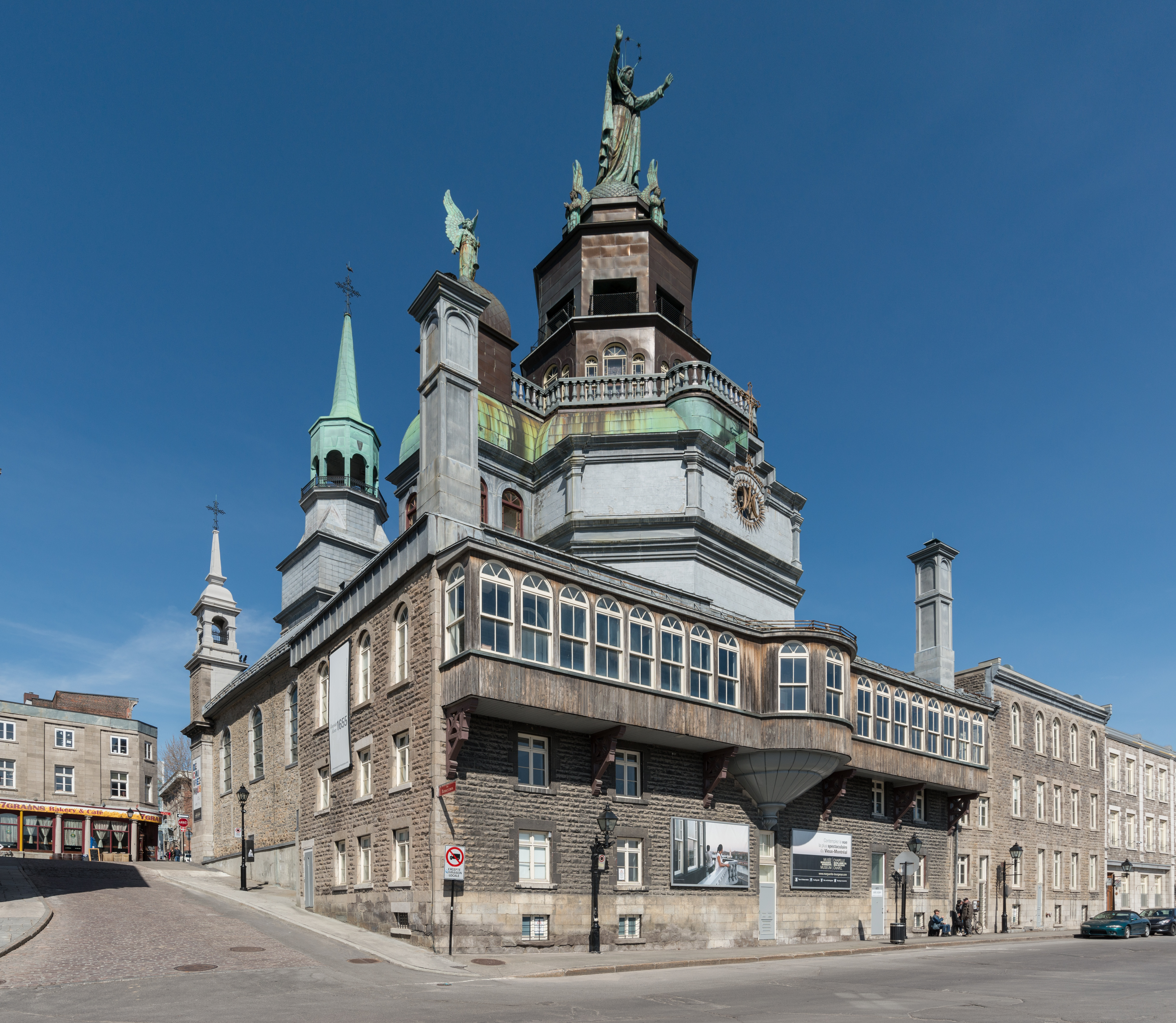
Exterior view of Notre-Dame-de-Bon-Secours Chapel, Old Port side, Montreal, Quebec

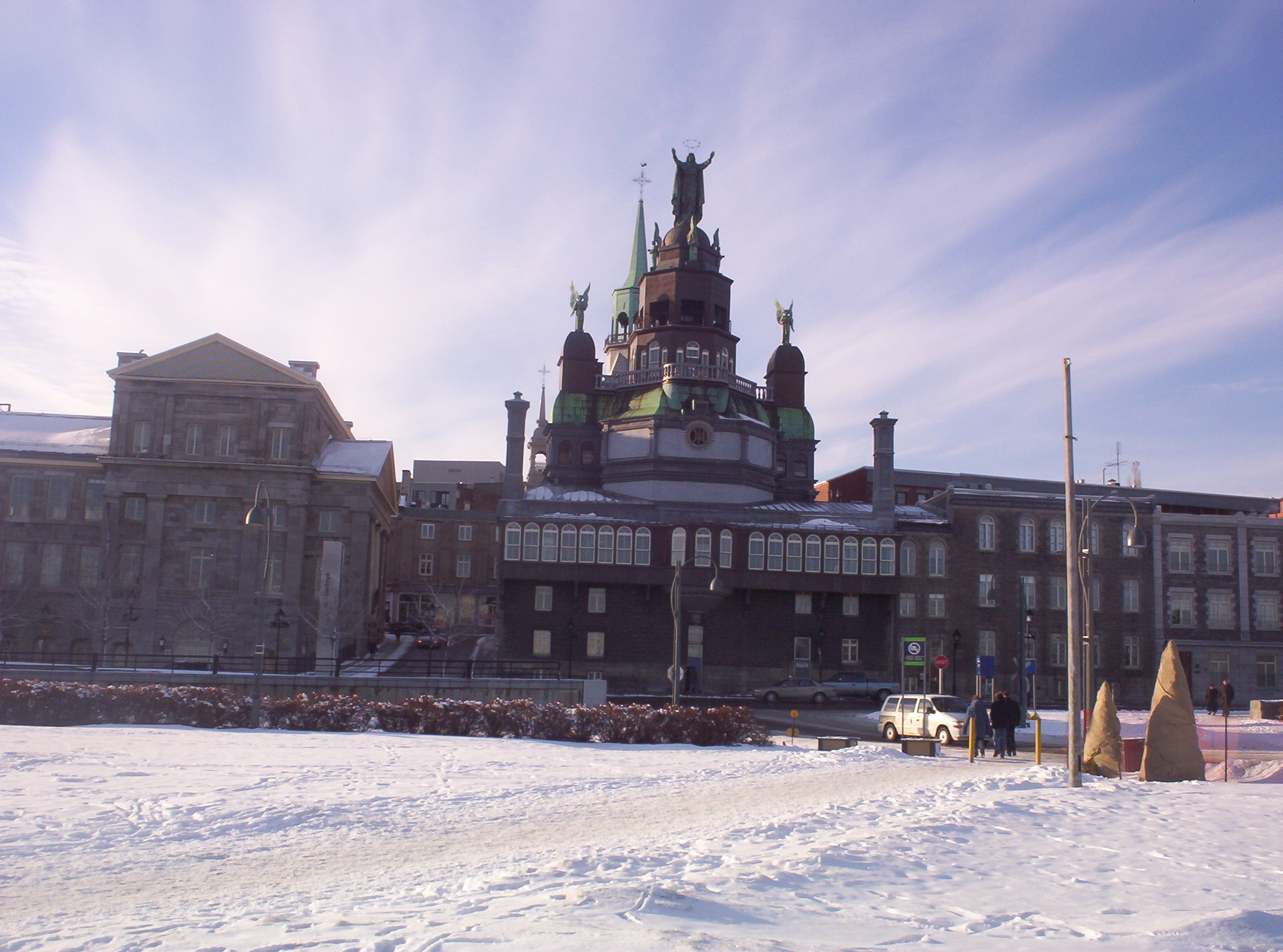
Exterior view of Notre-Dame-de-Bon-Secours chapel from the Harbor side in Montreal, Québec

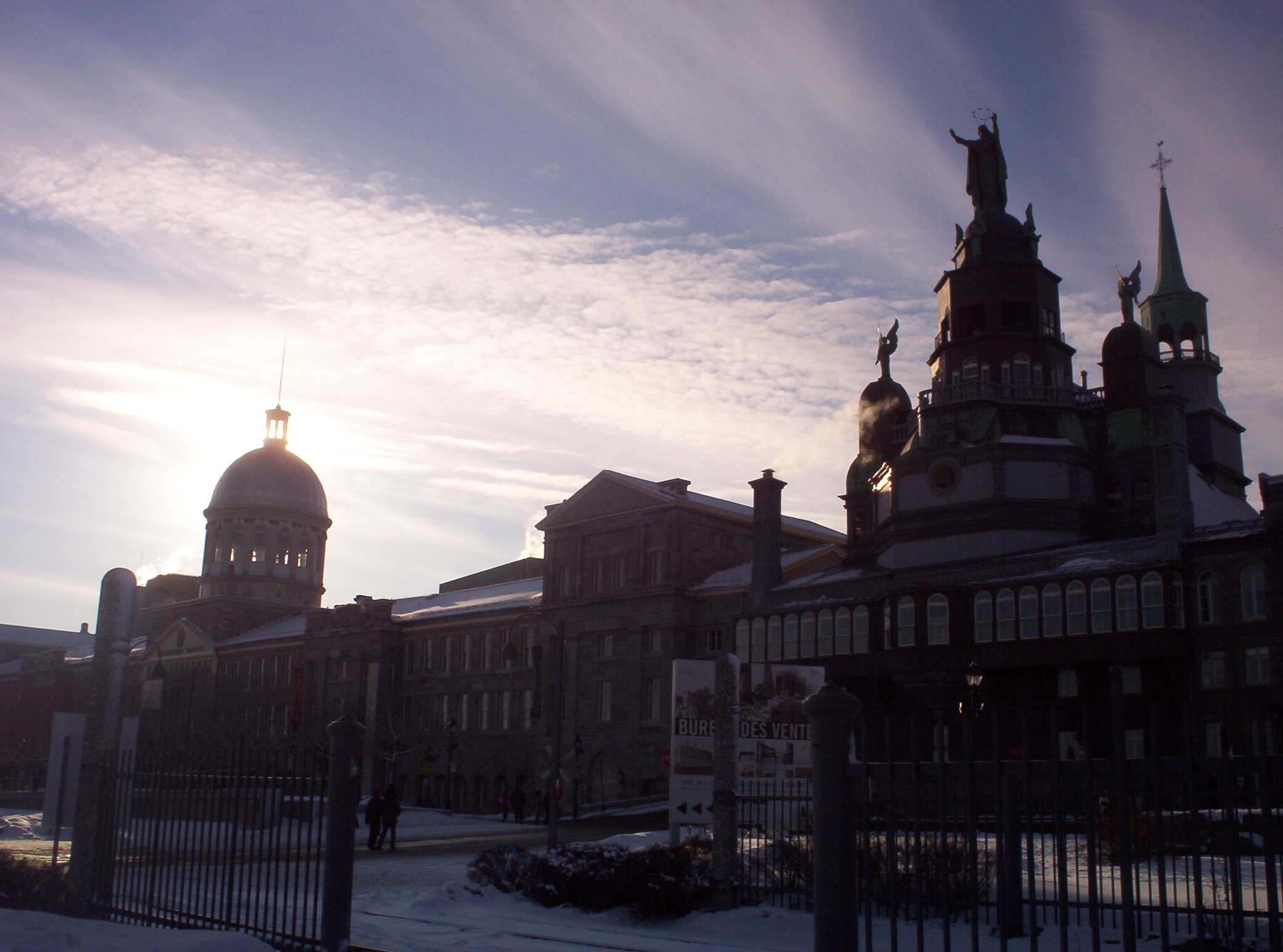
Exterior view of Notre-Dame-de-Bon-Secours chapel and the Bon secours Market

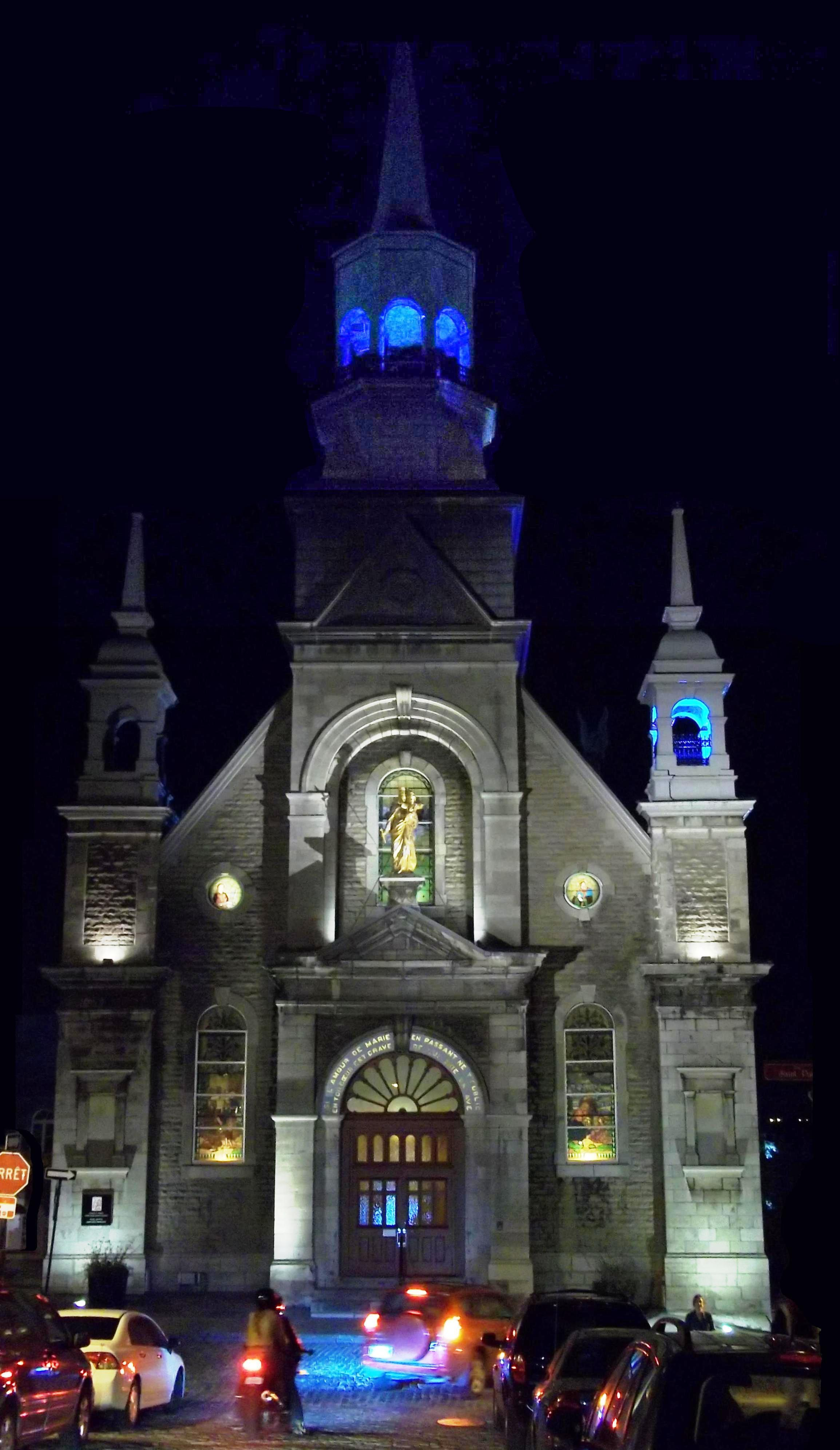
Exterior view of Notre-Dame-de-Bon-Secours chapel by night, Montreal, Quebec

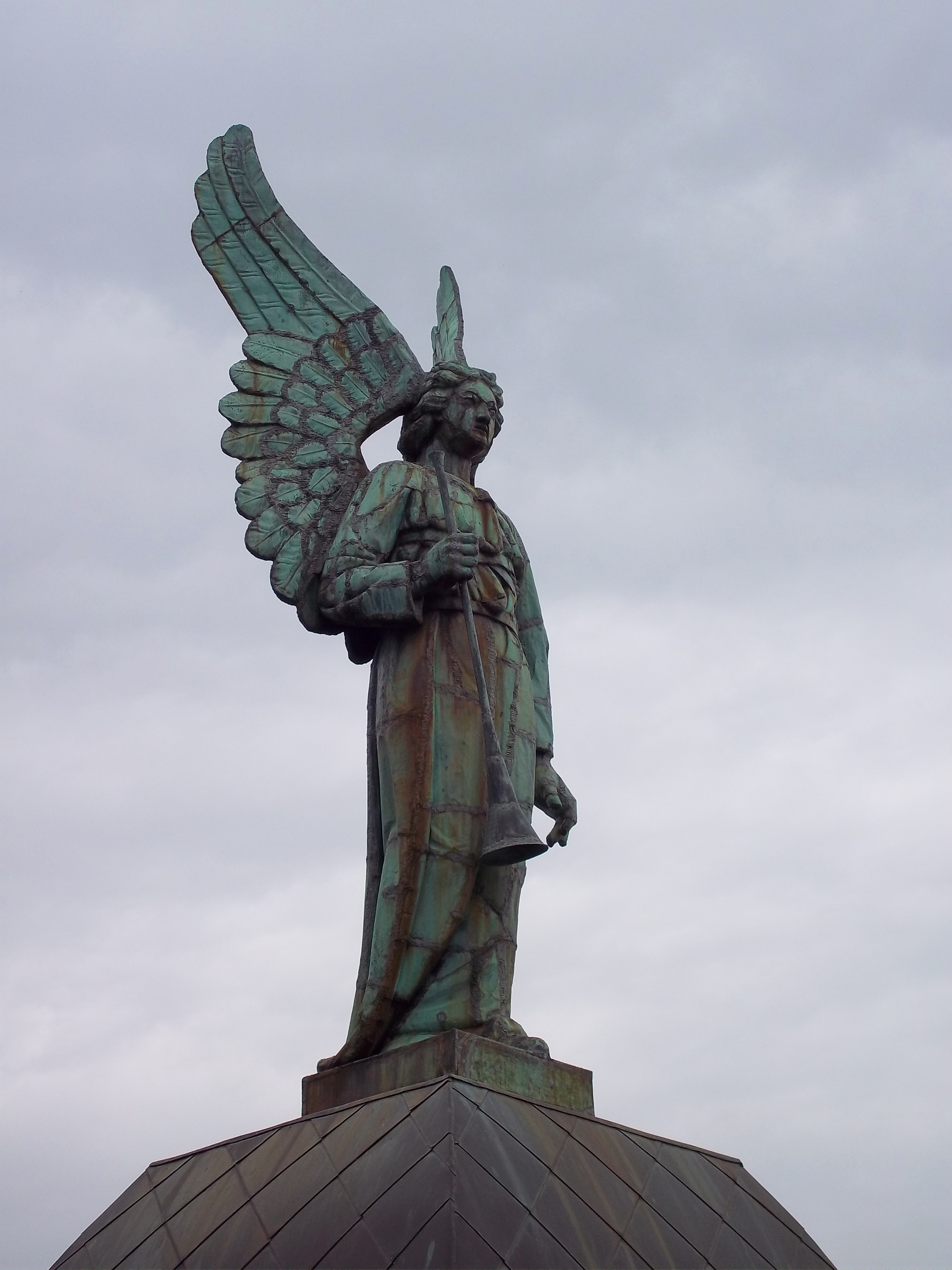
Angel, Notre-Dame-de-Bon-Secours Chapel, Montreal

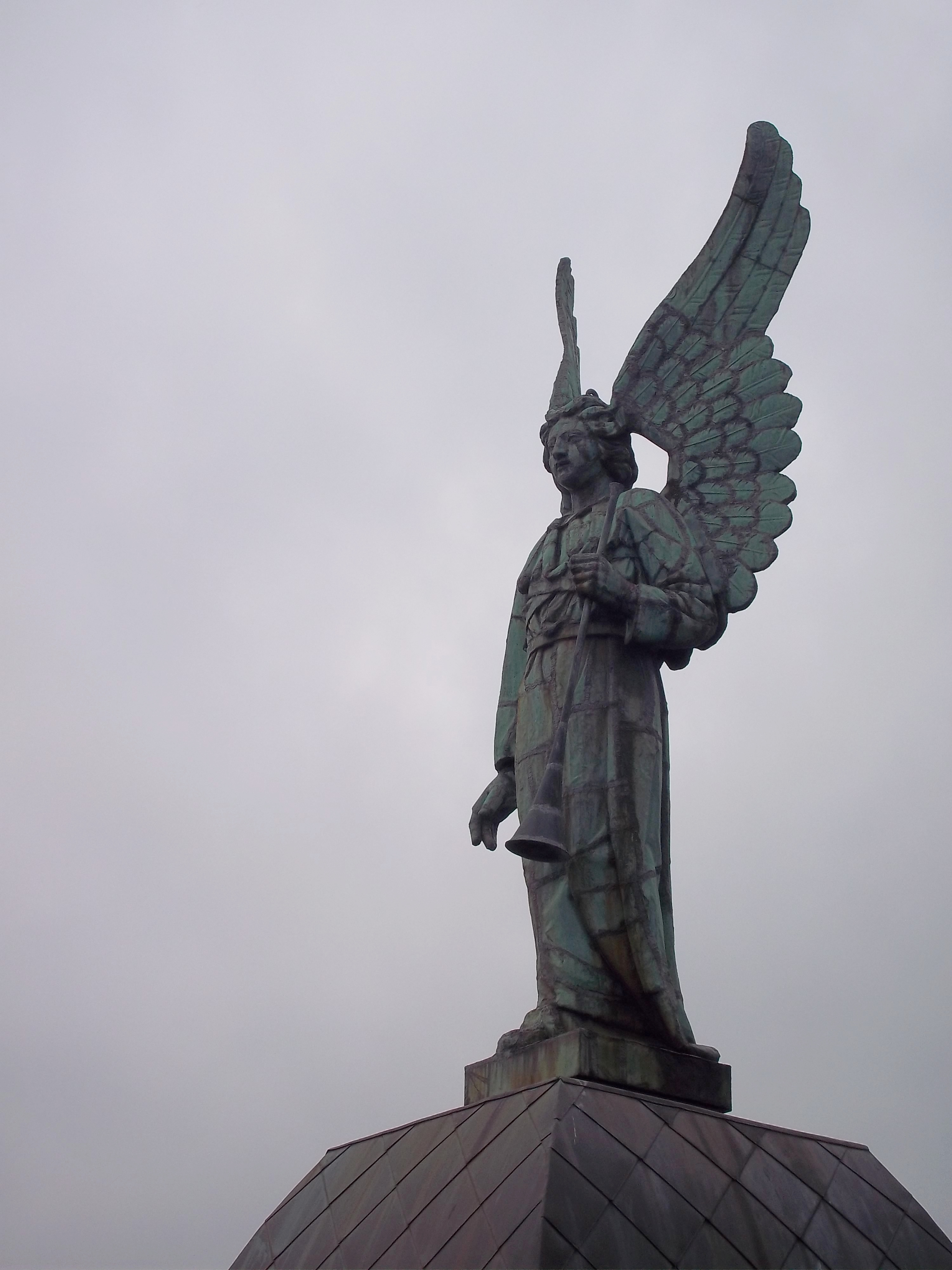
Angel, Notre-Dame-de-Bon-Secours Chapel, Montreal

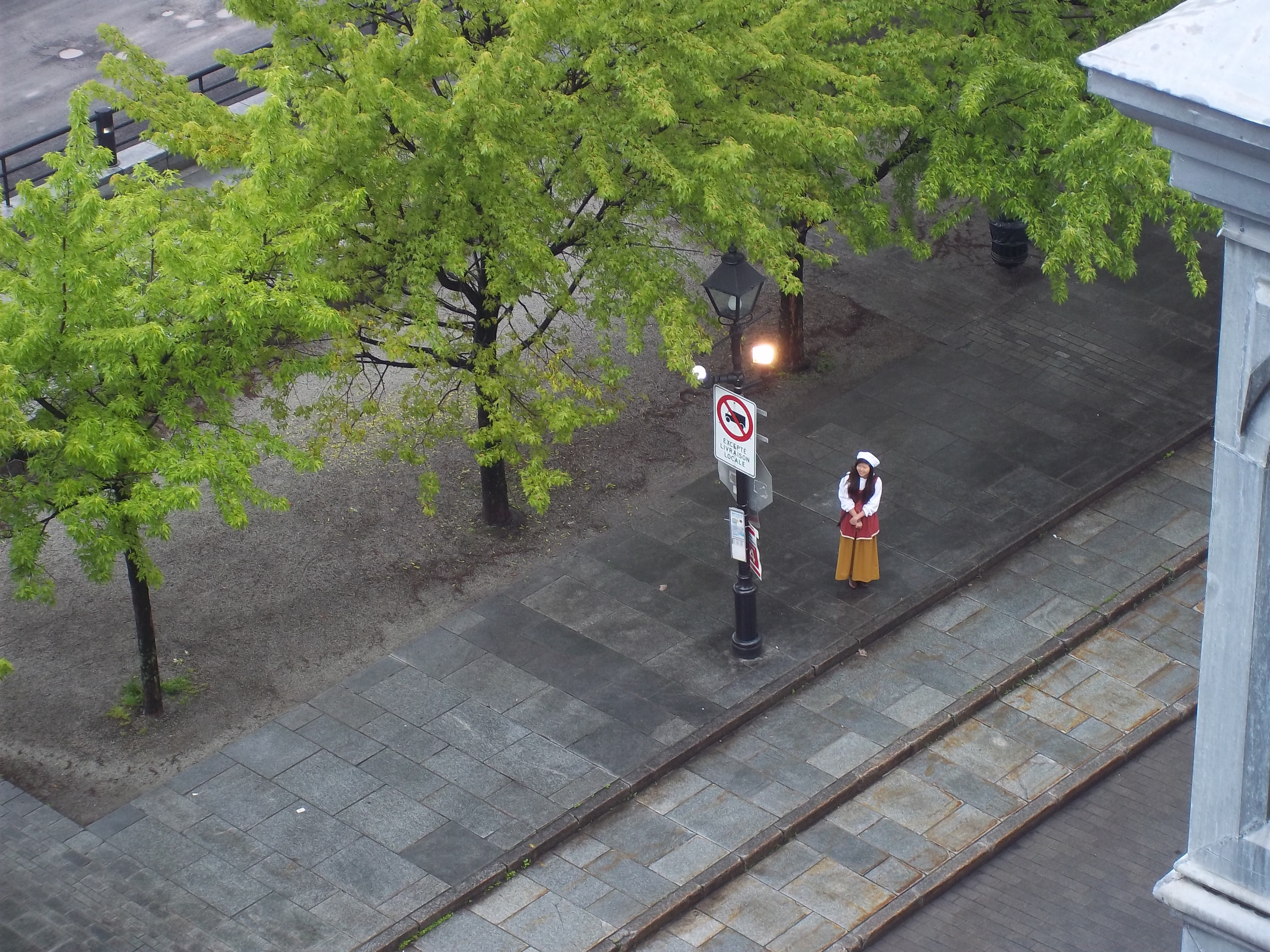
A guide as seen from the tower of Notre-Dame-de-Bon-Secours Chapel, Montreal

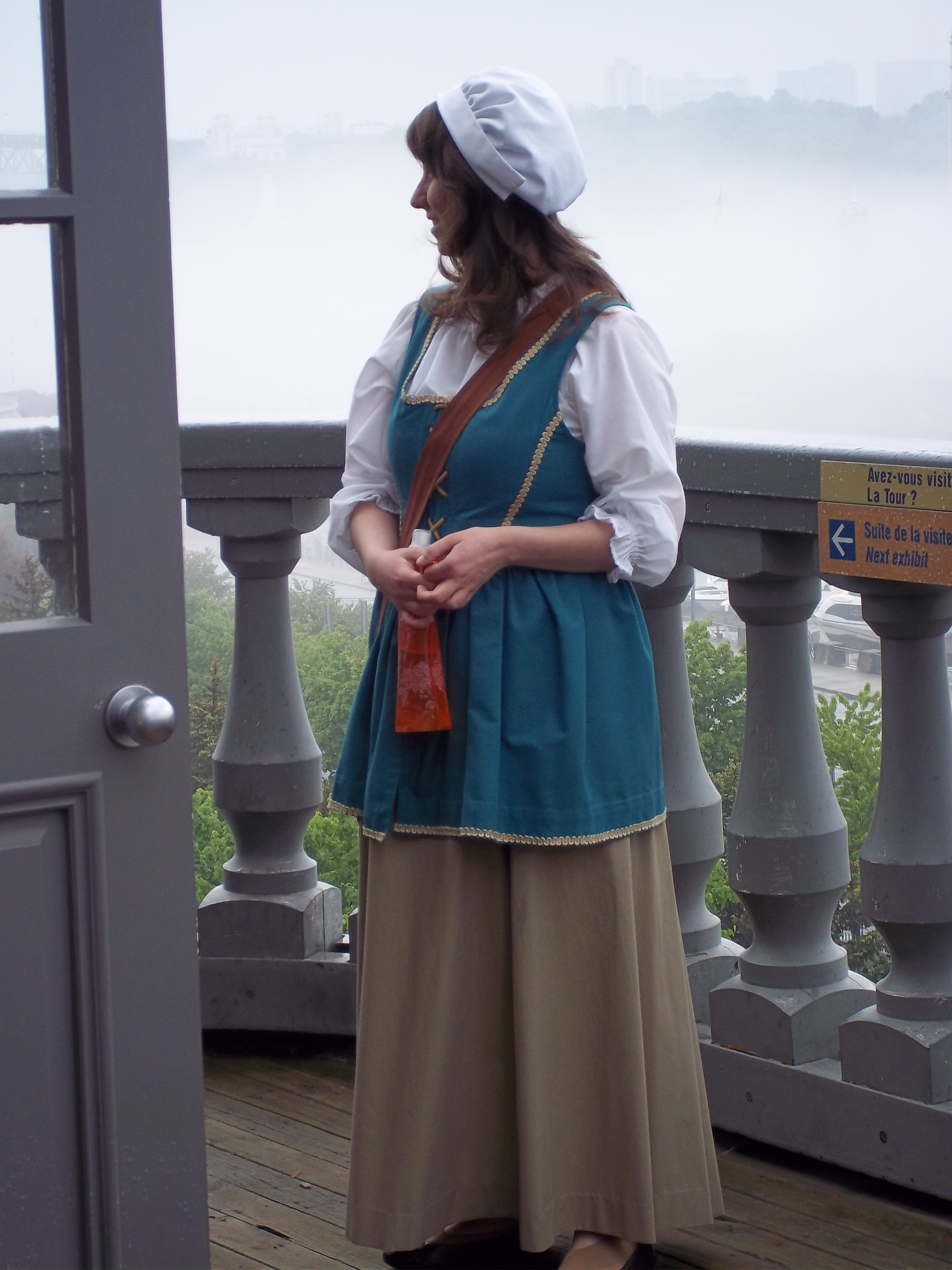
A guide at the top of the tower of Notre-Dame-de-Bon-Secours Chapel, Montreal

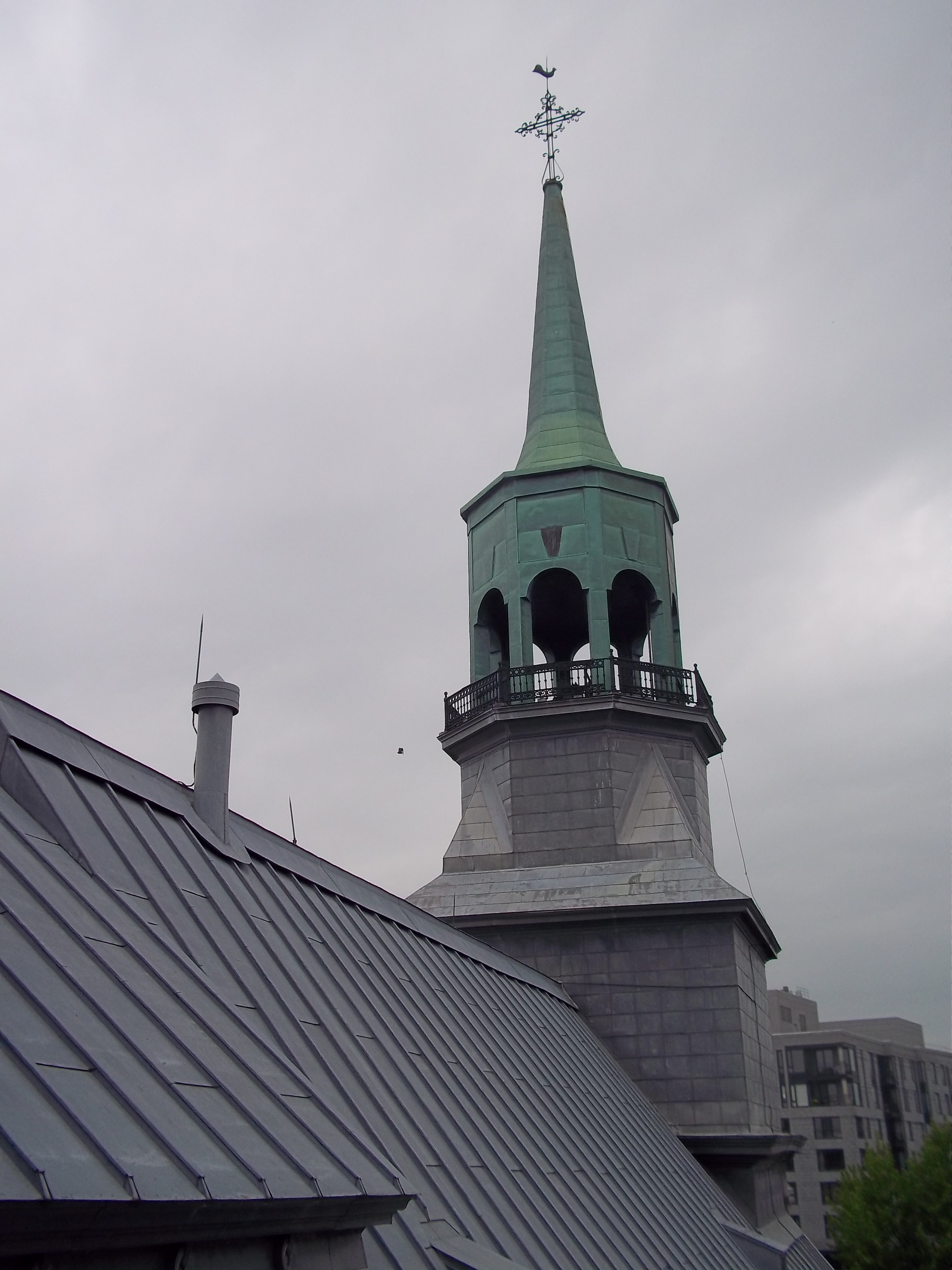
Roof of Notre-Dame-de-Bon-Secours Chapel, Montreal

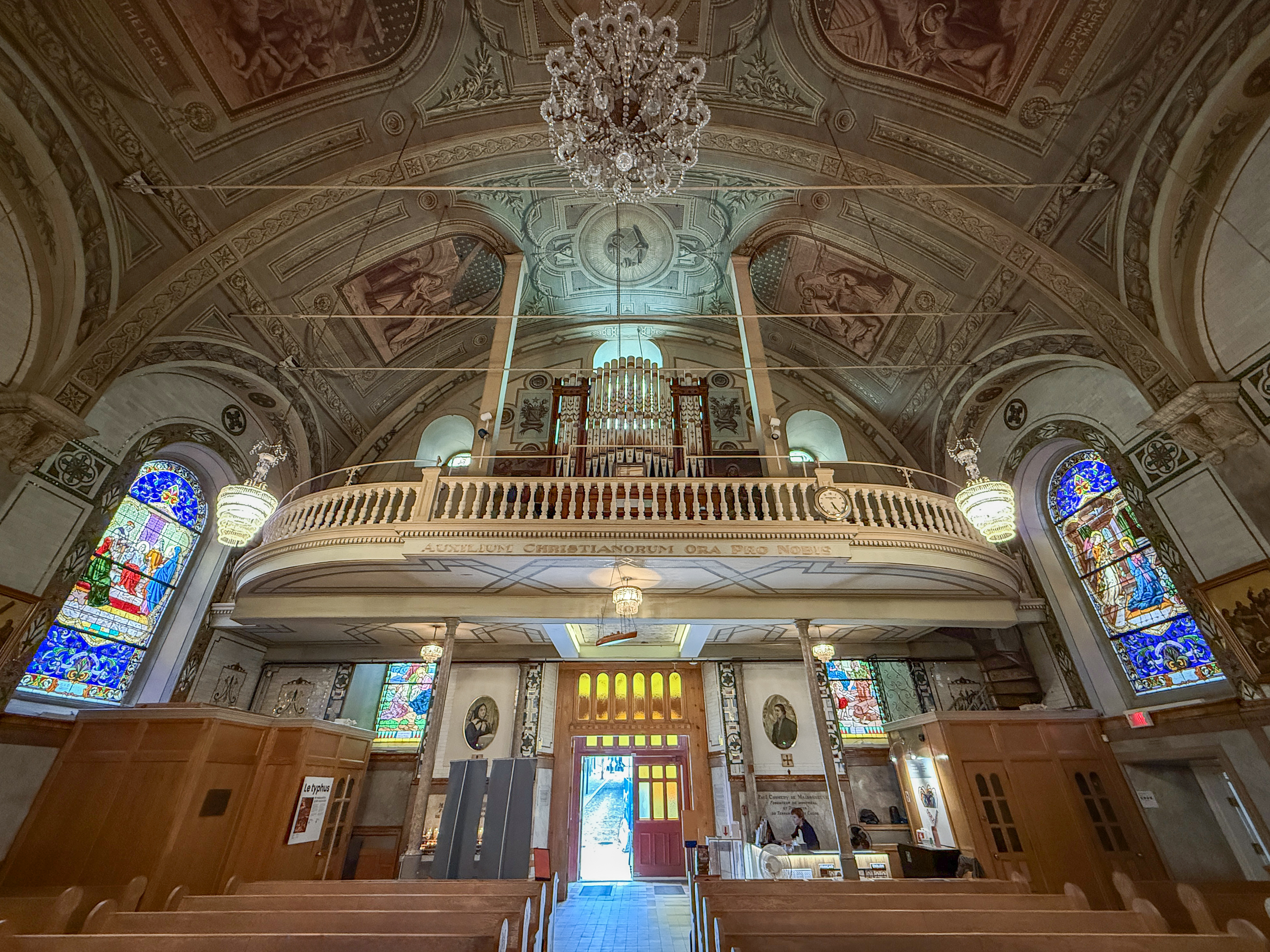
Interior view of Notre-Dame-de-Bon-Secours Chapel

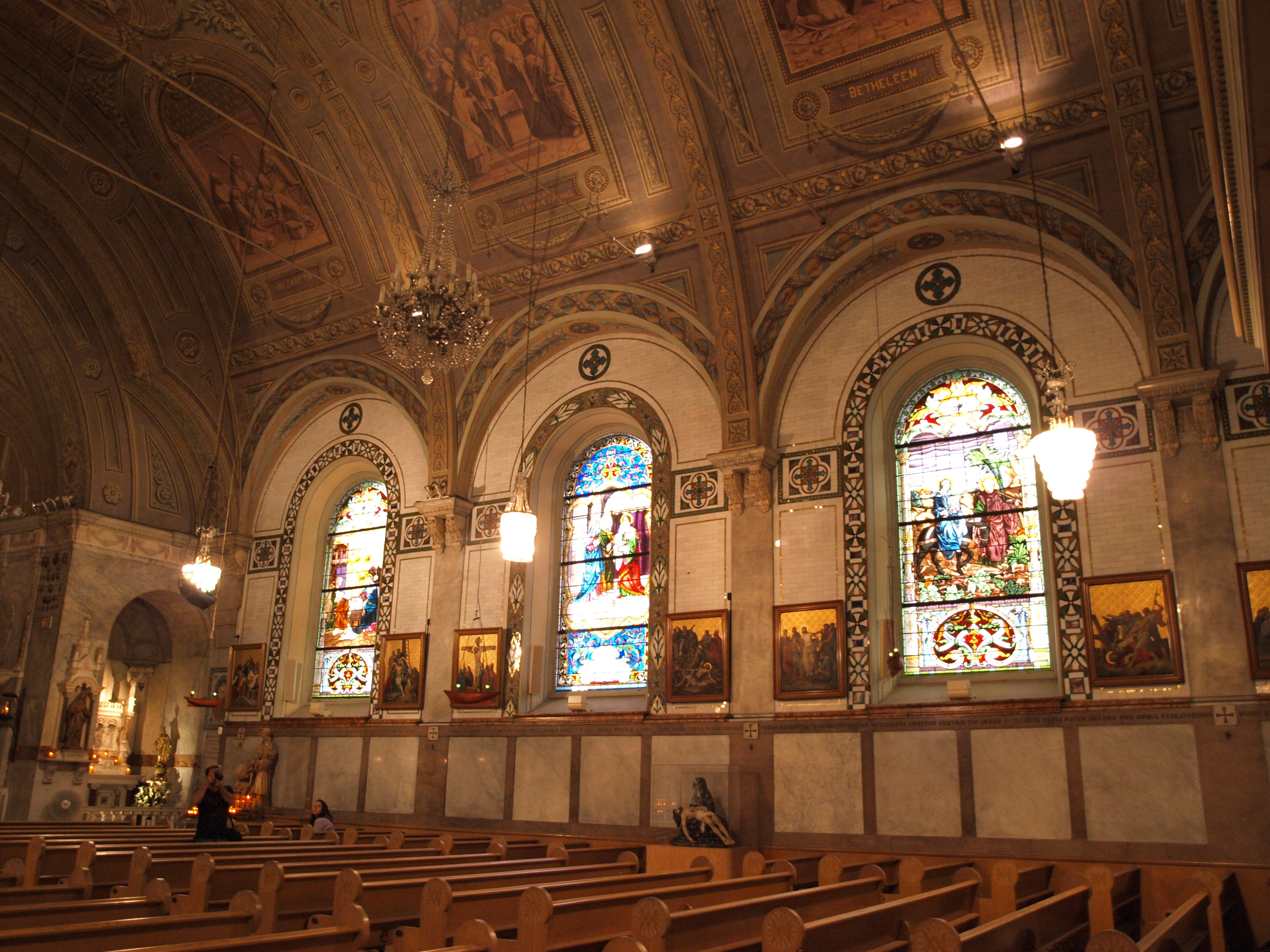
Interior view of Notre-Dame-de-Bon-Secours Chapel
