= Primordial Soup (studio) =

American creative and film production company

- Founded: 2025
- Founder: Darren Aronofsky
- Headquarters: New York, New York

Primordial Soup is a creative studio founded by filmmaker Darren Aronofsky to use generative AI in filmmaking.

== Overview ==
In May 2025, Primordial Soup was announced during the Google I/O conference, as part of a partnership with Google DeepMind to use of generative AI in storytelling. As part of the partnership, Primordial Soup will work with DeepMind to refine the technology company's generative AI video models, including Veo.

Primordial Soup's first announced project was Ancestra, a short film by director Eliza McNitt, which combined live-action performance with AI-generated visuals. The film premiered at the Tribeca Festival on June 13, 2025.

In July 2026, Primordial Soup disclosed plans to raise $15 million in an SEC filing to support its continued development and AI-related projects.
