= Stewart Levin =

American musician and composer

Stewart Levin is an American musician and composer who has composed music for television shows, including The Wonder Years, Picket Fences, The Practice and thirtysomething. He won an ASCAP Film and Television Music Award for his work on The Wonder Years and Emmy Award nominations for his work on Picket Fences and thirtysomething.
