= The Hole in the Fence =

- Theatrical release poster
- Spanish: El hoyo en la cerca
- Directed by: Joaquín del Paso
- Written by: Lucy Pawlak; Joaquin del Paso
- Produced by: Joaquín del Paso; Fernanda de la Peza
- Starring: Valeria Lamm; Lucciano Kurti; Yubáh Ortega; Erick Walker
- Cinematography: Alfonso Herrera Salcedo
- Edited by: Paloma López
- Music by: Kyle Dixon; Michael Stein
- Production companies: Amondo Films; Cárcava Cine
- Release dates: September 3, 2021 (Venice); June 9, 2022 (Mexico)
- Running time: 100 minutes
- Countries: Mexico; Poland
- Language: Spanish

The Hole in the Fence (Spanish: El hoyo en la cerca) is a 2021 thriller drama film directed by Joaquin del Paso and written by del Paso and Lucy Pawlak. Starring Valeria Lamm, Lucciano Kurti, Yubáh Ortega & Erick Walker. The film was named on the shortlist for Mexican's entry for the Academy Award for Best International Feature Film at the 95th Academy Awards, but it was not selected.

== Synopsis ==
Every year at Centro Escolar Los Pinos, a renowned religious private school for boys, sends “the children of the Mexican elite” to a summer camp in the countryside. Under the watchful eye of their teachers and priests, the boys are strengthened physically, morally and in their faith. But then they discover a hole in the fence surrounding the camp.

== Cast ==
The actors participating in this film are:

- Valeria Lamm as Jordi de la Torre
- Lucciano Kurti as Joaquín
- Jacek Poniedzialek as Professor Sztuhr
- Yubáh Ortega Iker Fernández as Eduardo
- Santiago Barajas Hamue as Diego
- Eric David Walker as Diego Peña
- Enrique Lascurain as Professor Monteros
- Diego Lozano as Josue
- Carlos Morett as "The Rat"
- Shota Yamada as Shota
- Raul Vasconcelos as Edwin
- Giovanni Conconi as Fito Salinas
- Pedro Nájera Contreras as Lolo
- José Alfredo Nájera Nuevo as Alfredo Juan
- Adolfo Osorio as "El Lunes"
- Bárbara Hernández as Selena
- Gabriel Fritsch as Chi Chi
- Takahiro Murokawa as Professor Tanaka
- Marcela Rendon as Josue's mom
- Raúl Nájera as Gardener 2
- Carlos Morett Joaquin Mcarthy as "The Fetus"
- Juan Pablo Ferreiro Soria as "The Ricky"
- Rafael Ayala as "The Güero"
- Charles Oppenheim as Professor Barquette
- Jerónimo Bahamón González as Alfredito
- Emilio Rojas Monico as Alfonso Juan
- Patrick Mcarthy as Chicharito
- Eduardo Nájera Contreras as Dante
- Héctor Kuri Hernandez Romo as Mario

== Release ==
The film had its international premiere on September 3, 2021, at the 78th Venice International Film Festival. On October 4, 2021, it screened at the 58th Antalya Golden Orange Film Festival, it also screened at the BFI London Film Festival in the middle of the same month. It was commercially released on June 9, 2022, in Mexican theaters.

== Reception ==
=== Critical reception ===
On the review aggregator website Rotten Tomatoes, 90% of 10 critics' reviews are positive, with an average rating of 6.8/10.

David Katz from Cineuropa wrote: "This is an eminently well-made, well-designed and watchable piece of work, with fine, improvisational performances from young adolescents acting for the first time. It may be an odd claim to make in light of the Michel Franco comparison, but The Hole in the Fence still undoes itself slightly because of its sensationalist tone and the vaguer aspects of its harsh critique of religious education. When a film is both political and incoherent, the former element loses its sting."

=== Accolades ===
Year	Award	Category	Recipient	Result	Ref.
2021	Cairo International Film Festival	Best Film	The Hole in the Fence	Won	
2021	Hollywood Music In Media Awards	Best Original Score - Independent Film (Foreign Language)	Kyle Dixon & Michael Stein	Nominated	
2021	Huelva Festival - Ibero-American Cinema	Best Film	The Hole in the Fence	Nominated	
2021	Antalya Golden Orange Film Festival	Best International Film	The Hole in the Fence	Nominated	
2021	Morelia International Film Festival	Best Film	The Hole in the Fence	Nominated	
2021	Morelia International Film Festival	Best Director	Joaquin del Paso	Nominated	
2021	Venice Film Festival	Queer Lion	Joaquin del Paso	Nominated	
2021	Venice Film Festival	Best Film	The Hole in the Fence	Nominated	
2021	Warsaw International Film Festival	Competition 1-2 Award - Best Film	The Hole in the Fence	Nominated	
2022	FICUNAM UNAM International Film Festival	Best Mexican Film	The Hole in the Fence	Nominated	
2022	Ariel Award	Best Screenplay Written Directly for the Screen	Joaquin del Paso & Lucy Pawlak	Nominated	
2022	Ariel Award	Best Sound	Guido Berenblum, Santiago Arroyo, Jaime Baksht & Michelle Couttolenc	Nominated	
2022	Ariel Award	Best Original Score	Kyle Dixon & Michael Stein	Nominated	
2022	Ariel Award	Best Costume Design	Ursula Schneider	Nominated	
2022	Ariel Award	Best Editing	Paloma López	Nominated	
2023	Canacine Awards, MX	Best Newcomer - Male	Yubah Ortega	Nominated	
