= Saint-Paul Street (Montreal) =

Street in Old Montreal, Canada

Coordinates: 45°30′19″N 73°33′14″W

Saint Paul Street
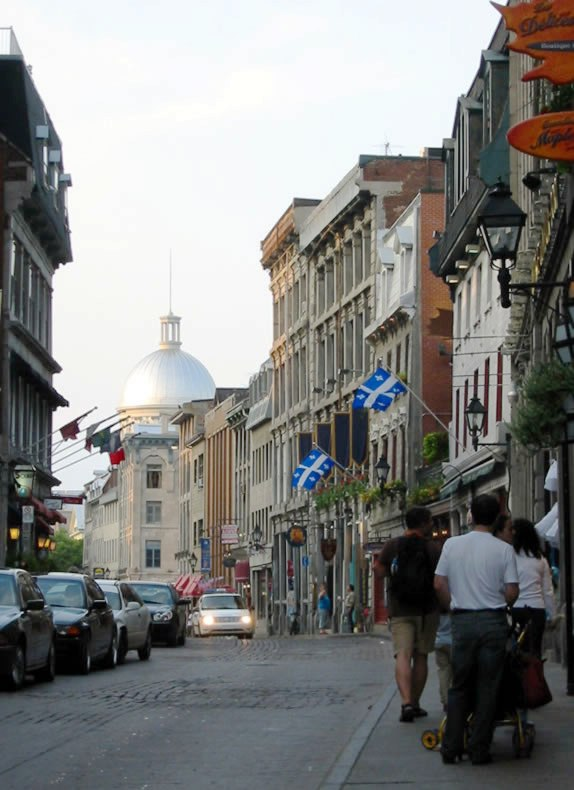
- Saint Paul Street in Old Montreal
- Interactive map of Saint Paul Street
- Native name: Rue Saint-Paul (French)
- Length: 2 km (1.2 mi)
- Location: Montreal
- West end: Montfort Street
- Major junctions: At-grade section of A-10 Boulevard Robert-Bourassa
- East end: Berri Street

Construction
- Inauguration: 1673

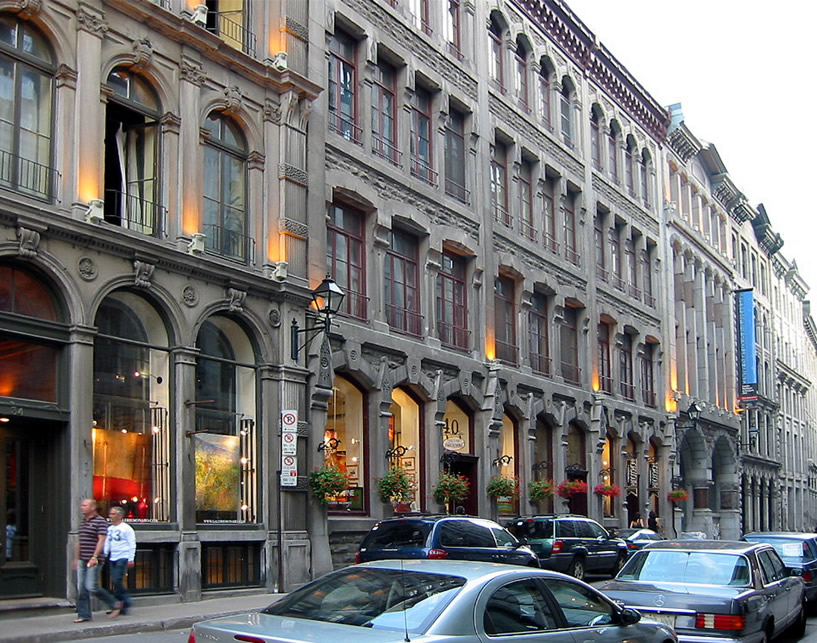
Rue Saint-Paul

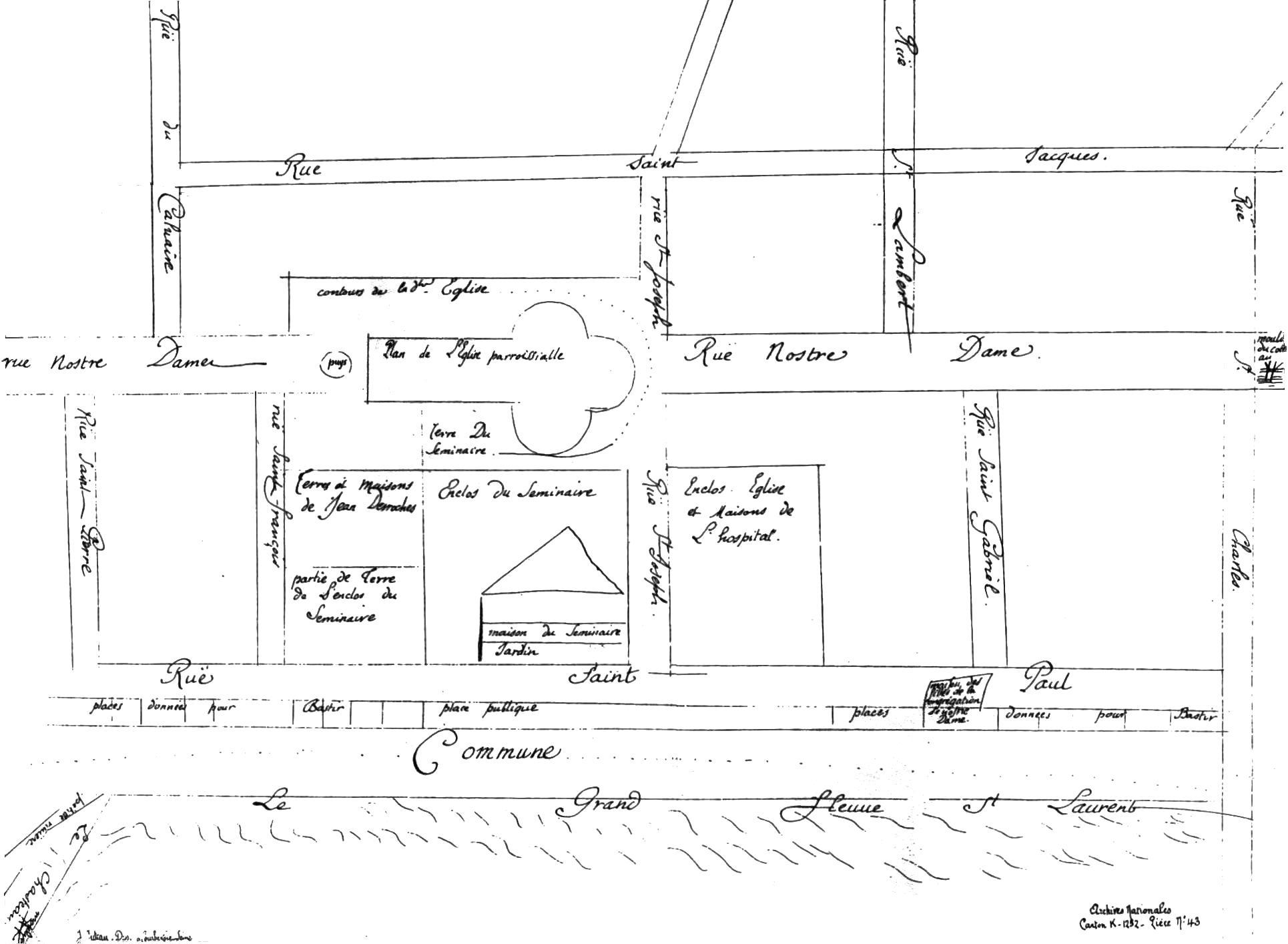
Montreal map drawn by François Dollier de Casson in 1672

Saint Paul Street (officially in French: Rue Saint-Paul) is a street in the Old Montreal historic area of Montreal, Quebec.

The street was laid out by François Dollier de Casson, along the route of a path that had bordered a former fort. Saint Paul is Montreal's oldest street and for many years served as its main thoroughfare. Paved in 1672, it was named after Paul de Chomedey de Maisonneuve, founder of Montreal, who built a home for himself on it in 1650.

The street is home to such landmarks as the Bonsecours Market and Notre-Dame-de-Bon-Secours Chapel. Much of Saint Paul is still paved with cobblestones. Plans to pedestrianize the street in 2008 were dropped by the City of Montreal after complaints from merchants.
