= Eliza McNitt =

American writer and director

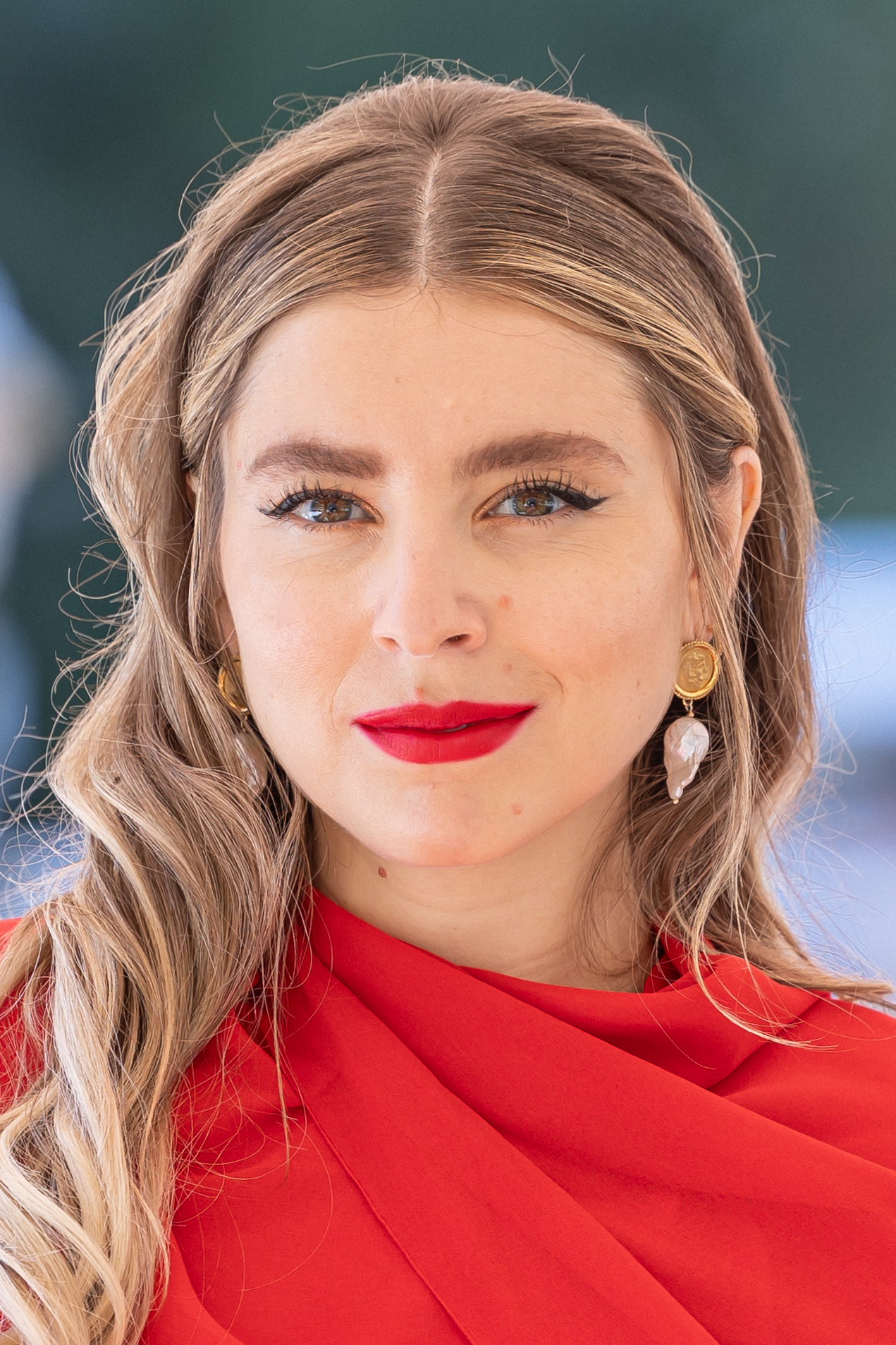
- McNitt at the 2024 Venice Film Festival
- Occupations: Writer, director
- Years active: 2013-present

Eliza McNitt is an American writer and director who specializes in virtual reality.

== Career ==
McNitt produced her first documentary, Requiem for the Honeybee, in high school. McNitt later released two short films Without Fire, a survival story, and Artemis Falls, which follows an astronaut on her journey into space.

McNitt's first VR production, Fistful of Stars, focused on the explorations of The Hubble Telescope. 2018's Spheres, produced by Darren Aronofsky, debuted at the Telluride Film Festival and was later acquired in a seven-figure deal. Its second chapter was a finalist in the "“Innovation in Interactive Media" category at the 2018 Emmy Awards and won the grand prize in the VR category at the 2018 Venice Film Festival.

In May 2025, McNitt's short film project Ancestra, produced by Primordial Soup was announced to premiere at Tribeca Film Festival on June 13, 2025.

== Awards and nominations ==
Year	Nominated work	Award	Category	Result	Ref.
2014	Without Fire	Santa Fe Film Festival Director's Choice Award	Drama	Winner	
2014	Without Fire	Arizona International Film Festival Prize	Best Dramatic Short Film	Winner	
2018	SPHERES	Emmy Awards	Finalist	Finalist	
2018	SPHERES	Venice Film Festival Grand Prize	VR	Winner	
