= Spheres: Songs of Spacetime =

Virtual reality experience

- Directed by: Eliza McNitt
- Written by: Eliza McNitt
- Produced by: Darren Aronofsky; Joel Newton
- Starring: Millie Bobby Brown; Jessica Chastain; Patti Smith
- Release date: 17 January 2018
- Running time: 45 mins
- Country: United States
- Language: English

Spheres: Songs of Spacetime is a three-part virtual reality (VR) experience created by Eliza McNitt and produced by Darren Aronofsky that takes the viewer on a journey through space and the sounds that can be heard there. It was notably the first known VR product to secure a seven figure deal coming out of a film festival, namely Sundance, provoking significant media interest in the state of the VR film industry.

== Cast ==
- Millie Bobby Brown as Narrator ("Chorus of the Cosmos" segment)
- Jessica Chastain as Narrator ("Songs of Spacetime" segment)
- Patti Smith as Narrator ("Pale Blue Dog" segment)
