= I Remember =

I Remember may refer to:

== Music ==
=== Albums ===
- I Remember (AlunaGeorge album), 2016
- I Remember (Meli'sa Morgan album), 2005
- I Remember, a 2012 album by Shin
- I Remember, a 1991 album by Dianne Reeves

=== Songs ===
- "I Remember" (The Badloves song), from Get On Board
- "I Remember" (Bang Yong-guk and Yang Yo-seob song)
- "I Remember" (Keyshia Cole song), from Just like You
- "I Remember" (deadmau5 and Kaskade song), from Random Album Title and Strobelite Seduction
- "I Remember", by A Day to Remember from Common Courtesy
- "I Remember", by Betty Who from Betty
- "I Remember", by Coolio from It Takes a Thief
- "I Remember", by Eddie Cochran, B-side from the single "Teenage Heaven"
- "I Remember", by the Happy Fits from Lovesick
- "I Remember", by Kelly Rowland from Talk a Good Game
- "I Remember", by Maurice Williams & The Zodiacs from Stay with Maurice Williams & The Zodiacs
- "I Remember", by Stabbing Westward from Stabbing Westward
- "I Remember", by The Urge from Receiving the Gift of Flavor
- "I Remember", by Stephen Sondheim from the musical Evening Primrose
- "I Remember", a single by Eminem

== Other uses ==
- Je me souviens, the motto of Quebec, Canada, which translates to "I remember"
- I Remember (book), a 1970 memoir by Joe Brainard

== See also ==
- I Remember Better When I Paint, a documentary film
- "I Remember Elvis Presley (The King Is Dead)", a song by Danny Mirror
- I Remember You (disambiguation)
- "I Will Remember", a song by Toto
- I Will Remember You (disambiguation)
- "I'll Remember", a song by Madonna
- "In the Still of the Nite (I'll Remember)", a version of the song, "In the Still of the Nite" by The Five Satins, recorded by Boyz II Men
- Remember (disambiguation)
