= What Are You Lookin' At? =

Studio album by Rockell
- Released: April 28, 1998
- Studio: The Polygon
- Genre: Freestyle, dance, house
- Length: 44:35
- Label: Robbins Entertainment
- Producer: Adam Marano, Joe Tucci, Billy Brown, Ewart A. Wilson, Jr.

Rockell studio album chronology
What Are You Lookin' At? (1998)	Instant Pleasure (2000)

Singles from What Are You Lookin' At?
- 1. "I Fell In Love" Released: September 27, 1996; 2. "In a Dream" Released: May 20, 1997; 3. "Can't We Try" Released: May 15, 1998; 4. "When I'm Gone" Released: January 8, 1999

Professional ratings
Review scores
Source	Rating
AllMusic	4/5 stars

What Are You Lookin' At? is the debut album by Rockell, released on Robbins Entertainment on April 28, 1998. It includes the hit singles "I Fell in Love", "In a Dream", "Can't We Try" (featuring Collage) and "When I'm Gone".

== Track listing ==
No.	Title	Length
1.	"When I'm Gone"	4:35
2.	"Can't We Try" (featuring Collage)	4:17
3.	"Runaway with Me"	3:21
4.	"In a Dream" (Original Mix)	4:00
5.	"Show Me the Way"	4:00
6.	"Love Won't Let Me Wait"	3:30
7.	"Take You Higher"	3:41
8.	"I Fell in Love"	4:32
9.	"Dream Boy-Dream Girl" (featuring Collage)	3:15
10.	"In a Dream" (1:00 AM Mix)	4:24
11.	"I'll Be There"	4:00

== Chart positions ==
Album - Billboard (North America)

Year	Chart	Position
1998	Heatseekers	30
