= I Remember You =

I Remember You may refer to:

== Music ==
=== Albums ===
- I Remember You..., a 1980 album by Karin Krog, Warne Marsh and Red Mitchell
- I Remember You (Brian McKnight album), 1995
- I Remember You (Jo Stafford album), 2002
- I Remember You (Templeton Thompson album), 2003
- I Remember You (Hank Jones album), 1977
- I Remember You (John Hicks album), 2009

=== Songs ===
- "I Remember You" (1941 song), covered by Frank Ifield (1962) and Björk (1993)
- "I Remember You" (Denine song)
- "I Remember You" (Skid Row song), 1989
- "I Remember You" (Yui song), 2006
- "I Remember You", by Bobby Vinton from Bobby Vinton Sings the Big Ones
- "I Remember You", by Kris Allen from Letting You In
- "I Remember You", by the Pretenders from Get Close
- "I Remember You", by Ramones from Leave Home
- "I Remember You", by Roxette from Joyride
- "I Remember You", by Tom Chaplin from The Wave
- "I Remember U", a song by Cartoon and Jéja featuring Jüri Pootsmann

== Other uses ==
- "I Remember You" (Adventure Time)
- I Remember You (2015 film), an American film
- I Remember You (2017 film), an Icelandic film
- I Remember You, a 2015 South Korean television series

== See also ==
- I Will Remember You (disambiguation)
