= Russ Castella =

American record producer

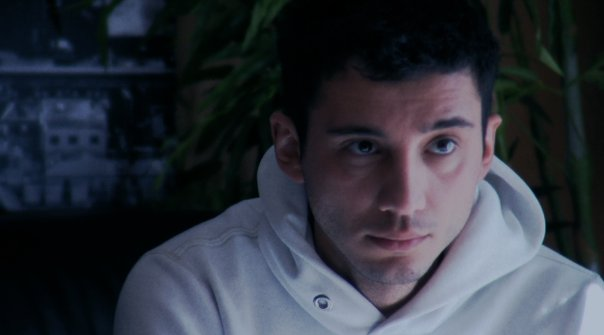

Background information
- Born: Russ Castella; November 15, 1983 (age 42)
- Origin: Baku, Azerbaijan
- Genres: Hip hop, R&B, Pop
- Occupations: Producer, Remixer
- Instruments: Keyboard, Sampler drums, percussion
- Years active: 2004–present
- Label: Bliss Entertainment

Russ Castella (born November 15, 1983) is an American record producer. He has found success in many genres of music, particularly dance, pop, and R&B. He has his own record label, Bliss Entertainment.

He has produced and remixed for a variety of artists including Lil Wayne, Irene Nelson, Ciara, Mariah Carey, The-Dream, Britney Spears, O'so Krispie, Rihanna, Keri Hilson, The Black Eyed Peas, Rockell, Danielle Bollinger, Mike Rizzo, Allie, Elissa (Canadian singer), and many more. His remixes can be recognized by the intro where he says the artist's name following "you know I had to do this, right? It's the Russ Castella remix." Russ has also scored a full length soundtrack for the movie titled Swamp Zombies in 2006 which starred porn star Jasmin St. Claire.

== Past Projects ==
Russ Castella was heavily involved in managing a singing career of Irene Nelson. He has remixed her debut single "Sunrise" which is distributed by Universal Music Group. The remix features Lil Wayne.

Russ was also in the studio with the UPN reality TV star O'so Krispie for whom he is producing a full album titled, The Pink Album

A remix of Lil Wayne - Prom Queen has been leaked on March 13 which was produced by Russ Castella. It features a melodic ballad with just piano and strings titled as "Russ Castella Piano Version". A more radio friendly version of the remix has been sent out to US radio stations on March 13 which is titled "Russ Castella Remix." It consists of the same piano melody, heavy bass, and 808s drums.

== Current Projects ==
Russ Castella has retired from active music production and has transitioned to a new role as the founder of Castella Media Group, a digital marketing agency. The firm focuses on promoting music videos and brands across various social media platforms, including TikTok, YouTube, and Instagram.

== Production and Remix Credits ==
Drake

- "Forever" (Russ Castella Remix) [Ft. Lil Wayne, Eminem] (Kanye West Diss)

Irene Nelson

- "Sunrise" (Russ Castella Remix) [ft. Lil Wayne]

Lil Wayne

- "Prom Queen" (Russ Castella Piano Version) [Radio & Piano Versions]

The Black Eyed Peas

- "Boom Boom Pow"

Ciara featuring Justin Timberlake

- "Love Sex Magic" (Russ Castella Remix)

Britney Spears (Zomba)

- "Womanizer" (Russ Castella Remix)
- "Circus" (Russ Castella Remix)
- "Shattered Glass" (Russ Castella Remix) Remix samples Ciara's Like a Boy
- "Out from Under" (Russ Castella Lollipop Remix) Remix samples Lil Wayne's "Lollipop"

Keri Hilson (Universal)

- "Energy" (Russ Castella Remix)

O'so Krispie (Bliss Entertainment)

- "Slumber Party" (featuring King Official)

Rihanna (Def Jam Recordings)

- "SOS"

LL Cool J featuring Jennifer Lopez (Def Jam Recordings)

- "Control Myself"

Allie (Koch Records)

- "Living in a Whisper" (Russ Castella Remix)

Danielle Bollinger

- "You'll Always Have Me"

Rockell

- "L.O.V.E." (Russ Castella Remix)
