= Insidious: The Red Door (soundtrack) =

Insidious: The Red Door (Original Motion Picture Soundtrack)

Film score by Joseph Bishara
- Released: July 7, 2023
- Genre: Film score
- Length: 47:49
- Label: Madison Gate Records
- Producer: Joseph Bishara

Joseph Bishara chronology
| Lullaby (2022) | Insidious: The Red Door (2023) | The Cello (2023) |

Insidious: The Red Door (Original Motion Picture Soundtrack) is the film score to the 2023 film Insidious: The Red Door directed by Patrick Wilson, which is the fifth instalment in the Insidious franchise and sequel to Insidious: Chapter 2 (2013). The film is scored by recurring franchise composer Joseph Bishara and released through Madison Gate Records on July 7, 2023.

== Background ==
Recurring franchise composer Joseph Bishara was announced to score music for The Red Door in April 2023. The score was released through Madison Gate Records on July 7, 2023.

Though not included in the soundtrack, the film's closing credits feature a cover version of Shakespears Sister's 1992 song "Stay" performed by Ghost and Patrick Wilson.

== Reception ==
Josh Korngut of Dread Central considered the score to be "eerie". Owen Gleiberman of Variety and Frank Scheck of The Hollywood Reporter called the score "mystical" and "overwhelming". Andrew J. Salazar of DiscussingFilm wrote "another killer score from series composer Joseph Bishara". Karen Woodham of Blazing Minds wrote "Joseph Bishara's soundtrack certainly adds to the atmosphere of the movie, he's brought the soundtrack to all the Insidious movies so you know what you are getting when it comes to the tension of various scenes." Matt Donato of Paste wrote "Joseph Bishara’s score intensely spikes to elevate our heart rate".

== Track listing ==
| No. | Title | Length |
|---|---|---|
| 1. | "The Insidious Shine" | 3:05 |
| 2. | "Insidious The Red Door" | 2:12 |
| 3. | "Bond Collapsed" | 1:34 |
| 4. | "Wellness Check" | 0:57 |
| 5. | "Drawing Started" | 2:19 |
| 6. | "Door Memories" | 1:01 |
| 7. | "Further Lit" | 1:28 |
| 8. | "Vomit Boy" | 1:30 |
| 9. | "Further Calling" | 1:33 |
| 10. | "Closer To Something" | 1:36 |
| 11. | "Through Window Smashed" | 1:08 |
| 12. | "Farewell Traveler" | 2:42 |
| 13. | "Archives Tell" | 1:18 |
| 14. | "Hammer Memories" | 2:29 |
| 15. | "Answers Past" | 0:53 |
| 16. | "Entity Photographs" | 0:51 |
| 17. | "Hammer Painting" | 3:48 |
| 18. | "Taken Behind Eyes" | 1:47 |
| 19. | "Further Taken" | 2:47 |
| 20. | "Red Door Opened" | 3:14 |
| 21. | "Need To Remember" | 0:47 |
| 22. | "Further Affirmation" | 2:25 |
| 23. | "I Know You" | 3:04 |
| 24. | "Void Figure 7 Ch5" | 3:21 |
| Total length: | | 47:49 |

== Additional music ==
- "Roll with the Changes" – REO Speedwagon
- "Tip Toe Thru' the Tulips with Me" – Tiny Tim
- "Calling My Children Home" – Traditional
- "Dangerous Behavior" – Eric V. Hachikian
- "L.O.V.E." – Robin Loxley and Slow Wave
- "Arab Money" – X.Orbit feat. Toon
- "Fill Your Heart" – Tiny Tim
- "Astra Travel" – Alan Hawkshaw

== Accolades ==
| Award | Date of Ceremony | Category | Recipient(s) | Result | Ref |
|---|---|---|---|---|---|
| Hollywood Music in Media Awards | November 15, 2023 | Original Score — Horror Film | Joseph Bishara | Nominated | |
