= Alyona Torganova =

Russian singer (born 1980)

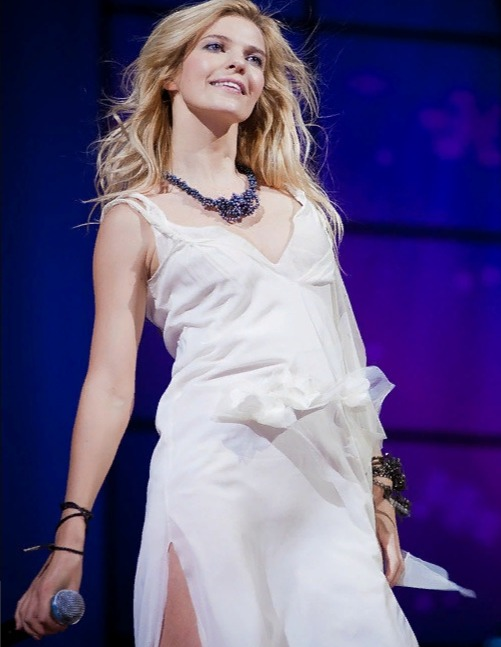
- Torganova in 2011

Background information
- Born: Alyona Vladimirovna Torganova; 14 September 1980 (age 45); Kurchatov, East Kazakhstan Region, Kazakh Soviet Socialist Republic, USSR
- Genres: Pop, dance, Soft rock
- Occupations: singer, choreographer, dancer
- Years active: 2002–present
- Label: NTMG
- Website: alenatorganova.ru

Alyona Vladimirovna Torganova (Russian: Алёна Владимировна Торганова; born 14 May 1980) is a singer, ex-member of Russian girls band Reflex (2002–2016).

== Biography ==
Alyona was born on 14 May 1980 in Kurchatov, Kazakhstan SSR. She has a younger brother and sister.

She graduated from Moscow State Art and Cultural University, a specialist in show business and management.

In parallel with her studies she was engaged in choreography, she danced in Moscow clubs.

== Career ==
Choreographer, backing vocalist and dancer of the Reflex since 2002. In 2013, the blades of scenic winds cut Torganova phalanx of the finger. In the Moscow clinic Alyona immediately sewn a severed finger.

On 25 March 2016 announced the departure of the group.

Alyona repeatedly entered the hundred of the most beautiful girls in Russia according to MAXIM.

== Discography ==
=== Albums ===
with Reflex

- 2002 — Go Crazy
- 2002 — I Will Always Wait for You
- 2002 — This is Love
- 2003 — Non Stop
- 2005 — Lyrics. I Love.
- 2005 — Pulse
- 2006 — Harem (Lounge feat. Chillout remixes)
- 2008 — Blondes 126
- 2014 — Memories
- 2015 — Adult Girls
