= Two Hands =

Two Hands may refer to:

- Two Hands (1999 film), a 1999 Australian crime film starring Heath Ledger
- Two Hands: The Leon Fleisher Story, a 2006 short documentary about a pianist
- "Two Hands" (song), by Jars of Clay
- "Two Hands", a song by King Crimson on the album Beat
- Two Hands winery in the Barossa Valley, South Australia
- Two Hands (Turbowolf album), a 2015 album by Turbowolf
- Two Hands (Big Thief album), a 2019 album by Big Thief
- "Two Hands", a 2025 single by GT_Ofice

== See also ==
- 2 Hands, a 2024 song by Tate McRae
- Hand
