= Chapter One =

Chapter One usually refers to a first chapter in a book.

Chapter One, Chapter 1 or Chapter I may also refer to:

== Music ==
- Chapter One (Collage album) (1994)
- Chapter One (Ella Henderson album) (2014)
- Chapter One (FSOM album), 1995
- Chapter One (John Sykes album) (1998)
- Chapter One (Level 10 album), 2015
- Chapter One (May D album), 2013
- Chapter One (Viking Skull EP) (2003)
- Chapter 1 (g.o.d album), 1999
- Chapter 1, a 2026 album by Sault
- Chapter 1 (Yuma Nakayama album), 2014
- Chapter 1 (EP), by Kane Brown (2016)
- Chapter One: Blue, a 2017 EP by Bea Miller
- Chapter One: Book of Entrance, 1996 album by Bill Laswell
- Chapter One: Complete Collection, 2008 album by Beni Arashiro
- Chapter One: Latin America, a 1973 album by Gato Barbieri
- Chapter One: Greatest Hits (2002), by Jay Z
- Chapter 1: Love, Pain & Forgiveness, 2001 album by Syleena Johnson
- Chapter 1: The End, 1996 album by Three 6 Mafia
- Chapter I: A New Beginning, 1998 album by The Moffats
- Chapter I: Monarchy, 2020 album by Ad Infinitum
- Greatest Hits – Chapter One (Kelly Clarkson album) (2012)
- The Hits – Chapter One (Backstreet Boys album) (2001)
- The Hits Chapter 1 (Sammy Kershaw album) (1995)
- Soul Assassins, Chapter 1 (1997), by Soul Assassins
- Chapter One (2007), by the Olympic Symphonium
- Chapter 1, by Mae Muller (2019)
- "Chapter 1" (song), by SID (2006)

== Films ==
- Bicchugatti: Chapter 1, a 2020 Indian Kannada-language film
- Dhruva Natchathiram: Chapter One, a 2023 Indian Tamil-language film
- Kantara: Chapter 1, a 2025 Indian Kannada-language action film
- KGF: Chapter 1, a 2018 Indian period action film
- Kesari Chapter 1 or Kesari (2019 film), an Indian Hindi-language film by Anurag Singh
- Lokah Chapter 1: Chandra, a 2025 Indian Malayalam-language superhero film by Dominic Arun
- Mafia: Chapter 1, a 2020 Indian Tamil-language film
- Totapuri: Chapter 1, a 2022 Indian Kannada-language film
- Hindutva Chapter One, a 2022 Indian Hindi-language film by Karan Razdan
- Kaliachak Chapter 1, a 2024 Indian Bengali-language film by Ratool Mukherjee
- Mission: Chapter 1, 2024 Indian Tamil-language film by A. L. Vijay
- Bhagwat Chapter One: Raakshas, a 2025 Indian Hindi-language film

== Television ==
- "Chapter 1" (American Horror Story)
- "Chapter 1" (Eastbound & Down)
- "Chapter 1" (House of Cards)
- "Chapter 1" (Legion)
- "Chapter 1" (Star Wars: Clone Wars), an episode of Star Wars: Clone Wars
- "Chapter 1" (Uncoupled)
- "Chapter 1: Homme Fatale", an episode of A Murder at the End of the World
- "Chapter 1: The Mandalorian", an episode of the first season of The Mandalorian
- "Chapter 1: Stranger in a Strange Land", the first episode of The Book of Boba Fett
- "Chapter One" (Boston Public)
- "Chapter One: Cerebral LOLzy", an episode of Special
- "Chapter One: Make Your Mark", an episode of Barry
- "Chapter One: October Country", an episode of Chilling Adventures of Sabrina
- "Chapter One: Once Upon a Time in New York", an episode of Katy Keene
- "Chapter One: The River's Edge", the pilot episode of Riverdale
- Episodes of Stranger Things:
  - "Chapter One: The Vanishing of Will Byers", season 1
  - "Chapter One: MADMAX", season 2
  - "Chapter One: Suzie, Do You Copy?", season 3
  - "Chapter One: The Hellfire Club", season 4
  - "Chapter One: The Crawl", season 5

== Other uses ==
- Chapter I of the Constitution of Australia
- Chapter One of the Constitution of South Africa
- Al-Fatiha, the first chapter of Quran
- Chapter One (restaurant), a restaurant in Dublin
- Spider-Man: Chapter One, a comic book series

== See also ==
- The First Chapter (disambiguation)
