= I Fell in Love (Rockell song) =

Single by Rockell

from the album What Are You Lookin' At?
- Released: October 15, 1996
- Genre: Freestyle, dance
- Length: 4:34
- Label: Robbins Entertainment
- Songwriter: Ewart A Wilson Jr

Rockell singles chronology
"I Fell in Love" (1996)	"In a Dream" (1997)

"I Fell In Love" is the debut single by American freestyle/dance music singer Rockell, from her 1998 debut album, What Are You Lookin' At?. In the United States, the song achieved moderate success, peaking at No. 61. In Canada, the song did better, reaching No. 8 on the Canadian singles chart.

== Lyrics and background ==
The song describes a broken romance. She falls in love and gives her heart only to be hurt as the guy walks out of her life. She says she does not need his love anymore and is glad to be free. The song has a night club rhythm with a classic freestyle beat.

== Track listing ==
US CD single

No.	Title	Length
1.	"I Fell in Love" (radio version)	4:34
2.	"I Fell in Love" (extended version)	6:21
3.	"I Fell in Love" (instrumental)	3:43
4.	"I Fell in Love" (house mix)	4:10
5.	"I Fell in Love" (acappella)	4:46

== Chart positions ==
Chart	Peak position
Canadian Singles Chart	8
Canada RPM Dance	4
US Rhythmic Top 40	15
US Billboard Hot 100	61
US Hot Dance Singles Sales	9

=== Year-end charts ===
Chart (1997)	Peak position
Canada RPM Top 50 Dance Tracks	35
