= Lucas Prata =

American singer-songwriter

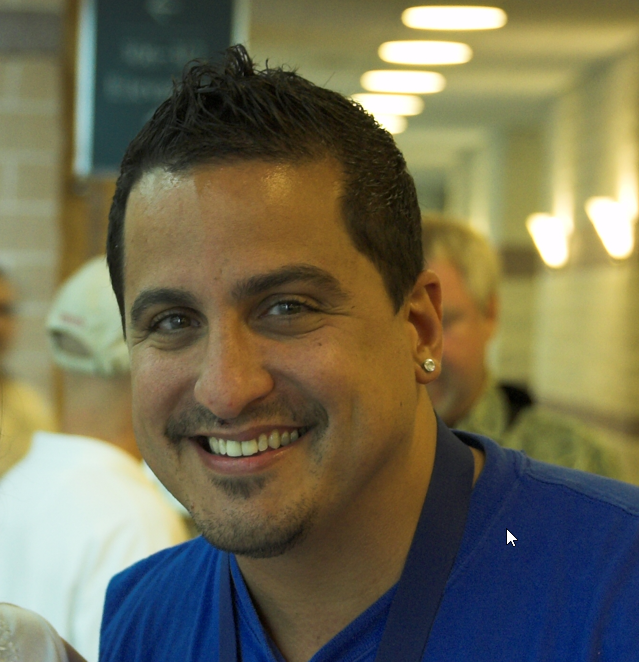
- Prata in 2006

Background information
- Born: Lucas Prata; December 30, 1978 (age 46); Queens, New York, U.S.
- Genres: Dance-pop, House
- Labels: Robbins Entertainment, Ultra Records

Lucas Prata (born December 30, 1978) is an American house musician and DJ from New York City. His singles include "Never Be Alone", "And She Said", "Love of My Life", and "Let's Get It On". Prata and Dan Bălan produced The "Ma Ya Hi Song", an English version of the international hit "Dragostea din tei" by Bălan's original band, O-Zone.

== Early life and career ==
Prata was born in Bayside, Queens, New York, in 1978. He attended the University of Miami in Florida, where he was a member of the Sigma Phi Epsilon fraternity. In his senior year, Prata won the Mr. University of Miami contest.

After graduating with a double major in business and sociology and a minor in theater, Prata moved back to New York and recorded and released his own singles, while appearing as a dancer on the MTV show Club MTV, hosted by Downtown Julie Brown. He subsequently worked as a backing dancer for George LaMond for 10 years.

== Pop success ==
In the summer of 2000, Prata joined Salt-n-Pepa as the opening act for their 96-city North American tour, around the time of his hit single "Fly Away". At an audition at the C+C Music Factory studios, Prata met Ricky Crespo, the programmer/co-producer for C+C, and they began working together on music that was played on major radio stations across the US. Prata's hit single "Let's get it on" became a #1 hit in 18 markets in the US.

Over the following months, Prata's singles "Never Be Alone", "And She Said", and "Love of My Life" (featuring Reina) all received substantial airplay on radio stations WKTU and WMPH. The second single from his debut album, "And She Said", had crossover success on the New York City pop station, Z100 where it gained national exposure, holding the #1 dance airplay single spot for four consecutive weeks in Billboard. The track became the 2006 New York Mets anthem, in a parody version, "And We Say...Let's Go Mets", written by David Brody from New York's Elvis Duran and the Morning Show, which Prata performed live at the team's 2006 postseason rally on October 3. The song and its video were regularly played at Shea Stadium during the 2006 season and postseason. The song also enjoyed commercial success internationally. A Christmas version of the song was also recorded by Prata and released in December.

== 2006-present ==
In 2006, while Prata was working as promotions director at Miami's Party 93.1, his single "Let's Get It On" became the #1 requested record at the station. Prata was the featured performer on an episode of MTV's My Super Sweet Sixteen in 2006.

In 2007, Prata's album Never Stop Dreamin' was licensed by Ministry of Sound in the UK. A track from the album, "I Think I'm Falling In Love" was released in Sweden with mixes by Da Buzz, and the following U.S. single, "We've Got It Going On", was also remixed by the producer, Discopunx. His next single was "DYWM", a cover of The Human League's "Don't You Want Me" performed as a duet with Kim Sozzi. It was debuted live on New Year's Eve at Mirage on Long Island, and later performed live at WKTU Beatstock Festival on August 19, 2007.

In March 2007 and March 2008, Prata performed with Reina at a benefit event for Muscular Dystrophy hosted by two high schools in Staten Island.

In 2008, Prata released a remake of "Something About You" by Level 42, a duet with George Lamond. In 2008 Coca-Cola and the Olympics used "And She Said" as part of their campaign, along with a bottle dedicated to the song and Prata for China.

Prata now works as a mentor and consultant for young talent from his home in New Jersey, while continuing to write for other artists.

=== Albums ===
- "Let's Get It On" 2005 Ultra Records, Avex Trax (Japan Release)
- "Never Stop Dreamin'" May 20, 2008
- Christmas With Lucas Prata (Lucas Prata Album) December 2008 Ultra Records

=== Singles ===
Year	Song	U.S. Pop	U.S. Club/Dance	U.S. Dance Airplay	U.S. Dance Singles Sales
2000	"Fly Away"	-	-	-	-
2003	"Never Be Alone"	-	10	-	-
2004	"And She Said"	66	1	1	8
2005	"Love Of My Life" (feat. Reina)	-	2	1	-
2006	"Let's Get It On"	-	-	2	-
2007	"We Got It Going On"	-	-	-	-
2007	"I Think I'm Falling In Love"	-	5	-	-
2007	"Don't You Want Me" (with Kim Sozzi)	-	15	-	-
2008	"Something About You" (feat. George Lamond)	-	10	-	-
2008	"A Girl Like That" (feat. Jeannie Ortega)	-	10	-	-
2009	"Remember (La Di Da)"	-	10	-	-
2011	"First Night of My Life" (feat. Lenny B)	52	1	-	-
