= In a Dream =

In a Dream may refer to:

- "In a Dream" (song), a 1997 song by Rockell
- In a Dream, a 2014 album by American electronic musician the Juan MacLean.
- In a Dream (film), a 2008 documentary
- In a Dream (EP), a 2020 EP by Troye Sivan
- En rêve (Nocturne), a work by Franz Liszt (S.207) also referred to as "In a Dream"
