= The Dance (song) =

1990 single by Garth Brooks

Single by Garth Brooks

from the album Garth Brooks
- B-side: "If Tomorrow Never Comes"
- Released: April 30, 1990
- Recorded: November 1, 1988
- Studio: Jack's Tracks (Nashville, Tennessee)
- Genre: Country
- Length: 3:40
- Label: Capitol Nashville
- Songwriter: Tony Arata
- Producer: Allen Reynolds

Garth Brooks singles chronology
| "Not Counting You" (1990) | "The Dance" (1990) | "Friends in Low Places" (1990) |

"The Dance" is a song written by Tony Arata and recorded by American country music singer Garth Brooks as the tenth and final track from his self-titled debut album, from which it was also released as the album's fourth and final single in April 1990. It is considered by many to be Brooks' signature song. In a 2015 interview with Patrick Kielty of BBC Radio 2, Brooks credits the back to back success of both "The Dance" and its follow up "Friends in Low Places" for his phenomenal success.

== Background ==
At the opening of the music video, Brooks explains that the song is written with a double meaning – both as a love song about the end of a passionate relationship, and a story of someone dying because of something he believes in, after a moment of glory.

The song is written in the key of G major and is set in the time signature of common time with a tempo of 69 beats per minute.

== Music video ==
The song's music video, directed by John Lloyd Miller, features an introduction by Brooks himself explaining the alternative meaning of the song. The video shows several American icons and examples of people who died for a dream. These include archive footage of the following:

- Lane Frost - World Champion bull rider, who was killed in 1989 by the bull he rode for a full eight seconds during a rodeo.
- Keith Whitley - Country singer who died in 1989 from alcohol poisoning. The Whitley scenes featured his then-wife Lorrie Morgan.
- Martin Luther King Jr. - Baptist minister who is best known for his involvement in the Civil Rights Movement and was assassinated in 1968.
- The crew of the Space Shuttle Challenger, shortly before it disintegrated after its launch in 1986.
- John F. Kennedy - President of the United States who was assassinated in 1963.
- John Wayne - Film actor best known for his roles in Westerns and died of cancer in 1979.

It was awarded Video of the Year at the 1990 ACM Music Awards.

== Cover versions ==
Country music singer Martina McBride covered the song from the television special George Strait: ACM Artist of the Decade All Star Concert.

As well it was cover by Westlife in their album "The Love Album" in 2006.The Love Album (Westlife album)

== Chart performance ==
On the Billboard Hot Country Songs chart, The Dance reached number one and remained there for three consecutive weeks until it was knocked off by "Good Times" by Dan Seals.

== Release and reception ==
Released near the beginning of his career, "The Dance" was a hit single around the world, including the United States, Europe, and Ireland, charting inside the British pop top 40. The song cemented Brooks as a country superstar and made him the face of the country music explosion during the 90s. In 1990, it was named both Song of the Year and Video of the Year by the Academy of Country Music. It was awarded the number 14 position in the CMT 100 Greatest Songs of Country Music broadcast in 2003 and also the number 5 position on the network's The Greatest: 100 Greatest Music Videos special in 2004.

In a 1994 Playboy interview, Brooks said, "unless I am totally surprised, The Dance will be the greatest success as a song we will ever do. I'll go to my grave with The Dance. It'll probably always be my favorite song."

In 2001, after the death of Dale Earnhardt, Brooks was invited to the NASCAR awards ceremony that was honoring Earnhardt to play the song as a tribute. The song has been used as several country stations' last song before changing formats. It was also the second song to be played on UK station Country 1035, the first being another Brooks number.

On February 6, 2014, "The Dance" was performed by Brooks on the final episode of The Tonight Show with Jay Leno on NBC.

In 2024, Rolling Stone ranked the song at #111 on its 200 Greatest Country Songs of All Time ranking.

== Track listing ==
U.S. 7-inch promotional single Capitol Nashville NR-44629, 1990

1. "The Dance" - 3:37
2. "The Dance"

U.S. 7" jukebox single Liberty S7-17441-A, 1990

1. "The Dance" - 3:41
2. "If Tomorrow Never Comes"

U.K. CD single Capitol CDCLS-735, 1993
Disc 1

1. "The Dance"
2. "Friends in Low Places"
3. "Victim of the Game"
4. "Kickin' & Screamin'

Disc 2

1. "The Dance"
2. "Friends in Low Places"
3. "The River" (live acoustic version)

== Chart positions ==
| Chart (1990) | Peak position |
|---|---|
| Canada Country Singles (RPM) | 1 |
| Europe (Eurochart Hot 100) | 89 |
| Irish Singles Chart | 3 |
| Scottish Singles Chart | 31 |
| UK Singles Chart | 36 |
| US Hot Country Songs (Billboard) | 1 |

=== Year-end charts ===
| Chart (1990) | Position |
|---|---|
| Canada Country Tracks (RPM) | 8 |
| US Country Songs (Billboard) | 13 |

== Rockell version ==
"The Dance"

Single by Rockell

from the album Instant Pleasure
- Released: August 1, 2000
- Genre: Freestyle, dance
- Length: 4:04
- Label: Robbins Entertainment
- Songwriter: Tony Arata

Rockell singles chronology
| "When I'm Gone" (1999) | "The Dance" (2000) | "What U Did 2 Me" (2001) |

"The Dance" is the fifth single in the overall discography of American freestyle recording artist Rockell. It is the first single she released from her second album, Instant Pleasure. There was no video made for this single.

== Track listing ==
US CD single

| No. | Title | Length |
|---|---|---|
| 1. | "The Dance" (The Hex/Dez Radio Mix) | 4:09 |
| 2. | "The Dance" (The Hex/Dez Club Mix) | 9:21 |

== Chart positions ==
| Chart | Peak position |
|---|---|
| US Hot Dance Singles Sales | 27 |
