= Cory Robbins =

American record executive (born 1957)

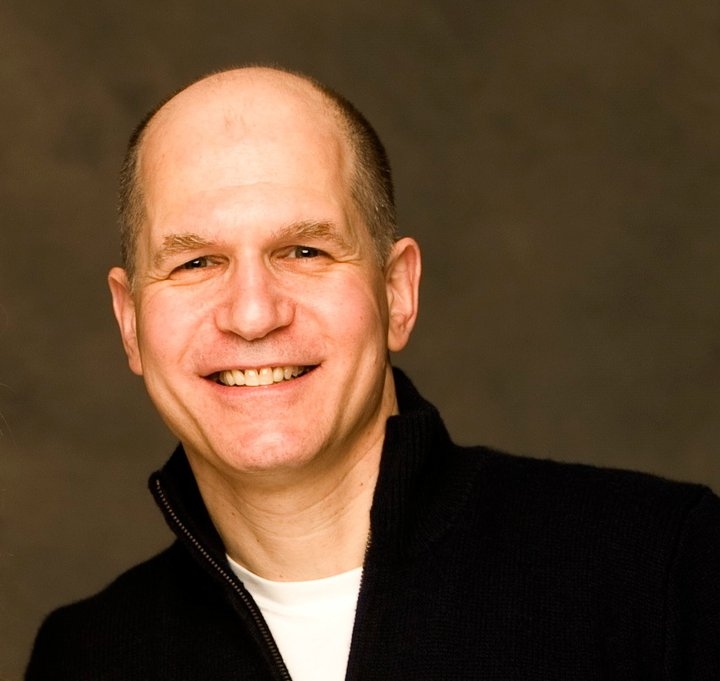
- Born: September 23, 1957 (age 69); Brooklyn, New York City, U.S.
- Occupation: Music executive
- Known for: Co-founder of Profile Records and founder of Robbins Entertainment

Cory Robbins (born September 23, 1957) is an American record executive. Robbins founded two influential record labels.

The first, Profile Records (in business from 1981 to 1996; Robbins left in 1994), grew to become a large independent label that proved key in the rise of hip-hop as a commercially viable genre, most notably in breaking hip-hop's first multiplatinum act, Run-D.M.C.

The second, Robbins Entertainment (founded in 1996), has been a pioneer charting dance music's course into the 21st century.

Robbins is currently the owner and president of Robbins Entertainment, which is based in New York City's Tribeca neighborhood.

== Early life ==
Robbins was born to Warren and Paula Robbins in Brooklyn, NY. His family spent the first part of his life in Hollis, Queens — the same neighborhood where the members of his future artists Run-D.M.C. grew up. Robbins father was a "closeout specialist" of wholesale clothing and ran a small chain of clothing stores in suburban New York and New Jersey called the Sample Nook. The Robbins family relocated to Rockland County, north of the city, in 1964.

=== Baskin Robbins rumor ===
Contrary to some accounts, Cory Robbins was not the heir to any "Baskin Robbins" fortune. Irvine "Irv" Robbins, the co-founder of Baskin Robbins, was born in Canada and lived on the West Coast. Cory Robbins' father Warren was in the retail clothing business.

== Career ==
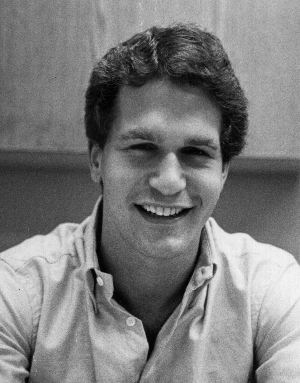
Cory Robbins, circa early 1980s

=== Midland International ===
Robbins formed a band in high school called The Centrifugal Force, and wrote songs with the hope of pitching them to publishers, record companies, and artists. In 1974, a 16-year-old Cory Robbins was shopping his songwriting demos in New York City when he met Bob Reno, the head of Midland International Records, which had success with disco tracks like Silver Convention's "Fly, Robin, Fly," signed by Midland's A&R man Eddie O'Loughlin.

Reno passed on Robbins' demos, but he eventually offered Robbins a summer job. During Robbins' freshman year in college, Reno coaxed Robbins to drop out and come work for Midland's publishing arm, picking and pitching songs.

Robbins left Midland to pursue a career as a DJ and record producer. He sold his first production, "Keep It Up" by Nightfall, to RCA in 1977 for $4,000. Robbins also produced "Doin' The Best That I Can" by Bettye LaVette for West End Records in 1978.

=== Panorama ===
On a recommendation from Eddie O'Loughlin, in 1977 Robbins landed a job working for MCA Music Publishing, where Robbins signed songwriter/producer Patrick Adams. The deal spawned several disco hits including the classic, "(Push Push) In The Bush." Robbins' success led to his being asked, at the age of 21, to run MCA Music Publishing's new record label, Panorama (distributed by RCA Records).

At Panorama, Robbins signed groups like Frank Hooker & Positive People and The Fantastic Aleems. And in late 1979, during the novel success of "Rapper's Delight" by the Sugar Hill Gang, he attempted, unsuccessfully, to sign the first "rapping" Christmas song. "Christmas Rapping" by Kurtis Blow ended up on Mercury Records.

Earlier that same year, Robbins also signed and produced a Top 5 Billboard disco song called "Love Insurance," (co-produced and arranged by Rick Tell) released under the name of Front Page. The songwriter, Steve Plotnicki, became friendly with Robbins, and they began to discuss opening their own record company to release 12-inch singles.

=== Profile Records ===
==== Founding Profile ====
Cory Robbins and Steve Plotnicki opened Profile Records in May 1981 with $34,000 in loans from their parents. The first releases on Profile were not successful. Down to their last $2,000, Plotnicki suggested that they spend part of that money recording a rap version of "Genius of Love" by the Tom Tom Club. Robbins enlisted two rappers, Alonzo Brown and Andre Harrell — who called themselves Dr. Jeckyll & Mr. Hyde - to perform the song they called "Genius Rap," which eventually sold over 150,000 copies and, in effect, saved the company.

Robbins and Plotnicki decided to concentrate more of their efforts on rap music, and increased their signings in that area. Profile had another rap hit with the Disco Four ("Whip Rap"), and its first notable success in R&B with Sharon Brown's "I Specialize In Love." Robbins handled the A&R and promotion end of the company's affairs, and Plotnicki focused on sales and finance.

==== Run-D.M.C. ====
In early 1983, Kurtis Blow's manager, Russell Simmons, brought by an unconventional demo tape from a rap group he called "Runde-MC" (Simmons' brother Joe as "DJ Run" and Joe's friend Daryll McDaniels as "D.M.C."). Cory Robbins listened to the tape overnight and the next morning made Simmons a $2,000 offer for the group's first single.

Run-DMC's first single "It's Like That/Sucker M.C.s," was an almost instant smash in the streets of New York City, and ended up a hit on national Black radio, rising to #15 on the Billboard R&B charts in the Spring of 1983. A string of other successful singles led Profile in 1984 to invest in the company's first rap album, "Run-D.M.C.," which became the first-ever rap album to be certified Gold by the RIAA, selling over 500,000 copies. Profile also produced the first-ever video by a rap group to make it onto MTV, Run-D.M.C.'s "Rock Box."

Run-DMC followed with their second album, "King Of Rock," in 1985 (which eventually went Platinum with more than 1,000,000 copies sold) — and then "Raising Hell" in 1986 (the first rap album to be certified Triple-Platinum).

Run-D.M.C. became rap's most successful act in the mid 1980s, and buoyed the fortunes of Profile Records and its owners, enabling them to expand their roster and have successes not only in rap — with acts like Dana Dane — but also in other types of music.

==== Other genres ====
Even though most of Profile's creative and financial success stemmed from rap records, Cory Robbins always strove to establish Profile Records as a label with a diverse roster. Profile Records released the instrumental Hip-Hop/breakdance classic "Rainforest" by Paul Hardcastle, a British electro- and synth-funk artist.

Profile Records also signed a pop group called Boys Don't Cry and released their single, "I Wanna Be A Cowboy," at an opportune time: the short-lived 1986 major-label boycott of the independent promoters who virtually controlled the programming at much of American pop radio. Robbins took advantage by enlisting the services of those promoters during that lull in corporate business. The result was that "I Wanna Be A Cowboy" rose to #12 on the Billboard Hot 100, an almost impossible feat for a small, independent label like Profile.

Profile Records also had respected artists in the genres of freestyle (Judy Torres), Heavy Metal (Murphy's Law), and eventually Dancehall (Barrington Levy).

==== The Golden Era ====
Profile Records saw success with its signed artist, Run-D.M.C. This may have been one of many factors leading to this time becoming known as the Golden Era of hip-hop. Those years (from the late 1980s into the early 1990s), was also Profile's greatest period of creative and commercial success.

Cory Robbins signed or oversaw the signings of the following artists: Dana Dane, Rob Base & D.J. EZ Rock, Special Ed, Poor Righteous Teachers, DJ Quik, King Sun, 2nd II None, and N2Deep, among others.

==== Landmark ====
In the late 1980s, following Profile Records' Gold and Platinum successes with Run-D.M.C., Dana Dane, Rob Base and others, Cory Robbins and Steve Plotnicki entertained distribution and purchase offers from major record conglomerates. Robbins and Plotnicki vowed not to sell off their best assets to major labels — as other independents had done — and rejected distribution offers. Instead, Profile made a bid to become a "mini-major" by buying up and/or starting a number of regional record distributors across the country and uniting them into a network, thus giving them national coverage similar to the major labels.

The distribution company, Landmark, was an important player in the indie record landscape in the 1990s, also selling records from labels like Tommy Boy and Select.

==== Endgame ====
Landmark became a point of tension between Cory Robbins and his partner. Landmark required a certain flow of product from Profile and its other client labels in order to remain profitable. Plotnicki is reported to have urged Robbins to increase the number of annual releases from Profile, a tactic which Robbins resisted, ostensibly for the health and reputation of the mother label.

The rift between Robbins and Plotnicki grew throughout 1993 as they fielded yet another purchase offer, this one from Tom Silverman's Tommy Boy Records and its owner, Time Warner. The argument between Robbins and Plotnicki scuttled the Time Warner deal, and in early 1994, Robbins negotiated his departure from Profile Records.

=== Robbins Entertainment ===
==== Early years ====
In late 1994, Cory Robbins began talks with major labels to form a new record company. Strauss Zelnick, the CEO of BMG, made Robbins an offer, and after negotiations throughout 1995, Robbins Entertainment launched in early 1996 as a joint venture with BMG.

In its first months, Robbins Entertainment scored hits. Its second single, "Jellyhead" by Crush, spent over 20 weeks on the Billboard Hot 100. Freestyle artist Rockell debuted with "I Fell In Love," which was a top 10 dance single and spent 18 weeks on the Billboard Hot 100.

At first, Robbins followed the tried-and-true model he had created at Profile Records, focusing on singles from a variety of genres, and compilation albums of licensed material.

In 1996, Robbins launched the "Strip Jointz" series — compilation albums of songs favored in "gentlemen's clubs." The first Strip Jointz album sold over 100,000 copies. That series was followed by the Super Rare Disco and Dance Party and Trance Party compilations, which sold millions of albums for the label.

==== Focusing on dance ====
Non-dance artists did not prove to be profitable for Robbins Entertainment. Notably, rock artists H2SO4 and Meg Hentges were well-played on radio, but sales were anemic. After these disappointments, Cory Robbins decided in the year 2000 to focus exclusively on dance music.

The following years were the most successful for the label. Robbins launched its Best of Trance and Best of House compilations, and in 2002, scored its first Billboard Top 10 pop hit with a remake of Bryan Adams' "Heaven" by DJ Sammy & Yanou featuring Do.

Robbins' successes enabled him to buy back BMG's share of the label, and in 2002 took complete ownership of the company, retaining the distribution deal with BMG.

==== Robbins in the digital age ====
The ascent of digital music in the 21st Century was both bane and boon to Robbins Entertainment. On one hand, the implosion of record retailers virtually wiped out Robbins' compilation album business. On the other, dance music always thrived on singles sales, and never more so than in the digital age. Digital download services meant that Robbins' dance singles would never go out of print, and Robbins Entertainment's perennial favorites — like sports anthem "Sandstorm" by Darude — continued to sell by the thousands every week, for years after their initial release.

Robbins spelled out his digital music philosophy in a 2002 interview with Radio & Records:

"The business as a whole should figure out a way to give the people what they want. If people want to be able to download and make their own CDs of any music they want, you have to do that. That's the only way it's going to work. Otherwise, they’re going to continue to find a way to get it for free. The position that we want people to buy CDs is wrong. Sure, I’d like people to buy CDs, but if that's not what they want to buy, we have to figure out how to give them what they want."

Robbins Entertainment continues to have pop and dance successes, as well as steady income from sync licensing. Among their latest hits are "Evacuate the Dancefloor" by Cascada (2009) and "Take Over Control" by Afrojack (2011).

== Awards ==
- Robbins Entertainment won Best Dance Label in 2002 and 2003 at the Winter Music Conference.
- Cory Robbins won Best Label Executive in 2011 and 2012 at the Promo Only Summer Sessions.
- Robbins Entertainment has 9 R.I.A.A. certified Gold or Platinum singles in the US.
- Robbins Entertainment has had three top 10 singles on the Billboard Hot 100:

"Heaven" by DJ Sammy & Yanou featuring Do (2002, #8)
"Listen To Your Heart" by D.H.T. (2005, #8)
"Everytime We Touch" by Cascada (2006, #10)

== Discography ==
- Profile Records Discography
- Robbins Entertainment Discography
- Cory Robbins Discography
