= Vyacheslav Tyurin =

Russian record producer, music executive

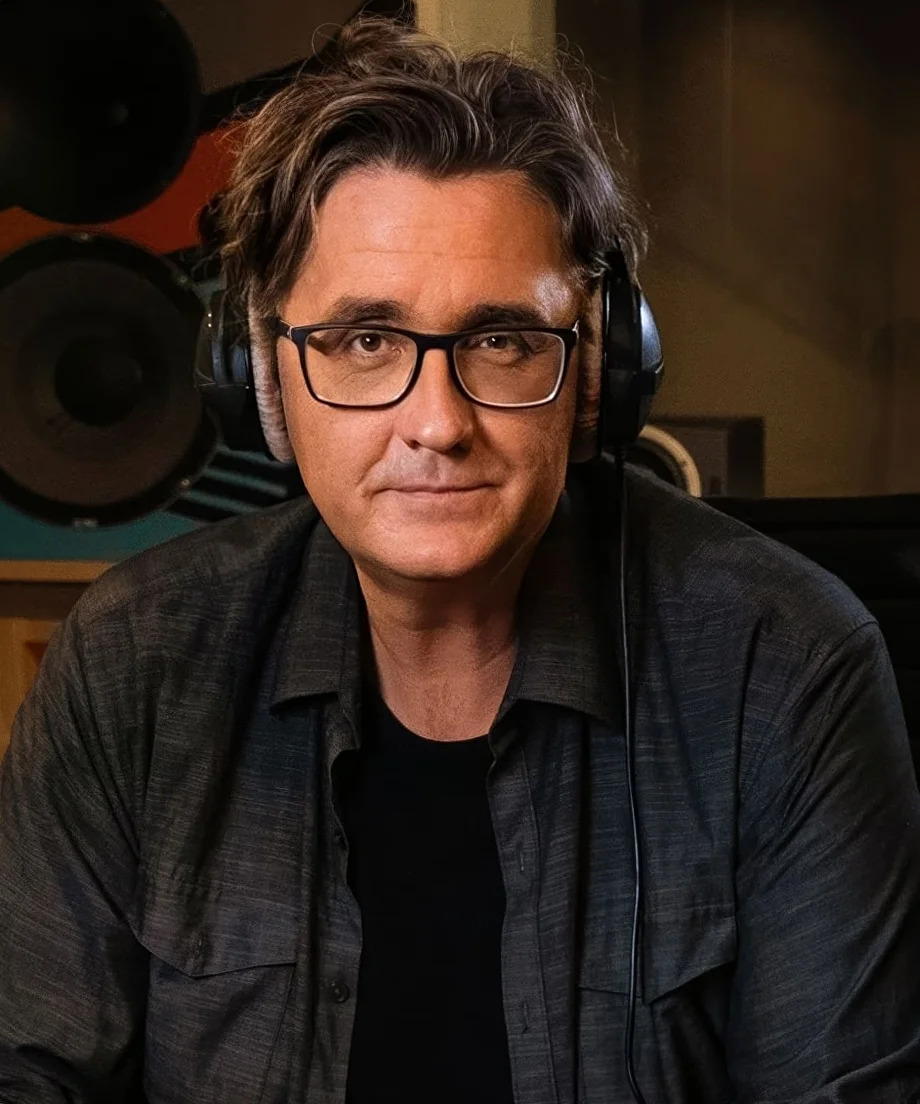
- Born: Vyacheslav Vladimirovich Tyurin; 16 May 1967 (age 59); Novosibirsk, Soviet Union
- Citizenship: Soviet Union→Russia
- Spouse: Irina Nelson
- Awards: Knight of the Order of Russia "For Professionalism and Impeccable Business Reputation", winner of 21 national music awards
- Website: https://reflexmusic.ru/

Vyacheslav Vladimirovich Tyurin (Russian: Вячесла́в Влади́мирович Тю́рин; born 16 May 1967, in Novosibirsk, Novosibirsk Oblast) is a Russian composer, producer, music video maker, director. President of Reflexmusic и VIVITI.

He is the author of songs by Irene Nelson and the musical groups REFLEX, Litsey, Non Stop, Electroversia, by singers Natalia Gulkina, Shura, Irina Saltykova, Sasha Project, Slava, Kristina Orbakaitė, Elvira T, and Alyona Sviridova.

== Biography ==
=== Electroversia ===
In 1989, in Novosibirsk, he formed the group Electroversia, the keyboardist of which was Pavel Yesenin, the future composer and producer of the Hi-Fi group. At the same time, Tyurin met the soloist of the jazz big band Irina Tereshina (better known under the pseudonym Irina Nelson) and began to collaborate with her.

=== Diana ===
In 1992, he moved to Moscow, where he became a producer of the TV-show Autograph on Saturdays on Channel One, and also worked in the TV-show Up to 16 and older.

In 1993 he created the project Diana, positioning Irina as a solo performer. The name was chosen in tribute to the singer Diana Ross. Over the years of the project's existence, six records, a remix album and a compilation album The Best of Diana were released

In 1999, Vyacheslav Tyurin closed the project, justifying this by the loss of interest in its further development, associated with the close framework of the pop genre.

=== REFLEX group ===
In 1999, he created the REFLEX group.

In 2002, Vyacheslav founded the Reflexmusic record company, the purpose of which was to promote dance music in Russia.

In 2003, while working on the group's video for the song Non-Stop, he collaborated with the players of the Russian National football Team — Sergey Ovchinnikov and Dmitry Bulykin, inviting them to take part in the filming of the video.

In August 2003, Tyurin presented REFLEX at the international music festival Pop Komm, held in Cologne. Paul Van Dyke, one of the world's leading trance DJs, transferred to Reflexmusic the rights to release his album Reflections in Russia. Vyacheslav also collaborated with the London label Ministry Of Sound and worked with such Western European musicians as: DJ Bobo, The Bhangra Knights project, System in Blue, Dj Freza, Dj Voodoo.

In the spring of 2004, he signed a contract with the German company Babelspark and Sony Music to release a new single of REFLEX — I Can't Live Without You. The disc went on sale in music stores in Germany, Austria and Switzerland, reached the 11th place in the VIVA video clips chart and the 4th place in the German sales charts.

In 2006, Vyacheslav Tyurin was awarded the Order "For Professionalism and Business Reputation" of the III degree.

During the years of producing the group, he was awarded such awards as: Ovation, two Stop-hit awards, two Bomb of the Year titles, three Golden Gramophone awards, Popov Award in the field of Radio Broadcasting, as the most frequently rotated group on Russian radio stations, two ZD Awards in the nomination The best dance project, etc.

=== Irina Nelson ===
In January 2007, Vyacheslav Tyurintook over a music studio in Dubai VipStudioDubai, where he was invited by the Department of Culture of the United Arab Emirates to produce music and create soundtracks. Simultaneously, he produced the German pop group Systems in Blue (ex. Blue System).

After the end of the contract in Dubai, Vyacheslav Tyurin started promoting Irene Nelson as a solo singer on the international music market, and the Reflex group continued performing without her. To record new material, he chose the Air studio in London, owned by The Beatles producer George Martin. Vyacheslav was assisted in his creation by sound engineer Steve Orchard, who collaborated with U2, Paul McCartney, George Michael, Coldplay, Peter Gabriel, Dido and other musicians.

In 2009 Vyacheslav Tyurin moved to America, to Los Angeles, and created his record label NTMG in the United States. He worked together with the American producer and composer Gary Miller, with the companies Universal Music Group and Bungalow Music.

In January 2010 English single of Irene Nelson, "Sunrise", debuted on Billboard's Hot Dance Club Play at number 45, and moved up to 37 by April 3, 2010.

In 2011, Vyacheslav tried his hand at creating soundtracks. In the studio he founded in Malibu (California) together with a companion (Gary Miller), he wrote the music for Vera Storozheva's — film My Boyfriend is an Angel, which was released in Russian in December of the same year.

Having signed a distribution agreement with Universal and a contract with the PR company LCO, after the worldwide release of Irina Nelson's debut album Sun Generation, he returned to Moscow.

=== Irina Nelson and REFLEX group ===
In 2012, he reunited the former line-up of the REFLEX group, returning Nelson to the collective as the main soloist, without interrupting her solo career. At the moment, there are two projects under Vyacheslav's leadership.

In the summer of 2013, together with Victoria Dementieva, he wrote the official anthem of the World Athletics Championships.

Vyacheslav Tyurin continues to collaborate with Gary Miller and Button Entertainment on the production of filmsoundtracks. During this time, soundtracks were released: for the full-length film My Boyfriend is an Angel, the cartoon Ot Vinta, for the television series Divorce (directed by Denis Evstigneev, Channel One) and Sherlock Holmes (dir. Andrey Kavun, Russia-1 TV channel).

=== VIVITI ===
In 2017 Vyacheslav Tyurin founded the VIVITI group. In this project he released the singles My Sunny, My Funny, Play Girl, Somewhere, Tomorrow Will Never Come. Tyurin performed the songs with his own voice. In May 2020, he founded the international music record company VIVITI in Dubai.

=== Directing ===
Vyacheslav is a music video maker, cameraman and director of many video clips of his projects.

Item	Original Title	Performer	Vyacheslav's role in the making of the video
1	Встречай новый день	REFLEX	Director
2	Сколько лет, сколько зим	REFLEX	Director
3	Сойти с ума	REFLEX	Director, cameraman
4	Non Stop	REFLEX	Scriptwriter
5	Я тебя всегда буду ждать	REFLEX	Scriptwriter
6	Мне трудно говорить	REFLEX	Scriptwriter
7	Падали звёзды	REFLEX	Director, cameraman
8	Жёсткое диско	REFLEX	Scriptwriter
9	Половинка	REFLEX	Director, cameraman
10	Научи любить	REFLEX	Director
11	Тёплое солнце	Ирина Нельсон	Director, cameraman
12	Я буду небом твоим	Ирина Нельсон и REFLEX	Director, cameraman
13	Если небо не за нас	Ирина Нельсон и REFLEX	Director, cameraman
14	Художник	Ирина Нельсон и REFLEX	Director
15	Взрослые девочки	Ирина Нельсон и REFLEX	Director
16	Все что хотела	Ирина Нельсон и REFLEX	Director
17	Говори со мной	Ирина Нельсон и REFLEX	Director
18	Ты не узнаешь...	Ирина Нельсон и REFLEX	Director
19	После тебя	Ирина Нельсон и REFLEX	Director
20	Бросай оружие	Ирина Нельсон и REFLEX	Director
21	В Московском небе	Ирина Нельсон и REFLEX	Director
22	Зима (Version 2018)	Ирина Нельсон и REFLEX	Director
23	Встречай новый день (Version 2019)	Ирина Нельсон и REFLEX	Director
24	Давай, танцуй	Ирина Нельсон и REFLEX	Director

== Discography ==
1991

Diana — Я хочу любить тебя

Diana — Королева

1993

Diana — Джонни

Diana — album «Я хочу любить!»

Diana — Белая песня

Diana — album «Я вернусь»

1996

Diana — Не говори

Diana — Грешная любовь

Diana — Я тебя провожаю

Diana — album «Не говори...»

1997

Diana — Гори, гори, ясно!

Diana — album «Гори, гори ясно!»

Mona Lisa — Дождь

1998

Diana — Скатертью дорога!

Diana — Не целуй её

Diana — album «Скатертью дорога!»

Diana — album «Не целуй её (Dance Remix)»

Diana — Уеду с тобой

1999

Strelki feat. Diana — Танцы на облаках

Diana — Не жалей о том

Diana — «Радио любви» album (in 2017, a remastered version of the unreleased album was released)

REFLEX — Дальний свет (Line-up: I. Nelson)

REFLEX — Distant Light (English version of the song «Дальний свет») [Line-up: I. Nelson]

Caramel— Испугай беду

Caramel— Где ты раньше был

ТТ — Потерянный рай

2000

REFLEX — Встречай новый день (Line-up: I. Nelson, О. Kosheleva, D. Davidovskiy)

Shura — А просто осень пришла

Igor Butskov — Девочка моя

2001

REFLEX — album «Встречай новый день» (Line-up: I. Nelson, О. Kosheleva, D. Davidovskiy)

REFLEX — Сойти с ума (Line-up: I. Nelson, О. Kosheleva, D. Davidovskiy)

REFLEX — album «Сойти с ума» (reissue of «Встречай новый день») [Line-up: I. Nelson, О. Kosheleva, D. Davidovskiy]

2002

REFLEX — Первый раз (Line-up: I. Nelson, А. Torganova, G. Rosov)

REFLEX — Первый раз (Акустическая версия) [Line-up: I. Nelson, А. Torganova, G. Rosov]

REFLEX — Я тебя всегда буду ждать (Line-up: I. Nelson, А. Torganova, G. Rosov)

REFLEX — Я тебя всегда буду ждать (Remix) [Line-up: I. Nelson, А. Torganova, G. Rosov]

REFLEX — album «Я тебя всегда буду ждать» (Line-up: I. Nelson, А. Torganova, G. Rosov)

REFLEX — album «Это любовь!!!» (Line-up: I. Nelson, А. Torganova, G. Rosov)

Litsey — Ты станешь взрослой

Sveta — Вернись, моя любовь!

Malta — Без тебя

J-J Power — С тобой

J-J Power — Глупостей не делай

2003

REFLEX — Мне трудно говорить (Line-up: I. Nelson, А. Torganova, G. Rosov)

REFLEX — I Can't Live Without You (Line-up: I. Nelson, А. Torganova, G. Rosov)

REFLEX — Падали звезды (Line-up: I. Nelson, А. Torganova, G. Rosov)

REFLEX — Может быть, показалось (Line-up: I. Nelson, А. Torganova, G. Rosov)

REFLEX — Это Новый год (Line-up: I. Nelson, А. Torganova, G. Rosov)

REFLEX — Non-Stop (Line-up: I. Nelson, А. Torganova, G. Rosov)

REFLEX — Non-Stop (English Version) [Line-up: I. Nelson, А. Torganova, G. Rosov]

REFLEX — album «Non Stop» (Line-up: I. Nelson, А. Torganova, G. Rosov)

Саша Project — album «Очень нужен ты»

S17 — альбом «Я буду с тобой»

Litsey — Как ты о нем мечтала

Alyona Apina — Здравствуй, малыш

2004

REFLEX — Люблю (Line-up: I. Nelson, А. Torganova, G. Rosov)

REFLEX — I Lose My Mind (English version ofLosing my mind «Сойти с ума») [Line-up: I. Nelson, А. Torganova, G. Rosov]

Irina Saltykova — Бегу за тобой

Sveta — Где найти любовь?

Ekaterina Guseva — Навсегда

2005

REFLEX — collection «Лирика "Люблю"...» [Line-up: I. Nelson, А. Torganova, G. Rosov]

REFLEX — Танцы (Line-up: I. Nelson, А. Torganova, G. Rosov)

REFLEX — Я разбила небо (Line-up: I. Nelson, А. Torganova, G. Rosov)

REFLEX — Жесткое диско (Line-up: I. Nelson, А. Torganova, G. Rosov)

REFLEX — Научи любить (Line-up: I. Nelson, А. Torganova, G. Rosov)

REFLEX — Половинка (Line-up: I. Nelson, А. Torganova, G. Rosov)

REFLEX — альбом «Пульс» (Line-up: I. Nelson, А. Torganova, G. Rosov)

Alyona Sviridova — Всё потому что ты

Natalia Gulkina — Я не могу без тебя

2006

REFLEX — альбом «Гарем» (Line-up: I. Nelson, А. Torganova, G. Rosov, J. Malahova)

Non-Stop — Я на все согласна

Non-Stop — Под запретом

Non-Stop — Электронная любовь

2007

Irina Saltykova — До тебя

Slava — В небо

Non-Stop — Где заблудилась любовь

2008

REFLEX — Шанель (Line-up: A. Torganova, J. Malakhova, A. Studenikina)

REFLEX — album Blondes 126 (A. Torganova, J. Malakhova, A. Studenikina)

2009

REFLEX — Просто любить (Line-up: A. Torganova, J. Malakhova)

REFLEX — Девочка-ветер (Line-up: A. Torganova, J. Malakhova, Е. Maksimova)

REFLEX — Мой любимый город (Line-up: A. Torganova, J. Malakhova, E. Maksimova)

Irina Nelson — Рассвет

Irina Nelson — Sunrise

2010

REFLEX & Ирина Нельсон — Се ля ви (Line-up: A. Torganova, J. Malakhova, E. Maksimova, I. Nelson)

REFLEX — Белая метелица (Line-up: A. Torganova, Zh. Malakhova, E. Maksimova)

2011

REFLEX — Адреналин (Line-up: A. Torganova, J. Malakhova, A. Baston)

Irina Nelson — album «Sun Generation»

Irina Nelson — Теплое солнце

2012

Irina Nelson — album «Теплое солнце»

REFLEX — Я буду небом твоим (Line-up: I. Nelson, A. Torganova)

REFLEX — Потому что не было тебя (Version 2012) [Line-up: I. Nelson, A. Torganova]

REFLEX — Если небо не за нас (Version 2012) [Line-up: I. Nelson, A. Torganova]

REFLEX — Первый раз (Version 2012) [Line-up: I. Nelson, A. Torganova]

REFLEX — Мне трудно говорить (Version 2012) [Line-up: I. Nelson, A. Torganova]

2013

REFLEX feat. Elvira T — Ангел (Line-up: I. Nelson, A. Torganova)

REFLEX — Ангел (Line-up: I. Nelson, A. Torganova)

REFLEX — Лето на окна (Line-up: I. Nelson, A. Torganova)

2014

REFLEX — Воспоминания о будущем (Line-up: I. Nelson, A. Torganova)

REFLEX — Прикосновения (Line-up: I. Nelson, A. Torganova)

REFLEX — album «Воспоминания о будущем» (Line-up: I. Nelson, A. Torganova)

Irina Nelson feat. Denis Klyaver — Я за тебя молюсь

2015

REFLEX — Художник (Line-up: I. Nelson)

REFLEX — Взрослые девочки (Line-up: I. Nelson, A. Torganova)

REFLEX — album «Взрослые девочки» (Line-up: I. Nelson, A. Torganova)

Natalia Grozovskaya — Мой дорогой

2016

REFLEX — Говори со мной (Line-up: I. Nelson)

REFLEX — Солнце (Line-up: I. Nelson)

REFLEX — album «Взрослые девочки Deluxe» (Line-up: I. Nelson)

Alisher — Романтик

Talitha (Алиса Салтыкова) — Criminal

2017

VIVITI — My Sunny My Funny

VIVITI — Девочка Play

REFLEX — С Новым годом! (Line-up: I. Nelson)

REFLEX — Не дай ему уйти (Line-up: I. Nelson)

2018

VIVITI — Где-то

REFLEX — Зима (Version 2018) [Line-up: I. Nelson]

2019

REFLEX — Встречай новый день (Version 2019) [Line-up: I. Nelson]

REFLEX — album «Гарем 2» (Line-up: I. Nelson)

REFLEX — Давай, танцуй (Line-up: I. Nelson)

REFLEX — Дым и танцы (Line-up: I. Nelson)

Savage feat. REFLEX — Only You (Cover Version) [Line-up: I. Nelson]

2020

REFLEX — Сеть (Line-up: I. Nelson)

REFLEX — Ноябрь (Line-up: I. Nelson)

REFLEX feat. Bittuev — Танцы (Version 2020) [Line-up: I. Nelson]

Burito — Потерянный рай (Tribute Vyacheslav Tyurin)

2021

Alina Tyurina — Любовь океанами

Julia Godunova feat. REFLEX — Танцы

Жгучие & Total/Cherkunova — По улицам Питера

REFLEX — Новая модель (Cover t.A.T.u.) [Line-up: I. Nelson]

VIVITI — Завтра не наступит никогда

2022

Баюн & Богдан feat. REFLEX — Потерянный рай

KALASOVA — Навсегда

NECHAEV feat. REFLEX — Первый раз

SOFI' AM — Была
