= Kastra (musical artist) =

American DJ and music producer

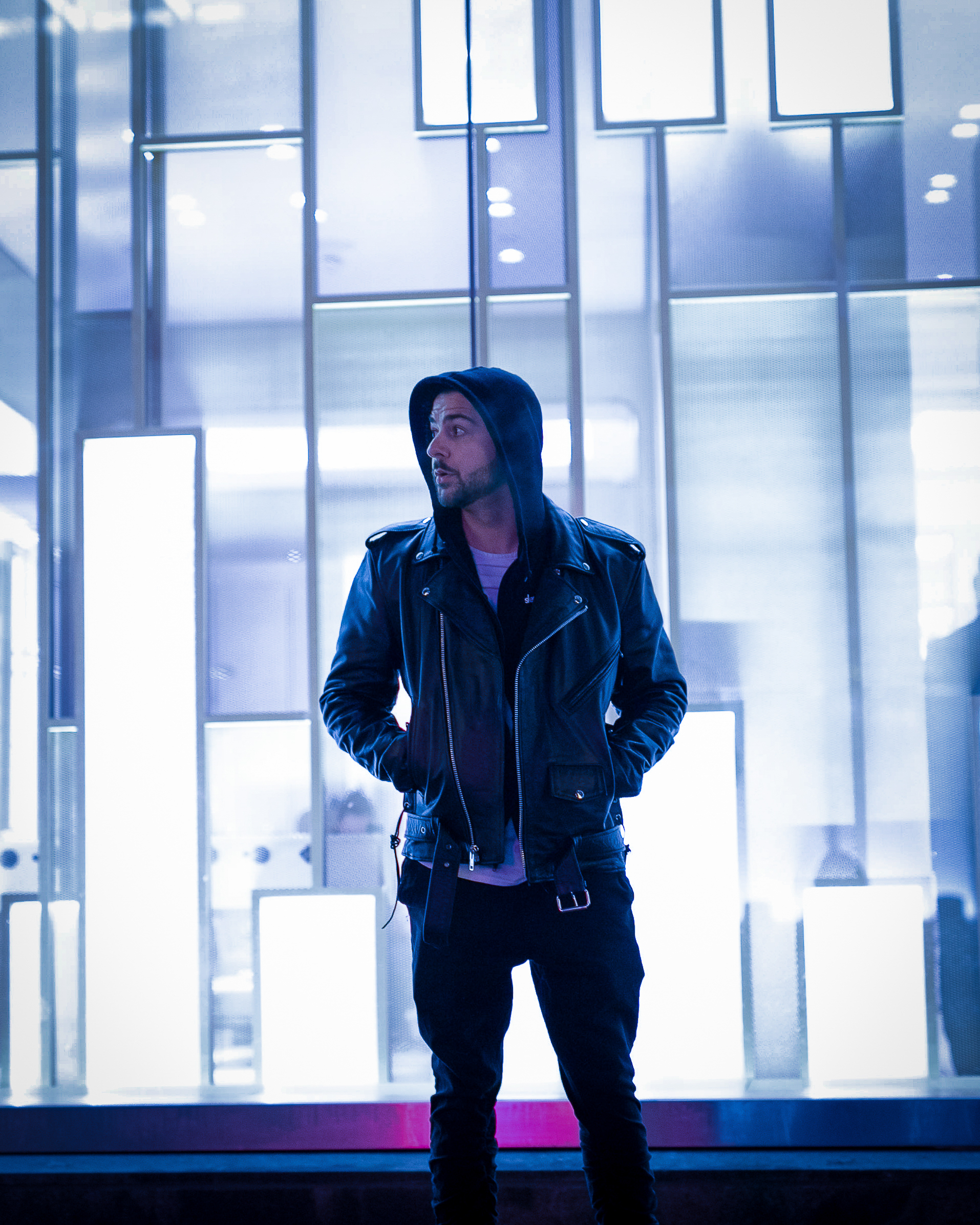

Background information
- Birth name: Ray Decker
- Origin: Asbury Park, New Jersey
- Genres: EDM; Progressive house; Future house
- Occupation(s): DJ, music producer
- Years active: 2012–present
- Labels: Ultra Music; AFTR: HRS; Armada Music; Enhanced Music; Musical Freedom; Hussle Recordings
- Website: www.kastramusic.com

Ray Decker, known professionally as Kastra, is an American DJ, music producer and songwriter from New Jersey. He is known for his singles "Fool For You", "U & Me" and "Wassup (Listen to the Horns)". He is also known for his official remixes of Ava Max and 3lau, Sultan + Shepard, and Two Friends.

== Early life ==
Ray Decker was born in Neptune, New Jersey. He attended Quinnipiac University where he received his Bachelor's in marketing as well as his MBA. Growing up, he played the electric guitar in various local bands, and was influenced by the hard rock and heavy metal scene. In an interview with Salacious Sound, he credited those early years as an important part of his sound and development. During a trip to Australia while in college, he was exposed to electronic music and nightclub culture. Upon returning, he began focusing on electronic music production rather than playing guitar, because it allowed him to "make an entire song by [himself]".

== Musical career ==
=== 2011–2014: Career beginnings ===
Ray Decker began producing mashups and bootleg remixes under the name Kastra in 2011. Many of his early mashups charted in the top 5 on Hype Machine. and were also uploaded to popular YouTube channels such as Proximity. Kastra's first original releases were in 2012 when he released "Hold A Light" and "Warning" on Antiblaze Records. In 2014, he released the single "Dolla Bilz" on the Disco Fries' Liftoff Recordings.

=== 2015–2016: Singles ===
In 2015, Electric Family named Kastra one of the "10 Most Underrated Acts You Need To Know for 2015". He released a string of Melbourne bounce tracks beginning with "Placebo" on Hussle Recordings as well as "Twilight Zone" featuring Fatman Scoop. "Placebo" was included in Ministry of Sound Australia 2015 Clubbers Guide compilation. That year, he collaborated with DJ BL3ND on "Boomshakalaka".

=== 2017–present: Style changes and international prominence ===
In 2017, Kastra started to transition to more of a commercial sound and began incorporating more future house and progressive house elements into his music. He released "Feel Alright" with Buzzmeisters on Bourne Recordings, as well as "About Us" with Landis on Aftercluv Dance Lab. The following year he released numerous tracks including "Fool Me Twice", and "Supreme" which was praised by Karlie Powell ofYourEDM for its balance of "softer tones" and layered melodies.

Kastra collaborated with Timmy Trumpet and Chuck Roberts on the song "Wassup (Listen to the Horns)", released by TMRW Music on January 11, 2019. Kat Bein of Billboard praised the song's production and disco-house influences, calling it "a tropical-flavored explosion, a refreshing vacation for your ears". The song reached No. 1 on Radio Metro in Australia.

In June 2019, Kastra and Andy Tongren collaborated with Lena Leon on her debut single "Walls". Later that year, he released "U & Me", a collaboration with twoDB and Evangelia on Strange Fruit Records. The song charted at No. 8 on Billboard's Dance/Mix Show Airplay, making it Kastra's first Top 10 single.

He released "Issues", a collaboration with Modern Machines and Bianca Linta, in November 2019. The song was released on Tiësto’s Musical Freedom/AFTR:HRS label and was met with praise from DJ Times, and Dancing Astronaut. Kastra's remix of "All Your Love" by Bonka peaked at No. 5 on the ARIA Charts in 2020.

In February 2020, Kastra released the single "Around Me" with Blue Ivy and RUNAGROUND on Tritonal's Enhanced Music. He also launched his monthly radio show Niteshift Radio.

He produced the official remix for Ava Max's single "My Head & My Heart", released on November 19, 2020.

Kastra's cover of Fergie's "Glamorous" reached No. 16 on the Billboard's Dance/Mix Show charts in December 2020, making it his second Top 20 single in the US.

In late 2020, Kastra signed with Ultra Music and in early 2021 released his label debut, "Fool For You". The single reached No. 24 on the Dance/Mix Show Airplay charts.

== Discography ==
=== Singles ===
Year	Title	Peak chart positions	Album
Year	Title	US	Album
2021	"Fool For You"	40	Non-album singles
2020	"Savage" ft. TRIVD	–	Non-album singles
2020	"Glamorous (Fergie Cover)"	16	Non-album singles
2020	"Circles" ft. Alex Byrne	–	Non-album singles
2020	"Around Me" ft. RUNAGROUND & Blue Ivy	–	Non-album singles
2019	"Issues" ft. Modern Machines & Bianca Linta	–	Non-album singles
2019	"You Don’t Know Me" ft. MIMO & Raquel Castro	–	Non-album singles
2019	"Walls" (Lena Leon ft. Andy Tongren)	–	Non-album singles
2019	"U & Me" (TwoDB ft. Evangelia)	8	Non-album singles
2019	"Take Over Control" ft. Vinny Vibe (Afrojack Cover)	–	Non-album singles
2019	"Love Like This" ft. SM1LO & Katja Glieson	–	Non-album singles
2019	"Kill My Vibe" ft. Marat Leon	–	Non-album singles
2019	"Flexin" ft. DJ ZA & Chris Leed	–	Non-album singles
2019	"Wassup (Listen to the Horns)" (Timmy Trumpet)	–	Non-album singles
2018	"Tell Me You Need Me" ft. Hannah Sumner	–	Non-album singles
2018	"Fool Me Twice" ft. Zach Matari & Dramos	–	Non-album singles
2018	"Supreme" ft. Kid Phil	–	Supreme (Remixes)
2018	"Renegade" ft. Lauren Mayhew	–	Non-album singles
2018	"Underdog" (Freshcobar)	–	Non-album singles
2017	"Not Afraid" (Ft. Bodhi Jones)	–	Non-album singles
2017	"Jack 2k17" (WICKD)	–	Non-album singles
2017	"Feel Alright" (Buzzmeisters ft. Jacob Lee)	–	Non-album singles
2017	"About Us" (Landis, ft. Nisha)	–	Non-album singles
2017	"So Good" ft. Damien Anthony and Kalide	–	Non-album singles
2017	"Everything You Want"	–	Non-album singles
2016	"Who We Are" ft. Nicole Medoro	–	Non-album singles
2016	"Switch It Up"	–	Non-album singles
2016	"Aight!"	–	Non-album singles
2016	"Lovin’ This"	–	Non-album singles
2016	"Kangaroo" ft. Buzzmeisters	–	Non-album singles
2016	"Stay Weird" ft. DNNYD	–	Non-album singles
2015	"Boomshakalaka" ft. DJ BL3ND	–	Non-album singles
2015	"#BOUNCEHEAD" ft. Peep This	–	Non-album singles
2015	"Tooty" ft. Big Ali and DJ Prime	–	Non-album singles
2015	"Twilight Zone" ft. Fatman Scoop and Tall Boys	–	Non-album singles
2015	"Placebo"	–	Non-album singles
2014	"Jiggle It"	–	Non-album singles
2014	"Knockout" ft. Pkeys	–	Non-album singles
2014	"Dolla Billz"	–	Non-album singles
2014	"Move Ur Feet"	–	Non-album singles
2012	"Warning" ft. Xristo & Michelle Martinez	–	Non-album singles
2012	"Hold A Light" ft. Chris Sorbello	–	Non-album singles

=== Remixes ===
Year	Original artist(s)	Peak chart positions	Year	Album
Year	Original artist(s)	AUS	Year	Album
"My Head & My Heart (Kastra Remix)"	Ava Max	–	2020	Heaven & Hell
"Stay the Night"	GT_Ofice ft. xoxomyah	–	2020	Non-album singles
"Teach Me (Kastra & twoDB Remix)"	Joe Bermudez	–	2020	Non-album singles
"Like Nobody (Kastra Remix)"	Vavo	–	2020	Non-album singles
"Younger (Kastra Remix)"	DLMT	–	2020	Non-album singles
"Say (Kastra Remix)"	Asher Postman, Disero, & Annelisa Franklin	–	2019	Non-album singles
"All Your Love (Kastra Remix)"	Bonka	5	2019	Non-album singles
"Sayonara (Kastra Remix)"	BEAUZ	–	2019	Non-album singles
"Dollar Menu (Kastra Remix)"	Two Friends	–	2019	Non-album singles
"We Found Love (Zack Martino & Kastra Remix)"	Sultan & Shepard & Showtek	–	2019	Echoes of Life: Day
"Mood (Kastra Remix)"	Zack Martino	–	2019	Non-album singles
"Better With You (Kastra & twoDB Remix)"	3lau & Justin Caruso	–	2019	Non-album singles
"If You Walk Away (Kastra Remix)"	The Rhetoriks	–	2018	If You Walk Away (The Remix Album)
"All They Wanna Be (Kastra Remix)"	Madison Mars	–	2018	Non-album singles
"Deja Vu (Kastra & Damien Anthony Remix)"	Timmy Trumpet & Savage	–	2018	Non-album singles
"Skitzo (Kastra Remix)"	Joe Bermudez	–	2017	New Ginza At Night
"Baby It’s You (Kastra Remix)"	Gianna Salvato	–	2015	Non-album singles
"Front 2tha Back (Kastra Remix)"	Tommie Sunshine & GLOWINTHEDARK	–	2015	Non-album singles
"Bottles Up (Exodus & Kastra Remix)"	Vandalism & Jason Risk	–	2015	Non-album singles
"808's In The Night (Tommie Sunshine & Kastra Remix)"	Eric Sharp	–	2014	Non-album singles
