= Denine =

Singer-songwriter

Denine Latanzo
- Also known as: Denine; Del Sol
- Genres: Freestyle; House
- Years active: 1991–present
- Labels: Metropolitan; Viper; Tazmania; Tripodi; 418 Music

Denine Latanzo, known mononymously as Denine, is an American singer of Freestyle music, in addition to being a songwriter. Denine is best remembered for her song "All Cried Out" (Cover of Lisa Lisa & Cult Jam), which reached #72 on the Billboard Hot 100. "I Remember You", the singer's second single, reached No. 16 on the Bubbling Under Hot 100 Singles chart (the virtual equivalent to position 116 in the Billboard Hot 100).

== History ==
Denine started doing background for the project T.P.E., in the song "Then Came You," which reached position 91 on the Billboard Hot 100. She released further singles in 1993, including "I Remember You" and "Tearshed", a cover of MKG's "Tear Shed" from 1988. In 1994, she reissued the single 1991, and in October 1994 she released her debut album, called To Be Continued ... which included a cover of Lisa Lisa & Cult Jam's "All Cried Out" . This version reached position 72 on the billboard.

In 1996, Denine released the single "Love of a Lifetime", with the participation of Collage. In 1998 she released the single "I Believe", shortly after she stopped singing to devote more time to her family. She returned in 2011 with the song "What Happened to Love".

== Discography ==
=== Studio albums ===
Year	Album details
1994	To Be Continued...: Released: October 1994; Label: Viper / Metropolitan
