= Can't We Try =

1987 duet between Dan Hill and Vonda Shepard

Single by Dan Hill and Vonda Shepard

from the album Dan Hill
- B-side: "Pleasure Centre"
- Released: June 1987
- Genre: Pop
- Length: 4:02
- Label: Columbia
- Songwriters: Beverly Chapin Hill, Dan Hill
- Producers: Hank Medress, John Capek

Dan Hill singles chronology
"You Pulled Me Through" (1984)	"Can't We Try" (1987)	"Never Thought (That I Could Love)" (1987)

"Can't We Try" is a 1987 duet performed by Dan Hill and Vonda Shepard. The ballad was Billboard's No.1 Adult Contemporary Song of the Year for 1987, even though it only reached No.2 on the weekly charts.

"Can't We Try" was released as a single from Dan Hill's 1987 self-titled album. The song reached No.6 on the Billboard Hot 100 and also on Cash Box, making it Dan Hill's second-biggest hit behind "Sometimes When We Touch", which hit No. 3 back in 1978, and was Vonda Shepard's only Top 10 Pop hit.

It also reached No. 2 for three weeks on the Billboard Adult Contemporary chart (behind "I Wanna Dance with Somebody" by Whitney Houston and "Moonlighting" by Al Jarreau). In Canada, the song reached No.14.

== Track listing ==
7" single

No.	Title	Length
1.	"Can't We Try" (with Vonda Shepard)	4:02
2.	"Pleasure Centre"	3:46

== Chart positions ==
Chart (1987)	Peak position
Australia (Kent Music Report)	41
Canada RPM Adult Contemporary	2
Canada RPM Top 100 Singles	14
Dutch Top 40	36
US Adult Contemporary	2
US Billboard Hot 100	6

=== Year-end charts ===
Chart (1987)	Position
Canada RPM Top 100 Singles of '87	83
US Billboard Hot 100	63

== Rockell and Collage version ==
"Can't We Try"

Single by Rockell

from the album What Are You Lookin' At?
- Released: May 15, 1998
- Genre: Freestyle
- Length: 4:03
- Label: Robbins Entertainment
- Songwriters: Beverly Chapin Hill, Dan Hill
- Producers: Joe Tucci, Billy Brown

Rockell singles chronology
"In a Dream" (1997)	"Can't We Try" (1998)	"When I'm Gone" (1999)

In 1998, Rockell covered the song as a duet with Collage. It was her third single from her 1998 debut album, What Are You Lookin' At? and third single overall. This song reached No. 59 on the Billboard Hot 100 as well as No. 11 on the Hot Dance Music/Maxi-Singles Sales chart.

=== Track listing ===
CD single

No.	Title	Length
1.	"Can't We Try" (Radio Version)	4:00
2.	"Can't We Try" (The Slow Jam)	3:52

Promo CD single

No.	Title	Length
1.	"Can't We Try" (Radio Version)	4:00
2.	"Can't We Try" (The Slow Jam)	3:52
3.	"Can't We Try" (Acapella)	4:02

US Remixes CD single

No.	Title	Length
1.	"Can't We Try" (Lenny B Mix-Radio Version)	4:13
2.	"Can't We Try" (Mr. Mig Mix)	4:44
3.	"Can't We Try" (Lenny B Club Mix)	6:03
4.	"Can't We Try" (Pablo's Main Room Remix)	7:40
5.	"Can't We Try" (Original Radio Version)	4:03

=== Chart positions ===
Chart	Peak position
US Billboard Hot 100	59
US Hot Dance Music/Maxi-Singles Sales	11

== In popular culture ==
The original Dan Hill version from 1987 was used for the Kelly and Jeffrey characters on the American soap opera Santa Barbara. In 1988, Hong Kong singer Gina Lam and Andy Hui covered this song in Cantonese.
