= Then Came You =

Then Came You may refer to:

- Then Came You (2018 film), an American romantic comedy-drama starring Asa Butterfield and Maisie Williams
- Then Came You (2020 film), an American romantic comedy starring Craig Ferguson and Kathie Lee Gifford
- Then Came You (TV series), a 2000 American sitcom
- Then Came You, the working title of the 1983 TV series Webster
- "Then Came You" (Dionne Warwick and the Spinners song) (1974)
- Then Came You (album), a 1975 album by Dionne Warwick
- "Then Came You" (T.P.E. song) (1991)
