= When I'm Gone (Albert Hammond song) =

1981 song

Single by Albert Hammond

from the album Your World and My World
- Released: 1981
- Genre: Soft rock
- Length: 4:22
- Label: CBS
- Songwriter(s): A. Hammond, H. Payne

"When I'm Gone" is a 1981 single by English soft rock musician Albert Hammond, taken from his 1981 album, Your World and My World. It charted in Germany at No. 50, Switzerland at No. 12, and in South Africa at No. 7.

== Rockell version ==
"When I'm Gone"

Single by Rockell

from the album What Are You Lookin' At?
- Released: January 8, 1999
- Genre: Dance
- Length: 4:12
- Label: Robbins Entertainment
- Songwriter(s): A. Hammond, H. Payne

Rockell singles chronology
"Can't We Try" (1998)	"When I'm Gone" (1999)	"The Dance" (2000)

"When I'm Gone" was covered by freestyle singer Rockell in 1999, as her fourth overall single and last single off her 1998 debut album, What Are You Lookin' At?.

=== Lyrics and background ===
The meaning of the song is about when she's gone, will the guy miss her as she misses him. She can't stop thinking of him and wants to reconcile with him. She wanted to be apart at first but hopes love will reunite them. The beat of the song is cheery and uptempo.

=== Track listing ===
US CD single

No.	Title	Length
1.	"When I'm Gone" (radio version)	4:12
2.	"When I'm Gone" (Slammin' Sam's Wild Wesside remix-radio version)	3:38
3.	"When I'm Gone" (Carlos Berrios mix-radio version)	4:20
4.	"When I'm Gone" (Slammin' Sam's Wild Wesside remix)	6:01
5.	"When I'm Gone" (Carlos Berrios mix)	6:59

=== Chart positions ===
Chart	Peak position
Hot Dance Music/Maxi-Singles Sales	21
