= L.O.V.E. (Rockell song) =

Single by Rockell
- Released: 2005
- Genre: Freestyle, Dance
- Length: 3:39
- Songwriter(s): Mickey Bono, Hurley Constantine
- Producer(s): Mickey Bono

Rockell singles chronology
"Tears" (2002)	"L.O.V.E." (2005)	"Playin' My Love" (2007)

"L.O.V.E." is the eighth single overall by American freestyle recording artist Rockell. It was her return to the music scene after a three-year break. It's also the first single by Rockell that is a non-album single. It became a modest Hot Dance Music/Club Play chart hit. It also received some dance radio airplay.

== Lyrics and background ==
The meaning of the song is that falling in love can lead to pain and heartbreak. If she doesn't stay away from love, it's gonna end up hurting her. From her past, she does not want it to happen again. A sample from the lyrics go "I don't want to love again, I can't let my heart back in." The producer of this single was Mickey Bono. The beat of the most played "Mickey Bono Radio Edit" is soft, dance-able and her vocals echo as she spells out L.O.V.E.

== Track listing ==
US CD Single

No.	Title	Length
1.	"L.O.V.E." (Mickey Bono Radio Edit)	3:39
2.	"L.O.V.E." (Yinon Yahel Remix)	7:08
