= In a Dream (song) =

1997 single by Rockell

Single by Rockell

from the album What Are You Lookin' At?
- Released: May 20, 1997
- Genre: Freestyle, dance
- Length: 4:00
- Label: Robbins Entertainment
- Songwriter(s): Randy Taylor-Weber, Alexandra E Forbes & Michael James Zager
- Producer(s): Joe Tucci, Billy Brown

Rockell singles chronology
"I Fell in Love" (1996)	"In a Dream" (1997)	"Can't We Try" (1998)

"In a Dream" is the second single from Rockell's first album, What Are You Lookin' At? (1998). A music video has never been filmed for the single. "In a Dream" peaked at number 72 on the Billboard Hot 100.

In 2023, Orlando based DJ Acraze remixed the song with new vocals by Aviella.

== Track listings ==
US CD single

No.	Title	Length
1.	"In a Dream" (freestyle mix)	4:00
2.	"In a Dream" (funky mix)	4:45
3.	"I Fell in Love" (Lenny B's freestyle radio mix)	4:05
4.	"I Fell in Love" (Lenny B's freestyle club mix)	5:16

US 12" single
No.	Title	Length
1.	"In a Dream" (freestyle mix)	4:00
2.	"In a Dream" (funky mix)	4:45
3.	"I Fell in Love" (Lenny B's freestyle club mix)	5:16
4.	"In a Dream" (freestyle instrumental)	4:00

US cassette single
No.	Title	Length
1.	"In a Dream" (freestyle mix)	4:00
2.	"In a Dream" (funky mix)	4:45

Germany maxi-single
No.	Title	Length
1.	"In a Dream" (Snapshot mix)	3:17
2.	"In a Dream" (freestyle mix)	4:00
3.	"In a Dream" (Green Battle)	5:31
4.	"In a Dream" (funky mix)	4:45
5.	"In a Dream" (Lions Club extended mix)	5:42

== Charts ==
Chart	Peak Position
Canadian Singles Chart	6
US Billboard Hot 100	72
US Hot Dance Music/Maxi-Singles Sales	13
