= The First Chapter =

The First Chapter or The 1st Chapter may refer to:

- The First Chapter (The Mission album), 1987 and 2007
- The First Chapter (Nastyboy Klick album), 1997
- The First Chapter (EP), 2004 EP, by Dream Evil
- The First Chapter (video album), 1985, video equivalent of The Age of Consent album by Bronski Beat
- The 1st Chapter (album), 2005, by Circus Maximus

== See also ==
- Chapter One (disambiguation)
