= I Still Feel =

Studio album by Templeton Thompson
- Released: May 13, 2004
- Genre: Country, Horse Country, Contemporary Country, Acoustic Country
- Length: 38:07
- Label: Reve Records/Connected at the Hit Productions
- Producer: Sam Gay

Templeton Thompson chronology
I Remember You (2003)	I Still Feel (2004)	Girls & Horses (2006)

I Still Feel is the second studio album from Templeton Thompson. The album was released on May 13, 2004 via Reve Records/Connected at the Hit Productions.

The album features eleven tracks including the single, "If I Didn't Need The Money" which was issued to Texas Radio. The song "Settle Down Cinderella" is featured in the movie, Doctor Dolittle 3.

== Background ==
The album was led by the single, "If I Didn't Need The Money." The song was issued to Texas radio to accompany the release of I Still Feel. The single went on to peak in the top ten on the Texas music chart.

Templeton has included a full description of how the song came to be, on her official website. Thompson says the song came about after being asked to record a "scratch" vocal for a major label artist. According to Thompson, the song was written based on the session experience that day.

"Settle Down Cinderella" is included on the 2006 20th century Fox Home Entertainment film Doctor Dolittle 3 soundtrack.

== Reception ==
Gian F of "The Music Muse" writes the album, "can be listened to in its entirety without skipping one track." He goes on to write, "[it is the] subtle and powerful emotional expression which she emotes in "The Edge of the Spotlight," and "I'll Know," that punctuates the immensity of her talents."

== Track listing ==
	Song title	Writers	Length
1	"I Still Feel"		2:53
2	"Like A Cat"		3:26
3	"If I Didn't Need The Money"	Templeton, Thompson, Sam Gay, Porter Howell	2:51
4	"I Dream In Blue"		3:13
5	"Edge Of The Spotlight"		3:48
6	"I Stood My Ground"		4:00
7	"I'll Know"	Thompson, Cliff Goldmacher	2:40
8	"A Horse That Can Fly"		4:10
9	"How's Texas Treating You"		3:38
10	"Settle Down Cinderella"		3:27
11	"Real Love"		5:23
