= T.P.E. =

Freestyle music group

T.P.E., also known as The Philadelphia Experiment was a project of dance-pop and freestyle music formed in 1991 by music producer Adam Marano, who also was the only member of the project. It was one of the first projects created by Adam Marano before creating what would become his most famous project, the Collage. T.P.E. released four singles; the most popular of them being the song "Then Came You", which reached No. 91 on the Billboard Hot 100 in 1991.

The project ended its activities in 1994, when they released their last single, "Dance with Me".

== Discography ==
=== Studio album ===
Year	Album details
1992	T.P.E. Featuring Adam Marano: Released: 1992; Label: Micmac Records

=== Singles ===
Year	Single	Positions	Album
Year	Single	Billboard Hot 100	Album
1991	"Then Came You	91	T.P.E. Featuring Adam Marano
1992	"Forever And A Day"	-	T.P.E. Featuring Adam Marano
1993	"Sex U Down"	-	T.P.E. Featuring Adam Marano
1994	"Dance With Me"	-	T.P.E. Featuring Adam Marano
