= Non Stop (Reflex album) =

Studio album by Reflex
- Released: 2 December 2003
- Recorded: 2003
- Genre: Pop, electronics, synth-pop
- Length: 57 min.
- Label: Gramophone Records
- Producer: Vyacheslav Tyurin

Reflex chronology
This is Love (2003)	Non Stop (2003)	Lyrics. I Love (2005)

Non Stop is the fifth studio album by Russian pop band Reflex.

== Critical reception ==
According to the reviewer of the agency InterMedia gave the album a positive assessment. The reviewer called the songs It's Hard for Me to Speak, The Stars Fell, Because You Didn't Exist, and Acka Raga. By the hits of the album. According to him, most of the other songs are also not bad in their own way, but they need to get used to, listen to, and radio figures usually prefer to grab what lies on the surface.

== Track listing ==
1. Non Stop – 3:43
2. Может быть показалось – 3:50 (May Be Seemed)
3. Мне трудно говорить – 3:34 (It's Hard for Me to Speak)
4. Падали звёзды – 3:38 (The Stars Fell)
5. Зима – 3:42 (Winter)
6. Acka Raga – 3:37
7. Город плачет – 4:00 (City Crying)
8. Дельфин – 3:53 (Dolphin)
9. Потому что не было тебя – 3:17 (Because You Didn't Exist (Acoustic Version)
10. Я буду помнить – 4:17 (I Will Remember)
11. Это Новый год! – 3:46 (It is a New Year!)
12. D.I.S.C.O. 2 – 3:58 feat. DJ Silver
13. Мне трудно говорить – 3:55 (It's Hard for Me to Speak) (Remix)
14. Acka Raga (Remix) – 3:30
15. Потому что не было тебя – 5:28 (DJ Orl vs. Funkmaster Club Mix)

== Personnel ==
- Irene Nelson — vocals, backing vocals
- Alyona Torganova — backing vocals
- Grigory Rozov (DJ Silver) — rap
- Anton Tyurin — guitar, arrangement
- Andrey Slonchinsky — guitar, arrangement
- Viacheslav Tyurin — arrangement, production
- Anatoly Betskov — arrangement
