= Instant Pleasure (album) =

Studio album by Rockell
- Released: October 10, 2000
- Genre: Electronic, Dance
- Label: Robbins Entertainment
- Producer: Tony Moran, Adam Marano, Hex Hector, Dezrok, Lea Reis, Moe Doe, Carlos Berrios, Giuseppe D.

Rockell studio album chronology
What Are You Lookin' At? (1998)	Instant Pleasure (2000)

Singles from Instant Pleasure
- 1. "The Dance" Released: August 1, 2000; 2. "What U Did 2 Me" Released: November 14, 2000; 3. "Tears" Released: February 20, 2001

Professional ratings
Review scores
Source	Rating
Allmusic	link

Instant Pleasure is Rockell's second album, released on October 10, 2000, on Robbins Entertainment. It is more pop oriented than her debut and was mostly produced by Tony Moran and Hex Hector. The album features the hit singles "What U Did 2 Me", "Tears" and "The Dance".

== Track listing ==
No.	Title	Length
1.	"What U Did 2 Me"	3:42
2.	"If I'm Ever Lonely"	4:23
3.	"The Dance"	4:04
4.	"If You Don't See"	3:49
5.	"Tears"	4:04
6.	"Are You Ready for My Love"	3:40
7.	"Instant Pleasure"	4:33
8.	"Waiting"	3:58
9.	"First Kiss"	3:43
10.	"We Just Disagree"	3:15
11.	"One Kiss"	3:11
12.	"Say You'll Be Mine"	5:07

== Chart positions ==
Singles - Billboard (North America)

Year	Single	Chart	Position
2001	"What U Did 2 Me"	Hot Dance Music/Maxi-Singles Sales	27
2002	"Tears"	Hot Dance Music/Maxi-Singles Sales	16
