= Girls & Horses =

Studio album by Templeton Thompson
- Released: November 7, 2006
- Genre: Horse Country, Acoustic Country
- Length: 44:13
- Label: Reve Records/Connected At The Hit Productions
- Producer: Sam Gay

Templeton Thompson chronology
I Still Feel (2004)	Girls & Horses (2006)	Life On Planet Cowgirl (2009)

Girls & Horses is the third studio album by independent Nashville singer-songwriter, Templeton Thompson. The album was released on November 7, 2006, via Reve Records/Connected At The Hit Productions. Like Thompson's two previous albums, Girls & Horses was also produced by Sam Gay.

== Background ==
The album was released in the fall of 2006. The album which includes ten songs, shows much of Thompson's passion for horses. Each song identifies or relates to the relationship formed between humans and their horses. Girls & Horses has been named Thompson's most personal record to date. Prior to the release of the album, a promotional video clip was released to accompany the street release. A music video accompanied the title track's release as a single. The video features Thompson riding with her own horse with 'flashbacks' of a child who has carried a passion for horses from a young age, reflective of Thompson's own childhood.

== Critical reception ==
Journalist, "Lead Mare" of GirlsHorseClub.com praises Thompson's work on the album stating, " As the writer or co-writer of all but one of the tunes in this collection, she sings the *feeling* behind each song. Every track tells her story." Sue Kottwitz of the Talking Dogs blog exclaims, "Girls and Horses displays Templeton's true love for equine and speaks to the soul of every woman who ever loved a horse."

== Track listing ==
	Song title	Writers	Length
1	"Girls & Horses"	Templeton Thompson	3:05
2	"Guardian Angel"	Thompson, Sam Gay, Porter Howell	3:53
3	"Cowgirl Creed"	Thompson, Gay	3:13
4	"Just Stay Crazy"	Gay, Thompson, Howell	3:09
5	"Ride Before It Rains"	Thompson, Gay	3:48
6	"She Remembers Ridin'"	Thompson, Gay	5:22
7	"Shouldn't We All"	Thompson, Gay, Howell	3:26
8	"Beautiful Day" (styled as "Beauty~full Day")	Thompson, Gay	3:29
9	"Tall In The Saddle"	John Tirro, Lisa Aschmann	4:38
10	"Wake Up Grateful"^{+}	Thompson, Gay	9:28

^{+}"Wake Up Grateful" contains hidden bonus track.
