= T.P.E. Featuring Adam Marano =

Studio album by T.P.E.
- Released: 1992
- Genre: Dance-pop, freestyle
- Label: Micmac
- Producer: Adam Marano

T.P.E. Featuring Adam Marano is the debut album of the dance-pop and freestyle project T.P.E. created by music producer Adam Marano. The album was released in 1992 by Micmac Records. Of the four singles released from the album, the only one to succeed was "Then Came You", which reached No. 91 on the Billboard Hot 100 in 1991. Other singles of this album were "Forever and a Day", released in 1992, "Sex U Down", released in 1993 and "Dance with Me", released in 1994. The album also contains the participation of freestyle singers that were already popular locally in Philadelphia such as Denine and Jade Starling, a member of the group Pretty Poison.

== Track listing ==
No.	Title	Writer(s)	Length
1.	"Then Came You"	Amy Friedman	5:24
2.	"Forever And A Day"	Amy Friedman / K. Patterson / Michael Fortuna / Rob Federici	4:37
3.	"Never Say Goodbye"	Adam Marano	5:11
4.	"Silent Night"	Adam Marano	4:21
5.	"House Of Love"	Adam Marano / Rob Federici	4:29
6.	"Sex U Down"	Adam Marano	4:55
7.	"Dance With Me"	Adam Marano / Rob Federici	4:41
8.	"Money On You"	Adam Marano / Rob Federici	4:30
9.	"Don't Walk Away"	Adam Marano	4:14

== Charts ==
Singles

Year	Single	Chart	Position
1991	"Then Came You"	The Billboard Hot 100	91
