= Templeton Thompson =

American singer-songwriter

- Genres: Country
- Occupations: Singer; songwriter
- Instruments: Vocals; guitar
- Years active: 2003–present
- Label: Indie/Reve Records/Connected at the Hit Productions
- Website: www.templetonthompson.com/home/

Templeton Thompson is a country music singer-songwriter. Her songs have been recorded by performers such as Reba McEntire, Jo Dee Messina, Little Texas, and Sherrié Austin.

== Early life and education ==
Thompson was raised on 100 acres (40 ha) near Glen Rose, Texas, owned by her parents. She has been fond of both horses and music since she was young. At age 16, Thompson was injured and nearly lost two fingers on her left hand while trying to hitch a horse. She underwent eight surgeries and was left with "very limited mobility" on her hand, but taught herself to use a left-handed guitar.

Thompson later moved east, living in Virginia and Maryland before attending college at the University of Virginia, where she majored in English. Originally, she intended to go to law school, but in 1992, following graduation, she moved to Nashville to pursue a music career.

== Career ==
Thompson began to write music for pay in 1995, following an internship at Arista Records. When singer Reba McEntire recorded one of her songs, Thompson sang as a backup singer on the recording. Her two interests have come together in some of her albums, such as Girls and Horses, and songs, including "When I Get This Pony Rode". She also has had a song, "Settle Down, Cinderella", included on the soundtrack of the DVD Dr. Dolittle 3 and, in collaboration with her husband Sam Gay, provided the music for the DVD 7 Clinics with Buck Brannaman, a spinoff from the documentary Buck, directed by Cindy Meehl. In the course of creating the soundtrack for 7 Clinics, she also was able to collaborate with Meehl to create a professional music video for "When I Get This Pony Rode" that aired on Country Music Television, where it reached No. 1, and on Great American Country, where it remained in the top 10 for eight weeks.

In 2014, Thompson recorded a song she co-wrote with Gay, "Bring it on Home, Chrome", in honor of the racehorse California Chrome, with a portion of the profits going to the Thoroughbred retirement facility Old Friends Equine.

From late 2023 to January 2024, Thompson's 2011 song "This One's Gonna Fly" received attention online after people were unable to identify it from a snippet posted by WatZatSong user Kerlo, who claimed it originated from a bootleg DVD of Mr. Peabody & Sherman. In February, it was discovered that the story was a hoax and Kerlo always knew the song's identity.

== Personal life ==
Thompson describes herself as a "hippie chic cowgirl". Her musical influences include Emmylou Harris, Bonnie Raitt, Don Williams, and rock musician Sheryl Crow. In addition to writing and performing her own music, she sings as a session musician. She has a YouTube channel called "Life on Planet Cowgirl", and is certified to do equine-assisted therapy. A horse owner, her horse "Jane" was immortalized as a Breyer Model Horse.

She is married to fellow musician Sam Gay, with whom she collaborates on some of her music.

== Discography ==
- I Remember You (2003)
- I Still Feel (2004)
- Girls & Horses (2006)
- Life on Planet Cowgirl (2009)
- That's Just Me (2011)

Compilation Albums

- Icy Blue Heart (2012)
- Songs From 7 Clinics (2012)
