= Reina (singer) =

American dance-pop singer-songwriter (born 1975)

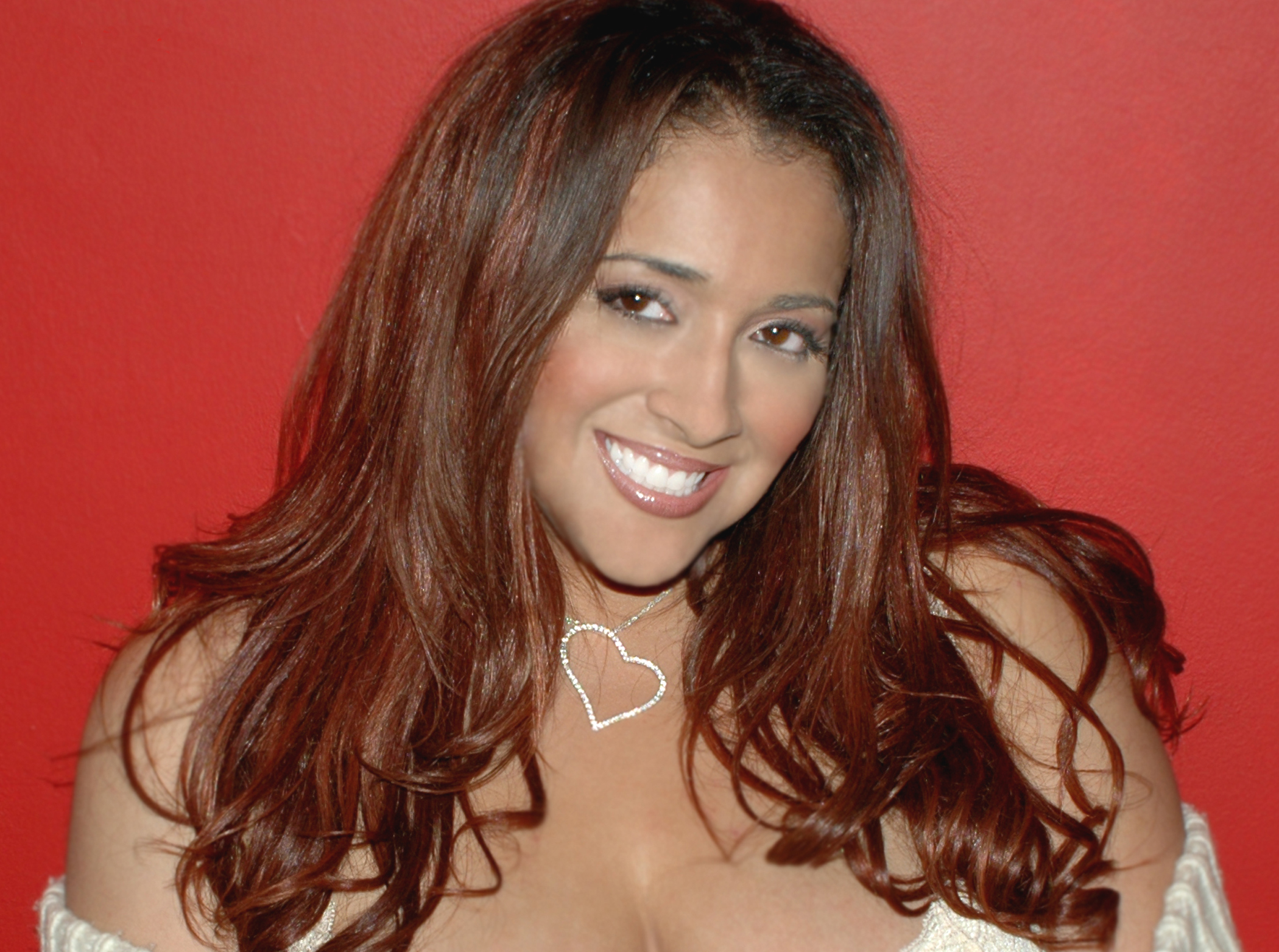

Background information
- Born: Lori Reina Goldstein; May 13, 1975 (age 51); Bronx, New York City
- Genres: Dance
- Occupations: Singer, songwriter
- Instrument: Vocals
- Years active: 1998–present
- Label: Robbins

Lori Reina Goldstein (born May 13, 1975) is an American dance-pop singer-songwriter.

== Early life ==
Lori Reina Goldstein was born on May 13, 1975, in The Bronx, New York City.

== Career ==
Reina was a backup singer for such music artists as Deborah Cox and Corina. In 1995, she released a self-titled R&B album as Lori Gold, and had a minor hit with "I Likes". In 1998, as Reina, she became an overnight sensation on the Dance/Club scene when "Find Another Woman" reached No. 2 on the Billboard Hot Dance Music/Club Play chart.

In 2003, she scored her biggest hit on the Billboard Hot 100, peaking at #96, when her single "No One's Gonna Change You" crossed over from the dance charts. In 2004 when "If I Close My Eyes" went to number 2 on Billboard's Dance/Mix Show Airplay chart, she garnered her biggest dance hit and in 2005 scored another top 5 on the same chart with "Forgive". All 3 tracks were from her third album overall, but first under her new name Reina "This Is Reina". Reina is promoted by AJ Iacona.

== Discography ==
=== Albums ===
- Lori Gold (1995)
- This Is Reina (2004)

=== Singles ===
- "I Likes" (1994) (as Lori Gold)
- "Tender Lovin' Care" (1996) (as Lori Gold)
- "Find Another Woman" (11/1998)
- "Anything For Love" (6/1999)
- "Got A Love For You" (Credited as Heaven Featuring Reina; 11/2000)
- "Miss the Way" (Credited as Razor N' Guido Featuring Reina; 4/2000)
- "Vivo per Lei"(with Angelo Venuto and The Sicilians; 2003)
- "No One's Gonna Change You" (2/2003)
- "If I Close My Eyes" (4/2004)
- "Christmas (Baby Please Come Home)" (11/2004)
- "Forgive" (5/2005)
- "Love Of My Life" (With Lucas Prata) (4/2006)
- "On My Own" (12/2006)
- "Just Let Go" (4/2010)
- "Forever" (with Sweet Rains; 10/2014)
- "Rain On Me" (Unreleased)
- "U there?" (Unreleased)
