= RUNAGROUND =

American singer-songwriter

Andrew Kirk
- Also known as: Runaground
- Born: Andrew James Kirk; April 7, 1987 (age 38); High Point, NC
- Origin: Maryville, TN
- Years active: 2014–present

Andrew Kirk (born April 7, 1987) also known by his stage name, Runaground, is an American singer-songwriter. He found success as a YouTube musician before moving to Los Angeles where he signed a recording deal with Sony/Robbins Entertainment. In 2014, he charted with first EP Anti-Gravity. In 2016, his song "Chase You Down" went to number 1 on the dance chart.

== Early life and education ==
Kirk was born on April 7, 1987 in High Point and raised in Thomasville, North Carolina and Maryville, Tennessee. He attended Middle Tennessee State University.

== Career ==
Kirk played in a band when he was 16 that opened for Switchfoot. After university, he became a worship leader for Life Church TV. He took his stage name from one of his grandfather's World War II stories.

He and his wife started a successful YouTube channel. In 2013, he moved to Los Angeles and released the song "Where do I Begin".

In 2014, he released his first EP Anti-Gravity which charted on the iTunes.

In 2015, Kirk collaborated with, produced, and co-wrote, original music & cover videos for other YouTube-based musicians such as Madilyn Bailey, Alexi Blue, Taryn Southern, and Ebony Day.

On July 5, 2015, he performed his original song "We Are One" live at the Dalai Lama's Global Compassion Summit at the Honda Center Arena in Anaheim, California. He was commissioned to write and produce an original song, which he wrote and produced the song within a week.

In November 2015, he performed live on tour in Belgium with hard dance DJ Mark with a K. The song "See Me Now" reached #19 on iTunes Belgium's pop chart. "Here We Come", a song written and co-produced by Runaground was also well-received. On November 17, 2015, he independently released the song "Stars Come Out" featuring The Disco Fries.

In 2016, he signed a recording deal with Sony/Robbins Entertainment. The same month, he appeared on the AXS TV cable show Breaking Band where he and Moby performing Moby's hit "Southside".

In March 2016, he released the song "Chase You Down" which went to number 1 on the dance chart. After 3 years in Los Angeles, Kirk moved to Nashville.
