= I'll Remember (disambiguation) =

"I'll Remember" is a song by Madonna.

I'll Remember may also refer to:

== Music ==
- I'll Remember, 1959 jazz album by Tony Scott (musician)

=== Songs ===
- "I'll Remember", 1962 song by R. Dean Taylor, No. 23 in Canada
- "I'll Remember", 1966 song by The Kinks from Face to Face
- "I'll Remember", 1986 song by The Chameleons from Strange Times
- "In the Still of the Nite (I'll Remember)", 1992 song by Boyz II Men

== Television ==
- "I'll Remember" (The Vampire Diaries), an episode of the television series The Vampire Diaries.

== See also ==
- "I Will Remember", 1995 song by Toto
- "I Will Remember", 1987 song by Hard Rain
