= Chapter One (Collage album) =

Studio album by Collage
- Released: June 10, 1994
- Genre: Freestyle
- Length: 50:23
- Label: Viper / Metropolitan Records
- Producer: Adam Marano

Collage chronology
Chapter One (1994)	Greatest Hits (1996)

Chapter One is the debut album by Collage, released on June 10, 1994, by the label Viper/Metropolitan Records.

Three singles were released — "I'll Be Loving You", the most successful single from the album, reaching No. 56 on the Billboard Hot 100, "Gangster of Love" and "Diana".

== Track listing ==
No.	Title	Length
1.	"I'll Be Loving You"	3:51
2.	"Gangster of Love"	4:12
3.	"Tell Me Boy / Tell Me Girl" (share Denine)	4:13
4.	"Angel"	4:03
5.	"Diana"	4:37
6.	"Cheap Thrills"	6:57
7.	"From Here to Eternity"	3:53
8.	"Here We Go Again"	5:35
9.	"Diana" (House)	4:35
10.	"Tell Me Boy/Tell Me Girl" (House)	4:10
11.	"Gangster of Love"	4:12

== Charts ==
Singles - Billboard

Year	Single	Chart	Position
1993–1994	"I'll Be Loving You"	Billboard Hot 100	56
1993–1994	"I'll Be Loving You"	Hot Dance Music/Maxi-Singles Sales	32
1993–1994	"I'll Be Loving You"	Rhythmic Top 40	18
1993–1994	"I'll Be Loving You"	Top 40 Mainstream	28
