= GT Ofice =

GT_Ofice
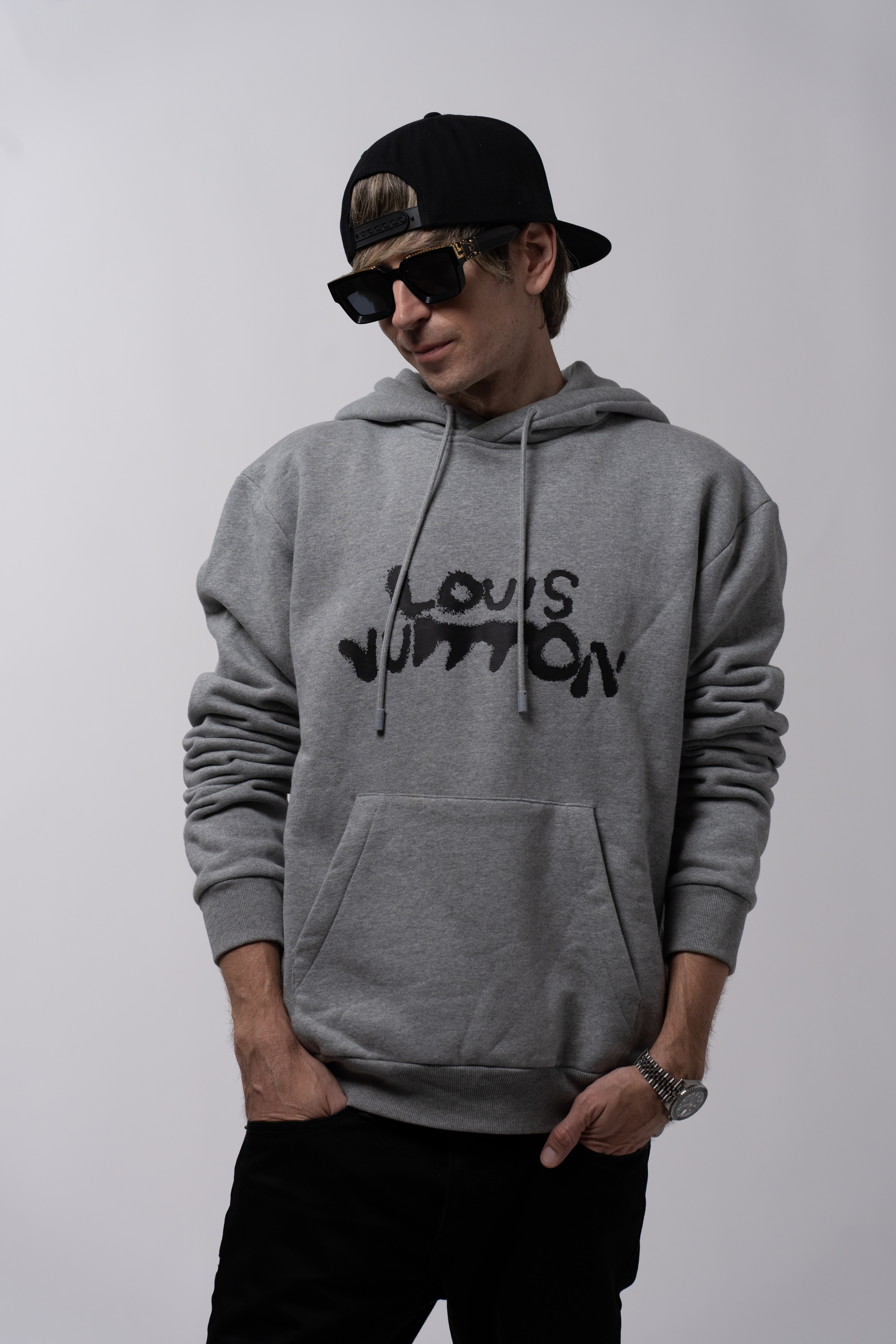

Background information
- Born: James Caine Sheppard; October 31, 1986 (age 40); Ocean City, MD, United States
- Genres: EDM; Progressive house; Future house
- Occupations: DJ, music producer
- Years active: 2018–present
- Label: CAINE Records
- Website: gtoficemusic.com

GT_Ofice (real name: James Caine Sheppard, born October 31, 1986) is an American DJ, music producer, and actor from New York. He was born in Ocean City, Maryland, United States. The first three letters of GT_Ofice stand for “good times only”.

== Career ==
=== Acting career ===
He started doing commercials when he was 3 years old and started doing TV shows in 2009. He played the role of 'Morgan' on the TV show The Big C on SHOWTIME.

=== Music career ===
He started his music production career in 2018. He has been on the Billboard Dance/Mixshow airplay charts 8 times since 2023. He is also host of the radio show 'Good Times Only', syndicated in different countries. In March 21, 2025 he topped the chart with his single ‘Someone Else’.

== Discography ==
=== Singles ===
| Year | Title | Peak chart positions |
| Year | Title | US |
|---|---|---|
| 2026 | “EASY” Ft. Matthew Topper, Martial Simon | 25 |
| 2025 | “No Broke Girls” Ft. Matthew Topper & DJ Snowden | 15 |
| 2025 | "Two Hands" ft. Martial Simon & Matthew Topper | 12 |
| 2025 | "Something New" ft. Matthew Topper & Petie | 8 |
| 2024 | "Someone Else" | 1 |
| 2024 | "Ecstasy" ft. Matthew Topper & Robbie Rosen | |
| 2024 | "No Tears" ft. Matthew Topper ft. Sarah de Warren | |
| 2023 | "Every Thought Of You" ft. ALWZ SNNY | 26 |
| 2023 | "Feels Like Us" ft. ALWZ SNNY & Robbie Rosen | 38 |
| 2023 | "Can't Deny" ft. JAYEM & Alix Robson | |
| 2023 | "Invite Only", with Chris Padin ft. Krysta Youngs | |
| 2022 | "TUFF" ft. VASSY | |
| 2022 | "Never Together" | 30 |
| 2022 | "Spell", with Romi Lux ft. Salvo | |
| 2022 | "Moving On", with Britt Lari | |
| 2021 | "Young Hearts" ft. MIME and LINNEY | |
| 2021 | "Not The One", with Linney | |
| 2021 | "Try This Again", with Britt Lari | |
| 2021 | "Wild Hearts", with Nick Elliott & Jantine | |
| 2021 | "Pieces", with Jantine | |
| 2021 | "Ooh La La", with Britt Lari | |
| 2021 | "Tastes Like Summer", with Linney | |
| 2021 | "Body Talks" ft. Zhiko | |
| 2021 | "Yesterday", with Nick Elliott | |
| 2020 | "Stay the Night" ft. Kastra & xoxomyah | |
| 2020 | "Nextel" | |
| 2020 | "Out Of My Head", with MIME | |
| 2019 | "Live MY Life" | |
