= Rockell =

American singer

- Born: Rachel Alexandra Mercaldo; March 4, 1977 (age 49); Staten Island, New York City, New York, U.S.
- Genres: Freestyle, dance-pop, hi-NRG, house
- Instruments: Vocals
- Years active: 1996–present
- Label: Sony BMG

Rachel Alexandra Mercaldo (born March 4, 1977, in Staten Island, New York), known professionally as Rockell, is an American freestyle, hi-NRG and pop singer and songwriter, best known for her 1997 hit single, "In a Dream".

== Career ==
=== 1996–2001: What Are You Lookin' At? and Instant Pleasure ===
In 1996, Rockell released her debut single, "I Fell in Love". In the late 1990s, she had major dance hits with the songs "In a Dream", "When I'm Gone" and "Can't We Try" (a duet with Collage and remake of the Dan Hill and Vonda Shepard 1987 hit song). All of these tracks appeared on her 1998 debut album entitled What Are You Lookin' At?. "I Fell In Love", distributed by the then BMG Canada, reached #1 on the Canadian Singles Chart while the follow-up classic inspired by DJ UpperCutz, "In a Dream" reached #6. She released a second album, Instant Pleasure, in 2000. Instant Pleasure included the single "What U Did 2 Me" which reached #101 on the Billboard Hot 100 chart in 2001. She released a music video for the single. Remixes of "What U Did 2 Me" were released including the popular JP's Radio Mix.

=== 2005–present: Return to music ===
In 2005, she returned with "L.O.V.E", produced by DJ Mickey Bono of the Beat Thrillerz. A limited independent release had a trance remix by Lenny "Linus" Douglas and freestyle remixes by Russ Castella and Randy Taylor-Weber, the original writer/producer of "In a Dream".

In spring 2007, Rockell recorded the single "Playin' My Love". It was released to Dance/Rhythmic format radio in July 2007. A freestyle remix by Salsation 3 was released in November 2007. A nationwide tour with several dance artists including Joe Zangie was announced as well. In November of that same year, she released a dance single with Canada's Odeon Records, "You Keep Me Hangin' On", a remake of the Supremes original.

On June 3, 2009, Rockell released the duet single "When I Want You Back" with Joe Zangie. “When I Want You Back” was previously recorded by Wendy. Neither cuts of the song charted. Later in June, she released a dance cover of Donna Summer's "On the Radio".

In 2012, Rockell signed a new management deal with BlackCole Entertainment. On December 11 of that year, she released her single "Turn Up the Heat" which had a new sound of freestyle and dance-pop from her previous works. The track contains a rap and usage of high vocals.

== Chart success ==
"I Fell in Love" peaked at #61 on the Billboard Hot 100 in early 1997. It hit the #1 spot on the Canadian Singles Chart during that year, making it the most successful freestyle dance music single of the decade in Canada. The single also peaked at #9 on the Hot Dance Singles Sales chart in the US.

"In a Dream", the follow-up to "I Fell In Love", peaked at #72 on the Billboard Hot 100 in June, 1998. It was #6 on the Hot 100 Canadian Singles Chart and solidified Rockell's position on the artist roster of the then BMG Music Canada. It also peaked at #13 on the Hot Dance Singles Sales chart.

"Can't We Try" with Collage peaked at #59 on the Billboard Hot 100 in 1998. The single also peaked at #11 on the Hot Dance Singles Sales chart.

"When I'm Gone" failed to chart on the Billboard Hot 100 in 1999, but appeared on the Hot Dance Airplay and Hot Dance Music/Club Play charts. It also peaked at #21 on the Hot Dance Singles Sales chart.

Rockell's lead single to her second album Instant Pleasure, "What U Did 2 Me", was her best-selling single. It fared well on the Hot Dance Airplay and Hot Dance Music/Club Play charts.

She also released "The Dance" (a cover of the Garth Brooks hit) and "Tears", but neither of these singles charted on the Hot 100. Both singles performed well on the Hot Dance Music/Club Play and Hot Dance Airplay charts. "The Dance" peaked at #27 and "Tears" peaked at #16 on the Hot Dance Singles Sales chart.

== Discography ==
=== Studio albums ===
Year	Album details	Positions
Year	Album details	Top Heat
1998	What Are You Lookin' At?: Released: April 28, 1998; Label: Robbins Entertainment; Formats: CD, CS	30
2000	Instant Pleasure: Released: October 10, 2000; Label: Robbins Entertainment; Formats: CS, CD	–
"-" denotes a release that did not make the stop.

=== Singles ===
List of singles, with selected chart positions, showing year released and album name
Year	Title	Peak chart positions		Album
Year	Title	US	CAN	Album
1996	"I Fell in Love"	61	8	What Are You Lookin' At?
1997	"In a Dream"	72	6	What Are You Lookin' At?
1998	"Can't We Try" (duet with Collage)	59	—	What Are You Lookin' At?
1999	"When I'm Gone"	—	—	What Are You Lookin' At?
2000	"The Dance"	—	—	Instant Pleasure
2001	"What U Did 2 Me"	—	30	Instant Pleasure
2002	"Tears"	—	—	Instant Pleasure
2005	"L.O.V.E"	—	—	Non-album singles
2007	"Playin' My Love"	—	—	Non-album singles
2007	"You Keep Me Hangin' On"	—	—	Non-album singles
2009	"When I Want You Back" (duet with Joe Zangie)	—	—	Non-album singles
2009	"On the Radio"	—	—	Non-album singles
2012	"Turn Up the Heat"	—	—	Non-album singles
"—" denotes a title that was not released or did not chart in that territory.

== Cover versions ==
- "Dream Boy/Dream Girl" – original by Cynthia and Johnny O
- "Can't We Try" – original by Dan Hill and Vonda Shepard
- "You Keep Me Hangin' On" – original by Diana Ross & The Supremes
- "When I'm Gone" – original by Albert Hammond
- "Show Me the Way" – original by Peter Frampton
- "We Just Disagree" – original by Dave Mason
- "Love Won't Let Me Wait" – original by George Kerr
- "The Dance" – original by Garth Brooks
