= Irene Nelson =

Russian singer, songwriter and record producer (born 1972)

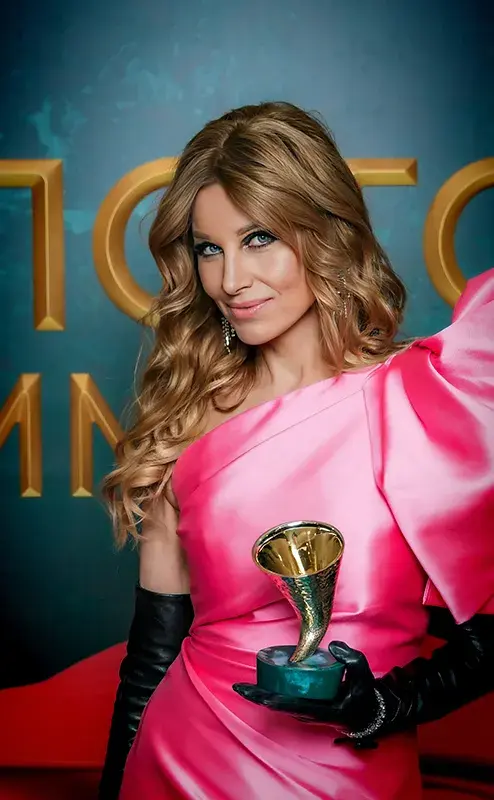

Background information
- Born: Irina Anatolyevna Tereshina; 19 April 1972 (age 54); Barabinsk
- Genres: Pop, dance, Soft rock
- Occupations: Singer, songwriter, music producer
- Years active: 1992–present
- Labels: Reflexmusic, NTMG, UMG
- Spouse: Vyacheslav Tyurin
- Website: www.irinanelson.com

Irene Anatolyevna Nelson (Russian: Ирина Анатольевна Нельсон, born Tereshina, Russian: Терешина; 19 April 1972) is a Russian pop-rock recording artist, songwriter and producer. She was successful in the 1990s under the pseudonym Diana. She moved to Germany and in 2000, created Reflex which achieved success in the CIS. During her participation in the band, she won three Golden Gramophone Awards.

In 2010, her first English single, "Sunrise", found success on the dance chart reaching # 35 in Billboard's Hot Dance Club Play.

She was awarded the Medal of the Order "For Merit to the Fatherland" II class for merits in the development of culture, a great contribution to the preparation and conduct of important creative and humanitarian activities on 18 May 2017.

== Discography ==
=== Albums ===
under the pseudonym Diana

- 1993 – I Want to Love
- 1994 – I'll be back
- 1996 – Don't Tell
- 1997 – Burn, it's Clear!
- 1998 – Then Piss Off
- 1998 – Do Not Kiss Her
- 1998 – The Best
- 1999 – Make a Step

with REFLEX

- 2001 – Meet the New Day
- 2002 – Go Crazy
- 2002 – I Will Always Wait for You
- 2002 – This is Love
- 2003 – Non Stop
- 2005 – Lyrics. I Love.
- 2005 – Pulse
- 2006 – Harem (Lounge feat. Chillout remixes)
- 2014 – Memories
- 2015 – Adult Girls
- 2019 – Harem 2 (Lounge feat. Chillout remixes)

solo career

- 2011 – Sunrise

=== English singles ===
- 2010 – Sunrise
- 2011 – When Apples Fall to the Sky
