= I Remember You (Denine song) =

Single by Denine

from the album To Be Continued...
- Released: 1993
- Genre: Freestyle, electro
- Label: Viper 7 Records
- Songwriter: Adam Marano

Denine singles chronology
| "Baby I Love You" (1991) | "I Remember You" (1993) | "Tearshed '93" (1993) |

"I Remember You" is the second single from Denine. The song was originally released on the compilation album Viper's Freestyle Hit Parade, the Metropolitan Recording Corporation label.

The song was released in 1993 and was re-released on cassette format. In 1994, the song peaked at No. 16 on the Bubbling Under Hot 100 Singles chart in Billboard Magazine.

== Track listing ==
12" single

| No. | Title | Length |
|---|---|---|
| 1. | "I Remember You" (Power Mix 96) | 4:45 |
| 2. | "I Remember You" (New School Mix) | 4:19 |
| 3. | "I Remember You" (Synthapella) | 1:37 |
| 4. | "I Remember You" (Miami Bonus Beats) | 1:04 |

== Chart ==
| Chart (1994) | Peak position |
|---|---|
| US (Bubbling Under Hot 100 Singles) | 16 |
