= I Will Remember You =

I Will Remember You may refer to:

- "I Will Remember You" (Angel), a 1999 episode of the TV series Angel
- "I Will Remember You" (Amy Grant song), 1992
- "I Will Remember You" (Sarah McLachlan song), 1995
- "I Will Remember You", a song by Ryan Cabrera from his album The Moon Under Water
- "I Will Remember You", a song by Ed Sheeran from his album =

== See also ==
- "I'll Remember You", a song written by Kui Lee and first released by Don Ho
- I'll Remember (disambiguation)
