= Reflex (group) =

Russian girl band

Reflex (Russian: Рефлекс) is a Russian pop-group: Irene Nelson (Lead Vocals). The band was created in 1999 and the first single called Distant Light conquered the hit parade of Europa Plus radio station. All Reflex's music is composed by Vyacheslav Tyurin.

== Discography ==
- 2001 — Meet the New Day
- 2002 — Go Crazy
- 2002 — I Will Always Wait for You
- 2002 — This is Love
- 2003 — Non Stop
- 2005 — Lyrics. I Love.
- 2005 — Pulse
- 2006 — Harem (Lounge feat. Chillout remixes)
- 2008 — Blondes 126
- 2014 — Memories
- 2015 — Adult Girls
- 2025 — Larger than Life

== Trivia ==
- Reflex’s music video to the song Polovinka was the first music video in Russia to appear in HD format. The Video was shot in Dubai, United Arab Emirates.
- In 2005 the group took part in the national competition to represent Russia in the Eurovision Song Contest, but was dropped in the semifinal.

== Awards ==
Reflex six-time winner of Golden Gramophone Award.
