= Then Came You (T.P.E. song) =

Single by T.P.E.

from the album T.P.E. Featuring Adam Marano
- Released: 1991
- Genre: Freestyle dance-pop
- Length: 4:35
- Label: Micmac
- Songwriter: Amy Friedman

"Then Came You" is the debut single from dance-pop and freestyle project T.P.E. from their album T.P.E. Featuring Adam Marano, released in 1991. This was the only single from T.P.E. to reach the charts, peaking at number 91 on the Billboard Hot 100 in the United States.

== Track listing ==
US 12" single

No.	Title	Length
1.	"Then Came You" (Club)	5:19
2.	"Then Came You" (Dub)	5:20
3.	"Then Came You" (Radio)	4:35
4.	"Then Came You" (Bonus Beat)	2:27

== Charts ==
Chart (1991)	Peak position
US Billboard Hot 100	91
