= I Remember You (Templeton Thompson album) =

Studio album by Templeton Thompson
- Released: May 2003, (Reissued September 25, 2010)
- Genre: Country, Horse Country, Acoustic Country
- Length: Standard: 41:06
- Label: Reve Records/Connected At The Hit Productions
- Producer: Sam Gay

Templeton Thompson chronology
I Remember You (2003)	I Still Feel (2004)

I Remember You is the first studio album from independent Nashville singer-songwriter, Templeton Thompson. The album was released in May 2003 through Templeton's imprint, Reve Records. The album was re-released on September 25, 2010 to benefit the Proud Spirit Horse Sanctuary. The original version featured twelve tracks. When re-released three bonus tracks were added including, "They Can't Hurt You Now," "I Love To Run," and "Never Be the Same."

== Background ==
Thompson has stated that the I Remember You album was inspired by her work with the EAGALA foundation. Once the albums were pressed, Thompson and her husband, musical partner, Sam Gay focused on promoting the new album by way of touring.

"We put together my first CD “i remember you,” inspired by my work with EAGALA (the Equine Assisted Growth & Learning Association, www.eagala.org), had a thousand copies pressed up and headed for Texas. We were aware of the great music scene in Texas and I’m a Texas girl so, when we decided to really focus on touring, that’s where the compass pointed.” - Templeton Thompson

== Track listing ==
Templeton Thompson wrote or cowrote each of the album's tracks, including the reissue bonus tracks.

	Song title	Writers	Length
1	"I Remember You"	Templeton Thompson, Sam Gay, Porter Howell	3:19
2	"When I Get Where I'm Goin'"	Thompson, Gay, Fred Wilhelm	3:34
3	"Somethin' With Wings"	Thompson, Gay, Howell	3:37
4	"Right Colored Glasses"	Thompson, Gay, Cliff, Cliff Goldmacher	2:53
5	"That's Where I Wanna Live"	Thompson, Howell, Gay	2:24
6	"A Little Rain"	Thompson, Kevin Fisher	3:02
7	"I Can Do This"	Bonnie Bramlett, Gay, Thompson	3:48
8	"Lesson In There Somewhere"	Thompson, Gay, Darin Lake	3:18
9	"What I Believe"	Thompson, Gay	3:51
10	"We're All On Our Way Somewhere"	Thompson	3:43
11	"It Takes Her Away"	Thompson	3:19
12	"Must've Been A Cowboy"	Thompson, Gay	3:36
2010 Re-release Bonus Tracks
13	"They Can't Hurt You Now"	Thompson, Gay, Sally Barris	3:18
14	"I Love To Run"	Thompson, Gay	4:29
15	"Never Be The Same"	Thompson, Roy Hurd	3:43
