= Sunrise (Irene Nelson song) =

Single by Irene Nelson
- Released: January 26, 2010
- Recorded: 2009
- Genre: Pop/Rock
- Length: 3:33
- Label: NTMG, Bungalo, UMG
- Songwriter(s): Leona Voynalovich
- Producer(s): Steve Orchard

"Sunrise" is a song by Russian recording artist Irene Nelson. The song was written by Leona Voynalovich and produced by Vlad Tyurin. Its released on January 26, 2010 by Bungalo Records, as the first English single.

== Track listing ==
- CD single
1. Sunrise [Jason Nevins Radio Edit] 3:37
2. Sunrise [Jason Nevins Dark Radio Edit] 3:49
3. Sunrise [Jason Nevins Extended Remix] 7:16
4. Sunrise [Jason Nevins Dark Club Remix] 6:48
5. Sunrise [Album Version] 3:50
- Dance Remixes
1. Sunrise [Album Version] 3:50
2. Sunrise [Jason Nevins Radio Edit] 3:38
3. Sunrise [Chew Fu Wasabi Radio Fix] 3:02
4. Sunrise [Fonzerelli Electro House Radio Edit] 3:40
5. Sunrise [Fonzerelli Piano Radio Edit] 3:32
6. Sunrise [Jason Nevins Dark Radio Edit] 3:45
7. Sunrise [Chew Fu Wasabi Extended Fix] 6:38
8. Sunrise [Chew Fu Wasabi Dub] 6:08
9. Sunrise [Fonzerelli Electro House Club Mix] 6:27
10. Sunrise [Fonzerelli Electro House Dub] 6:13
11. Sunrise [Fonzerelli Piano Club Mix] 6:33
12. Sunrise [Jason Nevins Extended Mix] 7:14
13. Sunrise [Jason Nevins Dark Club Mix] 6:42

== Charts ==
Chart (2010)	Peak position
U.S. Billboard Hot Dance Club Play	35
