= Robbins Entertainment =

American dance music record label

Robbins Entertainment LLC
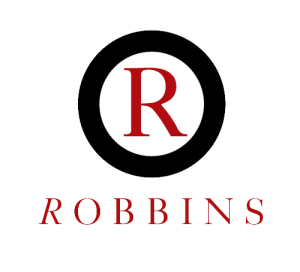
- Parent company: Sony Music Entertainment
- Founded: 1996; 30 years ago
- Founder: Cory Robbins
- Distributor: The Orchard
- Genre: Dance; pop
- Country of origin: U.S.
- Location: New York City
- Official website: www.robbinsent.com

Robbins Entertainment LLC is an American dance music record label. It is owned by Cory Robbins and has released music by Cascada, such as their hit single "Everytime We Touch". It is also the company responsible for the Dance Party Like It's.... series and the Trance Party series, as well as the Mixshow series. Several one-volume CDs like Dance Rock have also been released. The label is distributed by The Orchard and is one of two labels in the Sony Music line-up that specializes in dance and electronic music, the other being Ultra Music (which Sony acquired in 2013 in an investment deal), who has collaborated with Robbins on several occasions. Robbins Entertainment has a country music division named Robbins Nashville, which was created in May 2007.

== History ==
Robbins Entertainment was founded in 1996 by Cory Robbins, co-founder of Profile Records. This new record label was based out of New York City. Most of the artists signed to the label are successful overseas and European acts. American acts like Rockell and Reina, however, had Billboard Hot 100 hits. Spanish DJ Sammy gave Robbins its first top 10 Hot 100 hit in 2002 with "Heaven" which featured Dutch recording artist Do. The Belgian group D.H.T.'s 'Listen To Your Heart' also made #8 on the U.S. charts, and #1 on Pop Airplay. Two other Belgian acts - Ian Van Dahl ("Castles in the Sky") and Lasgo ("Something" & "Alone") also made the U.S. Billboard charts. Robbins was able to attract further foreign talent as Germany's Cascada following this, which helped the company gain more success when "Everytime We Touch", "What Hurts the Most, and most recently "Evacuate the Dancefloor" became mainstream pop hits as well.

== Notable artists ==
- Afrojack
- Akcent
- AnnaGrace
- Borgore
- Carnage
- Cascada
- Dana Rayne
- Darude
- D.H.T.
- Disconfect
- Dimitri Vegas & Like Mike
- DJ Sammy
- Jenna Drey
- Edun
- Elena
- Heather Leigh West
- Ian Van Dahl
- Lasgo
- Kate Ryan
- K5 (band)
- Milky
- Reina
- Rockell
- RUNAGROUND
- September
- Shermanology
- Judy Torres
- Velvet
- Yolanda Be Cool

== Albums ==
- Ace by Ian Van Dahl
- Everytime We Touch by Cascada
- Far Away by Lasgo
- Heaven by DJ Sammy
- Listen To Your Heart by D.H.T.
- Lost & Found by Ian Van Dahl
- Perfect Day by Cascada
- September by September
- Some Things by Lasgo
- This Is Reina by Reina
- Evacuate the Dancefloor by Cascada
- Love CPR by September

== See also ==
- List of record labels
