= Longer Fuse =

Studio album by Dan Hill
- Released: 1977
- Genre: Pop
- Length: 40:13
- Labels: 20th Century Fox (USA/UK); GRT (Canada)
- Producer: Matthew McCauley; Fred Mollin

Dan Hill chronology
Hold On (1976)	Longer Fuse (1977)	Frozen in the Night (1978)

Longer Fuse is a 1977 album by Canadian pop singer Dan Hill. It reached number 2 in Canada, and was in the Top 100 for 42 weeks. It was number 7 in the top 100 albums chart for 1978.

Hill recorded the songs for this album at Manta Sound on Adelaide Street in Toronto.

== Track listing ==
All songs written by Dan Hill, unless otherwise stated.

1. "Sometimes When We Touch" (Dan Hill, Barry Mann) - 4:12
2. "14 Today" - 4:29
3. "In the Name of Love" - 2:33
4. "Crazy" (Dan Hill, Don Potter) - 4:05
5. "McCarthy's Day" - 3:53
6. "Jean" - 4:28
7. "You Are All I See" - 2:20
8. "Southern California" - 4:10
9. "Longer Fuse" - 4:20
10. "Still Not Used To" - 4:25

== Personnel ==
- Dan Hill – lead vocals, backing vocals (3–6, 8, 9), guitar (5), acoustic guitar (7, 8, 10)
- Bobby Ogdin – acoustic piano (1, 6, 8), Fender Rhodes (2, 3, 4, 9), electric piano (6), organ (8)
- Matthew McCauley – string arrangements (1, 6), synthesizers (2, 5, 6, 7), ARP synthesizer (4), backing vocals (4, 5, 6, 8, 9), string conductor (6), organ (9), cello arrangements (10)
- John Capek – Rhodes piano (5)
- Eric Robertson – Fender Rhodes (10)
- Don Potter – acoustic guitar (1–4, 6–10), string conductor (1), backing vocals (4, 5), guitar (5)
- Bob Mann – electric guitar (1–4, 9), acoustic guitar (2)
- Ben Mink – mandolin (5, 10)
- Tom Szczeniak – bass (1, 3, 4, 9)
- Rick Homme – bass (2, 7)
- Dennis Pendrith – bass (5)
- Bob Boucher – bass (6, 8, 10)
- Larrie Londin – drums (1–4, 6, 8, 9)
- Jørn Andersen – drums (5)
- Fred Mollin – percussion (1–5, 8, 9), acoustic guitar (4, 9), cabasa (4), backing vocals (4, 5, 6, 8, 9)
- Ronald Laurie – cello (10)

=== Production ===
- Matthew McCauley – producer
- Fred Mollin – producer
- Bernie Finkelstein – co-producer (5)
- Don Potter – co-producer (5)
- William McCauley – executive producer
- Andrew Hermant – engineer (1–9)
- Ken Friesen – engineer (10)
- Bob Ludwig – mastering
- Bart Scholaes – art direction, design, photography
- Recorded at Manta Sound, Eastern Sound and The Cathedral Church of St. James (Toronto, Ontario, Canada).
- Mastered at Masterdisk (New York City, New York, USA).

== Commercial performance ==
=== Charts ===
==== Weekly charts ====
Chart (1978)	Peak position
Australian (Kent Music Report)	9
Canada Top Albums/CDs (RPM)	2
US Billboard 200	21

==== Year-end charts ====
Chart (1978)	Position
Canada Top Albums/CDs (RPM)	7

=== Sales ===
Region	Certification	Certified units/sales
Canada	—	300,000
United States	—	1,000,000
