= All I See Is Your Face =

Single by Dan Hill

from the album Frozen in the Night
- A-side: "All I See Is Your Face" (3:28)
- B-side: "Longer Fuse" (4:20)
- Released: 1978 (original)
- Genre: Pop rock, soft rock
- Length: 7:48
- Label: 20th Century Fox (TC-2378)
- Songwriter(s): Dan Hill

Dan Hill singles chronology
| "Sometimes When We Touch" (1977) | "All I See Is Your Face" (1978) | "Let the Song Last Forever" (1978) |

"All I See Is Your Face" is a 1978 song written and performed by Dan Hill. It was released as a 7-inch single from Dan Hill's Frozen in the Night album, with "Longer Fuse" on the B-side. The song was produced by Fred Mollin and Matthew McCauley. The song reached No. 8 on the US Adult Contemporary chart and No. 41 on the Billboard Hot 100. The song has been included on several compilation albums, including The Best of Dan Hill (1980), The Dan Hill Collection (1983), Let Me Show You: Greatest Hits & More (1994), and Love of My Life: The Best of Dan Hill (1999).

== Chart positions ==
| Chart | Peak position |
|---|---|
| US Billboard Hot 100 | 41 |
| US Adult Contemporary | 8 |
