= Fred Mollin =

Music composer (born 1953)

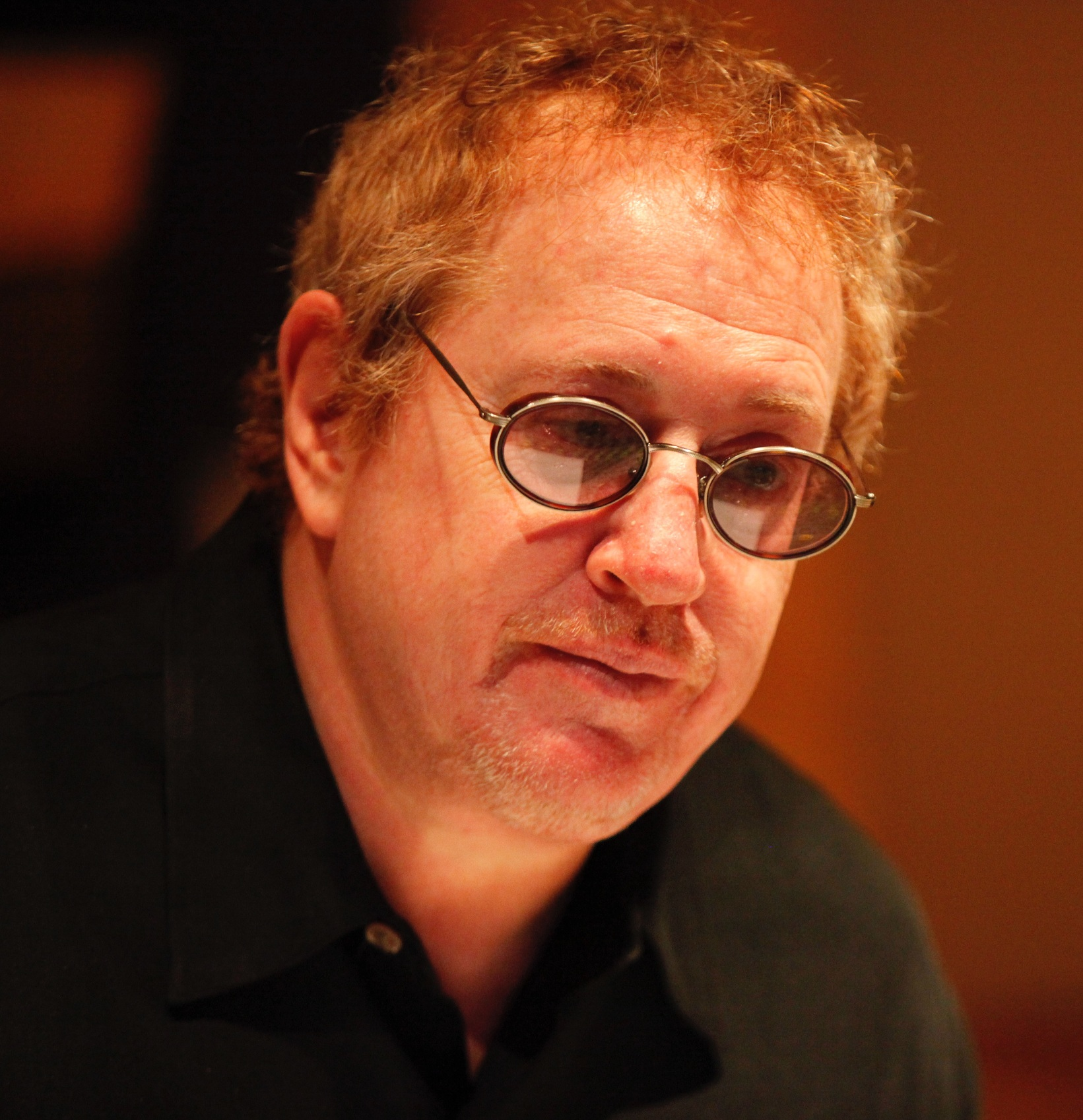
- Mollin in 2010
- Born: Frederic Ira Mollin; February 10, 1953 (age 73); Amityville, New York, U.S.
- Occupations: Record producer; multi-instrumentalist; film & TV composer; arranger; musical director; music supervisor; songwriter
- Years active: 1972–present
- Children: 2
- Musical career
- Instruments: Guitar; keyboards; bass; drums; percussion; vocals
- Labels: Walt Disney Records; Columbia Records; eOne Records; EMI Records; Atlantic Records; Melody Place
- Website: fredmollin.com

Fred Mollin is an American and Canadian record producer, musician, film and TV composer, music director, music supervisor, and songwriter. He has produced records for Jimmy Webb, Johnny Mathis, Billy Ray Cyrus, Lamont Dozier and America, and has composed music for Beverly Hills, 90210, Friday the 13th (films and television), Forever Knight, Hard Copy, and many more. Mollin rose to prominence early in his career by co-producing (with Matthew McCauley) Dan Hill's international hit record, "Sometimes When We Touch", in 1977.

As an artist, he has written and produced music for a series of children's albums, including Disney: Lullaby Album: Instrumental Favorites For Baby, peaking at #6 on January 26, 2001, on Billboard's Kid Album music chart; and Disney's Princess Lullaby Album, which peaked at No. 23 on October 25, 2002 (Billboard). He created the musical group Fred Mollin and the Blue Sea Band, composing and producing albums such as Finding Nemo-Ocean Favorites, Lightning McQueen's Fast Tracks, and others, primarily released on Disney/Pixar albums.

== Early life ==
Fred Mollin was born (February 10, 1953) in Amityville, New York to Edward and Pauline Mollin, and is the youngest of three siblings. He attended Calhoun High School in Merrick, New York.

In an interview with Spirit of Harmony, Mollin said, "When my parents would tell their friends that I was leaving high school at 16 to make a life as a musician, they would all say 'we're so sorry,' as if I was terminally ill. In that day and age, it would have sounded better if I had gone off to join the circus".

== Career ==
At age 18, Mollin moved to Toronto, Canada in 1971. His brother Larry had moved there a year before and urged Fred to come and see the creative possibilities. In 1972, they formed Canada's first improvisational comedy group, Homemade Theatre. The four-man troupe consisted of Fred (musician, composer, singer, and actor), Phil Savath, Barry Flatman, and his brother, Larry, who also performed for three years on their own CBC television series, Homemade Television. In 1975, Homemade Theatre was awarded a Canadian Gold Record for their novelty single, "Santa Jaws".

=== Record producer ===
Mollin co-produced (with Matthew McCauley) Sometimes When We Touch, by Dan Hill, which became an international hit record in 1977. From 1977 through 1985 Mollin produced such artists as Jimmy Webb, America, and Randy Edelman. He also co-wrote and co-produced Stan Meissner's hit single "One Chance", which was covered by Eddie Money on his platinum album Can’t Hold Back. Mollin started a new career in 1985 as a TV and film composer, which became a full-time occupation until 1996 when he started to make the transition back to record production with the album Ten Easy Pieces by Jimmy Webb.

Mollin relocated to Nashville in 2001, where he went back to being a full-time record producer for various artists and projects.

=== Duets producer ===
Mollin is known as a record producer with a long history of producing duets involving well-known and iconic artists. These include Willie Nelson, Billy Joel, Carly Simon, Vince Gill, Glen Campbell, Crosby and Nash, Art Garfunkel, Jackson Browne, Linda Ronstadt, Michael McDonald, Amy Holland, David Pack, Sheryl Crow, Natalie Cole, Gregory Porter, Gloria Estefan, Billy Ray Cyrus and Miley Cyrus, and Chris Cornell, among others. The albums by Jimmy Webb, Ten Easy Pieces, Just Across the River, and Still Within the Sound Of My Voice, have the most number of guest artist duet appearances. Other notable album examples with numerous duets are Johnny Mathis' Sending You A Little Christmas, Kris Kristofferson's The Austin Sessions, Barry Mann's Soul And Inspiration, Lamont Dozier's Reimagination, and Rita Wilson's AM/FM.

=== Film and television music composer ===
In 1987, Mollin's work on Paramount's Friday the 13th: The Series gave way to 16 uninterrupted years of composing for film and television. His most well-known TV series include Tri-Star's Forever Knight, Spelling's Beverly Hills, 90210, Paramount's Hard Copy, Columbia Pictures' The New Gidget and USA Network's TekWar. His feature film credits include Friday the 13th Part 7 - The New Blood and Friday the 13th Part VIII: Jason Takes Manhattan. His TV movies include NBC's Amy Fisher: My Story, VH1's Daydream Believers-The Monkees' Story, and CBC TV's Little Criminals. He composed and performed the soundtrack for the television series Friday the 13th, mainly using synthesizers and samplers. The music was released on a soundtrack album by GNP Crescendo as the album Friday the 13th: The Series.

Mollin won a Gemini award for Best Original Music Score for a Series, Beyond Reality, in 1991.

=== Children's music ===
Mollin co-created the children's musical group Rugrats with Ronney Abramson and Ron Garant. The group's 1983 debut album, Rugrat Rock, was co-produced by Mollin; it won the Best Children's Album category at the Juno Awards of 1984. In 1985 they recorded a second album, The Rugrats Rock On.

In the early 2000s, Mollin began arranging and producing a series of Disney Lullaby albums: Disney's Lullaby Album: Gentle Instrumental Favorites for Babies (2000), Disney's Lullaby Album (2002), Disney's Princess Lullaby Album (2002), Disney's Christmas Lullaby Album (2003), Disney's Lullaby & Goodnight (2004), and Disney's Lullaby Album, Vol.2 (all released on Walt Disney Records).

In 2004, Mollin created Fred Mollin and the Blue Sea Band, a loose aggregate of studio musicians and guest singers Chris Stapleton, Tom Hambridge, Tim Ruppert, Lari White, Kevin Montgomery, Gunnar Nelson, Johnny Neel, and Webb Wilder, among others, primarily heard on Disney/Pixar albums:

- 2008 - Mater's Car Tunes
- 2008 - Ratatouille What's Cooking?
- 2006 - Disney's Beach Party
- 2005 - Lightnin' McQueen's Fast Tracks
- 2004 - Finding Nemo Ocean Favorites

=== Songwriter ===
As a songwriter, Mollin has written or co-written songs for Cher, Eddie Money, Burning Rome, Toronto, Shania Twain, Stan Meissner, and others.

== Awards and nominations ==
Year	Nominee / work	Award	Result
2007	Jesus Take the Wheel (Passing Stranger Music Publishing)	ASCAP - Publisher of the Year	Won
2006	Jesus Take the Wheel (Passing Stranger Music Publishing)	ASCAP - Publisher of the Year	Won
2000	Sending You a Little Christmas - Johnny Mathis	SOCAN - Film TV Award	Nominated
1994	The Passion - Beyond Reality	Gemini Award - Best Original Musical Score for Television	Won
1984	Rugrat Rock	Juno Award - Best Children's Album	Won
1982	Only the Lucky - Lodi - Ronnie Hawkins	Juno Award - Producer of the Year	Nominated
1979	Frozen in the Night - Dan Hill	Juno Award - Producer of the Year	Nominated
1978	Sometimes When We Touch - Dan Hill	Juno Award - Producer of the Year (Single)	Won
1978	Longer Fuse - Dan Hill	Juno Award - Producer of the Year (Single)	Won
1978	Sometimes When We Touch - Dan Hill	Juno Award - Producer of the Year (Single)	Won
1978	Longer Fuse - Dan Hill	Juno Award - Producer of the Year (Album)	Won
1976	Santa Jaws - Fred Mollin/Homemade Television	Juno Award - Producer of the Year	Nominated

== Discography ==
- 2026 - Jimmy Webb - Yours for the Taking: The Found Songs of Jimmy Webb - producer
- 2020 - Rumer - Nashville Tears - producer
- 2020 - Rena Strober - Imagine That! - producer
- 2020 - Michelle Creber - Storm - producer
- 2020 - Mandy Barnett - A Nashville Songbook - producer
- 2020 - Mandy Barnett - Help Me Make it Through the Night - producer, guitar, percussion
- 2020 - Lisa Mills - The Triangle - producer, guitar, percussion, photography
- 2019 - Bat McGrath - Bat McGrath - co-producer
- 2019 - Brook Moriber - Steal the Thunder - producer
- 2019 - Fred Mollin - Fast Company (soundtrack) - producer, vocals, guitar, score, composer
- 2019 - Fred Mollin - Sogni D'Oro (Italian version of Disney's Lullaby) - primary artist
- 2019 - The Ides of March - Play On - producer, Hammond B3, Harmonica, Harpsichord
- 2019 - Mandy Barnett - The End of the World - producer
- 2019 - Jared Weiss - Isolated Thunderstorms - producer
- 2018 - Matthew McCauley - Signals Through Noise (produced w Matthew McCauley and Andrew Hermant)
- 2018 - Danny Kortchmar - Honey Don't Leave L.A. co-producer
- 2018 - Michelle Creber - On Display - producer
- 2018 - Rob Galbraith - Where I've Been - executive producer, curator
- 2017 - Carter Beckworth - Stand Up - producer
- 2017 - Annie Bonsignore - Durban Girl - producer
- 2017 - Amanda McBroom - Voices - producer, guitar
- 2017 - Barry Mann and Cynthia Weil - Demos, Live Performances and Rarities - executive producer, curator
- 2017 - Shai Littlejohn - Battleground - producer
- 2016 - Jo Harman - People We Become - producer
- 2016 - Jim Peterik - The Songs - producer, guitar, harmonica, percussion, vocals (background)
- 2016 - Amy Holland - Light On My Path - producer
- 2915 - Peter Oyole - When the Wide World Roars - producer
- 2015 - Matteo Setti - producer
- 2015 - Lexi Walker - Merry Christmas - producer, Arranger, guitar (acoustic), percussion
- 2014 - Engelbert Humperdinck - A Certain Smile (Johnny Mathis Duet) - vocal producer
- 2014 - Fred Mollin - Martha's Vineyards Lullaby Album artist, composer, producer
- 2013 - Tenille Townes - Light - producer, guitar (acoustic), guitar (electric), synthesizer, percussion, vocals (background), composer
- 2013 - Johnny Mathis - Sending You a Little Christmas - producer, guitar (acoustic), guitar (electric), Keyboards, percussion, vocals (background)
- 2013 - Jimmy Webb - Still Within the Sound of My Voice - producer, guitar (electric), organ, synthesizer, percussion, vocals (background)
- 2013 - Carter Beckworth - Humble Pie - producer
- 2013 - Jim Brickman - The Magic of Christmas - producer, "Sending You a Little Christmas"
- 2012 - Rita Wilson - AM/FM - producer, guitar, guitar (12 string acoustic), guitar (acoustic), percussion
- 2013 - Dan Hill - Intimate - co-producer
- 2012 - Pan Am: Music from and Inspired by the Original Series - producer, "Do You Want To Know a Secret?"
- 2012 - Barbra Streisand - Try To Win a Friend - additional production
- 2012 - Disney's Songs And Story: Finding Nemo - composer, producer
- 2012 - Johnny Mathis - The Complete Christmas Collection 1958-2010 - producer of "What a Wonderful World"
- 2011 - JD Souther - Natural History - producer
- 2011 - America - Back Pages - producer, guitar (12 string acoustic), synthesizer, percussion, vocals (background)
- 2011 - Tenille Townes - Real - producer
- 2011 - Ronnie Hawkins - The Ballads of Ronnie Hawkins - producer, various tracks
- 2011 - Johnny Mathis - The Ultimate Collection - multiple producers
- 2011 - Manny Pacquiao (featuring Dan Hill) - Sometimes When We Touch - co-producer
- 2010 - Jimmy Webb - Just Across the River - producer, guitar (electric), Harmonica, synthesizer, percussion, vocals (background)
- 2010 - Frank Hernandez - Since You've Gone - producer
- 2010 - Johnny Mathis - Let It Be Me: Mathis in Nashville - producer, guitar (acoustic), sitar (electric), percussion, arranger
- 2010 - Lewis Moorman - Extended Play - producer
- 2010 - Jason Herndon - producer
- 2010 - Shannon Micol - No More Cinderella - producer
- 2010 - Steve Johannnesen - All the Right Reasons - producer
- 2010 - Playhouse Disney: Let's Dance - composer, producer, "Rollin"
- 2010 - Paul Quarrington -Are You Ready? - producer
- 2009 - 10th Concession - producer
- 2009 - Mater's Car Tunes - producer, songwriter, guitar
- 2009 - Los Lobos - Rolling Handy Manny Soundtrack - songwriter
- 2008 - Billy Ray Cyrus and Miley Cyrus - Ready Set Don’t Go - producer
- 2008 - Billy Ray Cyrus and Miley Cyrus - Ready Set Don’t Go - producer
- 2008 - Disney Adventures In Bluegrass - producer, autoharp
- 2008 - Disney Doubles: Cars - composer, primary artist
- 2008 - Disneymania, Vol. 6 - executive producer
- 2008 - Disney's Handy Manny - composer, producer
- 2008 - Horror Tracks: The Scariest Horror-Soundtracks - composer, primary artist
- 2008 - Danny Kortchmar and Immediate Family - Honey Don't Leave L.A. - co-producer with Danny Kortchmar and Steve Postell
- 2008 - Lilo and Stitch Hawaiian, Vol. 2 Disney - producer
- 2008 - ABC's Love Affair - executive producer
- 2008 - Sleepytime Lullabies (Nickelodeon) - producer, arranger
- 2007 - A Disney Channel Holiday - producer, executive producer
- 2007 - Fred Mollin Christmas Lullaby - primary artist
- 2007 - Disneymania 5 - executive producer
- 2007 - Everlife - Everlife - producer, guitar, executive producer
- 2007 - Disney Channel Family Holiday - producer, executive producer
- 2007 - Country Superstarz - various artists - producer
- 2007 - Hallelujah Country - producer, arranger, guitar (acoustic), guitar (12 string acoustic), Banjo
- 2007 - High School Musical: Hits Collection (box set) - executive producer
- 2007 - High School Musical: The Concert - executive producer
- 2007 - Billy Ray Cyrus - Home at Last - producer, guitar (12 string acoustic), synthesizer, vocals (background), organ (Hammond)
- 2007 - The Cheetah Girls - In Concert: The Party's Just Begun Tour - audio production, executive producer
- 2007 - Jump In! - executive producer
- 2007 - Jimmy Webb - Live and At Large - producer
- 2007 - Pixar Buddy Songs - (Disney) - producer, composer, primary artist
- 2007 - T-Squad - T-Squad - executive producer
- 2007 - Radio Disney Jams, Vol. 9 (Disney) - executive producer
- 2007 - Ratatouille: What's Cooking? (Disney) - composer, primary artist, co-producer
- 2006 - Cars: Lightning McQueen's Fast Tracks (Disney) - producer, primary artist, composer
- 2006 - Fred Mollin - More Music from Forever Knight - primary artist, arranger, producer
- 2006 - Tennessee River Authority - Ramblin' Roads: A Bluegrass Collection producer
- 2006 - Jennifer Clarke - Just About Gone - producer
- 2006 - America - Silent Letter/Alibi - co-producer, guitar (acoustic), percussion, vocals (background)
- 2005 - Disney's Beach Party (Disney's Karaoke Series) - co-producer, vocals
- 2005 - Disney's Beach Party (Disney) - producer, vocals, guitar (acoustic), guitar (electric), primary artist
- 2005 - Fred Mollin - Disney's Lullaby Album, Vol. 2 - primary artist, producer, arranger, performer, musician
- 2005 - Fred Mollin - Friday the 13th, Pts. 7 & 8 (soundtrack) - composer, producer
- 2005 - Collin Raye - Hurricane Jane - producer
- 2005 - Collin Raye - I Know That's Right - producer
- 2005 - Lilo & Stitch 2: Island Favorites (Disney) - producer
- 2005 - John Landry - Someday - producer
- 2005 - Collin Raye - Twenty Years and Change - producer, guitar (acoustic)
- 2005 - Jimmy Webb - Twilight of the Renegades - producer, various tracks
- 2004 - Disney's Lullaby & Goodnight - producer, arranger, musician, primary artist
- 2004 - Gordie Sampson - Sunburn - executive producer
- 2004 - Kris Kristofferson - The Essential - producer on "Please Don't Tell Me How the Story Ends"
- 2004 - Rob Galbraith - Too Long at the Fair - producer
- 2004 - Louise Pitre - Shattered - producer
- 2003 - Bluegrass: American Classics - producer, arranger, autoharp
- 2003 - Nell Bryden - Day for Night - producer, guitar (acoustic), guitar (electric), composer
- 2003 - Disney's Christmas Lullaby Album (Disney) - producer, arranger, musician, composer, guitar, primary artist
- 2003 - Finding Nemo: Ocean Favorites (Disney) - producer, arranger, conductor, guitar, theremin, primary artist
- 2003 - O Mickey, Where Art Thou? (Disney) - producer, compilation producer, guitar (acoustic), autoharp
- 2003 - Sounds of Wood and Steel, Vol. 3 - producer of "You Just Missed Me" - producer, composer, artist, musician
- 2003 - Janey Street - Street Less Traveled - producer, guitar (acoustic)
- 2002 - Lilo & Stitch: Island Favorites (Disney) - producer, various tracks
- 2002 - Disney's Princess Lullaby Album - producer, musician, composer, primary artist
- 2001 - America - Definitive America - co-producer, guitar, percussion, various tracks
- 2000 - Fred Mollin - Disney's Lullaby Album: Gentle Instrumental Favorites for Babies - primary artist, producer, arranger, performer, musician
- 2000 - America - Highway: 30 Years of America - co-producer, guitar, percussion, various tracks
- 2000 - Barry Mann - Soul & Inspiration - producer, guitar (acoustic), guitar (electric), celeste, sampled strings
- 1999 - Frank Stallone - In Love in Vain - co-producer
- 1999 - Dan Hill - Love of My Life: The Best of Dan Hill - co-producer, various tracks
- 1999 More Music from Forever Knight (original soundtrack) - producer, liner notes, performer, composer
- 1999 - Amanda McBroom - Portraits: Best Of Amanda McBroom - compilation producer, producer of various tracks
- 1999 - Superstar (original soundtrack) - co-producer of "Sometimes When We Touch"
- 1999 - Kris Kristofferson - The Austin Sessions - producer, musician
- 1998 - Barney - Barney's Great Adventure - co-producer, various tracks
- 1998 - Sci-Fi's Greatest Hits, Vol. 1: Final Frontiers - composer, various tracks
- 1998 - Sci-Fi's Greatest Hits, Vol. 2: Dark Side - composer, various tracks
- 1998 - Sci-Fi's Greatest Hits, Vol. 3: Uninvited - composer, various tracks
- 1997 - Fantastic Television!! - composer, various tracks
- 1997 - Michael McDonald & Amy Holland - Men Are from Mars, Women Are from Venus - producer of "All I Know"
- 1997 - Fred Mollin - Deepwater Black (soundtrack) - composer, performer, producer
- 1997 - Vampire Themes - composer, various tracks
- 1996 - Fred Mollin - Forever Knight (original TV soundtrack) - primary artist, producer, composer
- 1996 - Jimmy Webb - Ten Easy Pieces - producer, guitar (acoustic), autoharp, vocals (background)
- 1995 - Vineyard Sound, Vol. 2 - Last Boat Home - producer, composer, artist, musician
- 1994 - Super Scary Monster Party (various artists) - producer, composer, artist
- 1994 - The Essential Vampire Theme Collection - producer
- 1994 - Dan Hill - Let Me Show You: Greatest Hits & More - co-producer, various tracks
- 1994 - One Life to Live: The Best of Love (original TV soundtrack) - producer
- 1993 - The Vineyard Sound, Vol. 1 - Katama Meditation Instrumental Track - composer, artist
- 1990 - Frank Stallone - Day In Day Out - co-producer
- 1986 - Eddie Money - Can't Hold Back - songwriter, "One Chance"
- 1983 - Toronto - Girls Night Out - songwriter, "(Don't Give Me The) Once Over"
- 1982 - Jimmy Webb - Angel Heart - co-producer, guitar, vocals (background), percussion
- 1981 - America - Alibi - co-producer, guitar (acoustic), percussion, vocals (background)
- 1980 - Michael Stanley Band - Heartland - Mixing
- 1980 - Marc Tanner / Marc Tanner Band - Temptation - producer
- 1980 - Blaise Tosti - American Lovers - producer
- 1979 - Bishop & Gwinn - This Is Our Night - co-producer, guitar, percussion
- 1979 - Randy Edelman - You're the One - co-producer, percussion, vocals (background)
- 1978 - McCluskey - GRT - co-producer
- 1978 - Dan Hill - Frozen in the Night - producer, guitar (acoustic), percussion, vocals (background)
- 1978 - Bat McGrath - The Spy - co-producer, vocals, guitar, percussion, vocals (background)
- 1977 - Bat McGrath - From the Blue Eagle - co-producer, vocals, guitar, percussion
- 1978 - Ronney Abramson - Jukebox of Paris - co-producer, 6 tracks
- 1977 - Dan Hill - Longer Fuse - producer, vocals, guitar, percussion, vocals (background)
- 1977 - Ronney Abramson - Stowaway (True North) - co-producer
- 1976 - Dan Hill - Hold On - producer, vocals, guitar, percussion, vocals (background)
- 1976 - Paul Clinch & Choya - Living Like a Rich Man - guitar
- 1975 - CB Victoria - Dawning Day - co-producer
- 1974 - Dan Hill - Dan Hill - producer, guitar, vocals
- 1972 - Marc Jonson - Years - drums, vocals (background)
- 1971 - Ellen Warshaw - Ellen Warshaw - co-writer of 2 tracks, acoustic guitar

== Filmography ==
- 2017 - The Lears (film) (music supervisor)
- 2011 - Manny Pacquiao (featuring Dan Hill): Sometimes When We Touch (video documentary short) (music producer)
- 2002 - Mad Dog Prosecutors (documentary) (composer)
- 2000-2001 - In a Heartbeat (TV series) (21 episodes) (composer)
- 2001 - Borderline Normal
- 2000 - Daydream Believers: The Monkees' Story (TV movie) (original score) (music supervisor)
- 2000 - Pilgrim (film)
- 1999 - Thrill Seekers (TV movie)
- 1999 - The Fall (film) (composer)
- 1999 - Roswell: The Aliens Attack (TV movie) (composer)
- 1999 - Family of Cops III: Under Suspicion (TV movie)
- 1998 - Dream House (TV movie) (composer)
- 1998 - White Lies (TV movie) (music supervisor) (composer)
- 1997 - Freaky Stories (TV series) (1 episode) (composer)
- 1997 - Field Trip/The Story/Panty Raid/The Experiment (1997) (segment: "The Experiment") (composer)
- 1997 - Mission Genesis (TV series) (13 episodes) (composer)
- 1997 - Big Guns Talk: The Story of the Western (TV movie documentary) (composer)
- 1996-1997 - Beverly Hills, 90210 (TV series) (11 episodes) (composer)
- 1996 - The Abduction (TV movie) (composer)
- 1992-1996 - Forever Knight (TV series) (70 episodes) (composer)
- 1994-1996 - TekWar (TV series) (18 episodes) (composer)
- 1995 - Little Criminals (TV movie) (music score) (music supervisor)
- 1995 - Haunted Lives: True Ghost Stories (TV miniseries documentary) (1 episode) (composer)
- 1995 - Blind Faith (composer: theme music)
- 1995 - Baby Baby (composer: theme music) (musician)
- 1995 - The Outer Limits (TV series) (2 episodes) (Composer)
- 1995 - Hangtime (TV series) (composer - 1 episode)
- 1995 - Pilot (composer: theme music)
- 1994 - Gene Autry, Melody of the West (documentary) (composer)
- 1994 - The Odyssey (TV series) (13 episodes) (composer)
- 1993 - Phenom (TV series) (1 episode) (composer)
- 1993 - Liar, Liar: Between Father and Daughter (TV movie) (composer)
- 1993 - In Advance of the Landing (documentary) (composer)
- 1993 - Survive the Night (TV movie) (composer)
- 1992 - Amy Fisher: My Story (TV movie) (composer)
- 1991-1992 - Beyond Reality (TV series) (44 episodes) (composer)
- 1991-1993 - Tropical Heat aka Sweating Bullets (TV series) (theme song, composer, 13 episodes)
- 1991 - Revenge of the Nerds (TV Short) (composer: theme music)
- 1990 - Whispers (composer)
- 1987-1990 - Friday the 13th: The Series (TV series) (72 episodes) (composer)
- 1989 - My Secret Identity (TV series) (44 episodes) (composer)
- 1989 - War of the Worlds (TV series) (composer - 6 episodes, 1989–1990)
- 1989 - Friday the 13th Part VIII: Jason Takes Manhattan (composer)
- 1989 - Where the Spirit Lives (recording supervisor: Toronto) (composer)
- 1989 - CBS Summer Playhouse (TV series) (music performer - 1 episode) (composer)
- 1988-1989 - Ramona (TV series) (10 episodes) (composer)
- 1988 - Family Reunion (composer)
- 1988 - Friday the 13th Part VII: The New Blood (composer)
- 1987-1988 - The New Gidget (TV series) (40 episodes) (composer)
- 1988 - The Ray Bradbury Theater (TV series) (1 episode) (composer)
- 1987 - First Offender (TV movie) (composer)
- 1987 - It's Only Rock & Roll (TV series) (musical director) (co-host) (14 episodes) (composer)
- 1985-1987 - ABC Afterschool Special (TV series) (2 episodes) (composer)
- 1987 - Really Weird Tales (TV movie) (segment composer: "Cursed with Charisma") (composer: theme song written by Fred Mollin)
- 1987 - The Hanoi Hilton (music producer)
- 1986 - Brothers by Choice (TV movie) (composer)
- 1986 - The Truth About Alex (TV movie) (composer)
- 1985 - Screwballs II (composer)
- 1984 - Hockey Night (TV movie) (composer)
- 1982 - Spring Fever (composer)
- 1982 - Marva Collins: Excellence in Education (TV short documentary) (composer)
- 1982 - Heart of Gold (TV movie documentary) (composer: theme music)
- 1980 - The Dream Never Dies (documentary) (composer)
- 1979 - Fast Company (songs and music score)
- 1977-1978 - Homemade Television (TV series) (3 seasons) (actor, composer, musician)
- 1977 - Valdy Down Home Special (TV special) (actor, composer, musician)
