= Dance of Love =

Studio album by Dan Hill
- Released: November 12, 1991
- Studio: Digital Sound Recording, Novel Park Studios, Sounds Interchange and Maclear Studios (Toronto, Ontario, Canada); Winfield Sound (Weston, Ontario, Canada); Music Grinder Studios (Hollywood, California, USA); Track Record Studios and Ameraycan Studios (North Hollywood, California, USA); Ground Control Studios (Santa Monica, California, USA); Red Zone Studios (Burbank, California, USA); Soundcastle Recorders (Los Angeles, California, USA); Secret Sound (South Pacific)
- Genre: Pop; soft rock
- Length: 49:55
- Label: Quality Records
- Producer: Charles Judge (tracks 1, 3 & 11); Dan Hill and John Sheard (tracks 2, 4, 5, 7–9 & 12); Doug James (tracks 2, 4, 5, 8 & 12); Chas Sandford (track 6), Humberto Gatica and Rick Hahn (track 10)

Dan Hill chronology
Real Love (1989)	Dance of Love (1991)	Let Me Show You: Greatest Hits and More... (1993)

Dance of Love is the tenth studio album by Canadian musician Dan Hill, released in November 1991. Its two singles, "I Fall All Over Again" and "Hold Me Now" were both top 30 hits on the U.S. Billboard Adult Contemporary chart, peaking at numbers 7 and 30, respectively.

== Track listing ==
No.	Title	Writer(s)	Length
1.	"I Miss You Still"	Dan Hill, Charles Judge	4:20
2.	"I Fall All Over Again"	Hill, Doug James	4:21
3.	"Is It Really Love?"	Hill, Judge	3:51
4.	"Sorry"	Hill, James	4:12
5.	"Dance of Love"	Hill, James	3:27
6.	"Am I Fooling Myself"	Hill, Terry Britten, Chas Sandford	4:47
7.	"Hold Me Now"	Hill, John Sheard	3:32
8.	"Flirting with a Heartache"	Hill, James, Sheard	4:26
9.	"Don't Give Up on Us"	Hill, Sheard	4:06
10.	"Through It All"	Hill, Rick Haun	3:22
11.	"Losing You"	Hill, Judge	5:11
12.	"Sometimes Love Is Not Enough"	Hill, Sheard	4:00

== Personnel ==
- Dan Hill – lead and backing vocals, BGV arrangements (3)
- Charles Judge – keyboards (1, 3, 6, 11), drum programming (3, 6, 11), bass programming (11)
- Doug James – keyboards (2, 4, 5, 7, 8, 12), drum programming (2, 4, 5, 8, 12), string arrangements (4, 7), acoustic piano (8), bass (8, 12)
- John Sheard – keyboards (2, 5, 9, 12), string arrangements (2, 5, 8, 9), BGV arrangements (3, 4), backing vocals (4), organ (8), horns (8), bass (9, 12), drum programming (9)
- Claude Gaudette – keyboards (10)
- Rick Haun – keyboards (10), drum programming (10), arrangements (10)
- Tony Smith – programming (10)
- Ron Kormie – guitars (1, 3)
- Michael Landau – guitars (2, 4, 7)
- Rob Piltch – guitars (2, 5)
- Chas Sandford – acoustic guitar (6), electric guitar (6), "Cyclorama" guitar (6)
- Asher Horowitz – guitars (8)
- Chris Yost – guitars (9)
- Dean Parks – acoustic guitar (10)
- Michael Thompson – electric guitar (10), guitars (11)
- John Pierce – bass (1, 3)
- Nathan East – bass (2, 4, 7)
- Neil Stubenhaus – bass (5, 10)
- Jerry Watts Jr. – bass (6)
- Chris Ross – drums (1)
- Kevan McKenzie – additional drums (2, 5)
- Carlos Vega – additional drums (2, 4), drums (7)
- Paulinho da Costa – percussion (10)
- Carol Nathan – string arrangements (4, 7)
- Cherie Camp – backing vocals (4)
- Shirley Eikhard – backing vocals (4)
- Ross Harwood – backing vocals (4)
- John Lowery – backing vocals (4)
- Rique Franks – lead vocals (7)
- Deborah Cox – backing vocals (8)
- Dawn Cumberbund – backing vocals (8)

== Production ==
- Dan Hill – executive producer
- Charles Judge – engineer (1, 3)
- Nick Didia – engineer (1), mix assistant (11)
- Rob Jacobs – engineer (1), mixing (1, 3, 11)
- Hugh Cooper – engineer (2, 4, 5, 7–9, 12)
- Elliot Solomon – engineer (2–5, 7, 11)
- Doug James – engineer (4)
- Chas Sandford – engineer (6), mixing (6)
- Paul Shubat – engineer (8)
- Noel Golden – engineer (9)
- Humberto Gatica – mixing (2, 4, 5, 7, 10), engineer (10)
- Earl Torino – mixing (8, 12)
- Lenny Derose – mixing (9)
- Casey McMackin – assistant engineer (1, 3)
- Mark Spiteri – assistant engineer (5)
- Jeff Robinson – assistant engineer (6)
- Andrew King – assistant engineer (11)
- Dave Lopez – mix assistant (1), assistant engineer (6, 11)
- Alejandro Rodriguez – mix assistant (2, 4, 5, 7), assistant engineer (10)
- Eric Apps – mix assistant (8)
- Paul Seeley – mix assistant (9)
- George Marino – mastering at Sterling Sound (New York City, New York, USA)
- Candy Capek – production coordinator (5, 7)
- Hugh Syme – art direction, design
- Lori Stoll – photography
- Howard Rosen – management
