= Carter Beckworth =

American singer-songwriter and musician

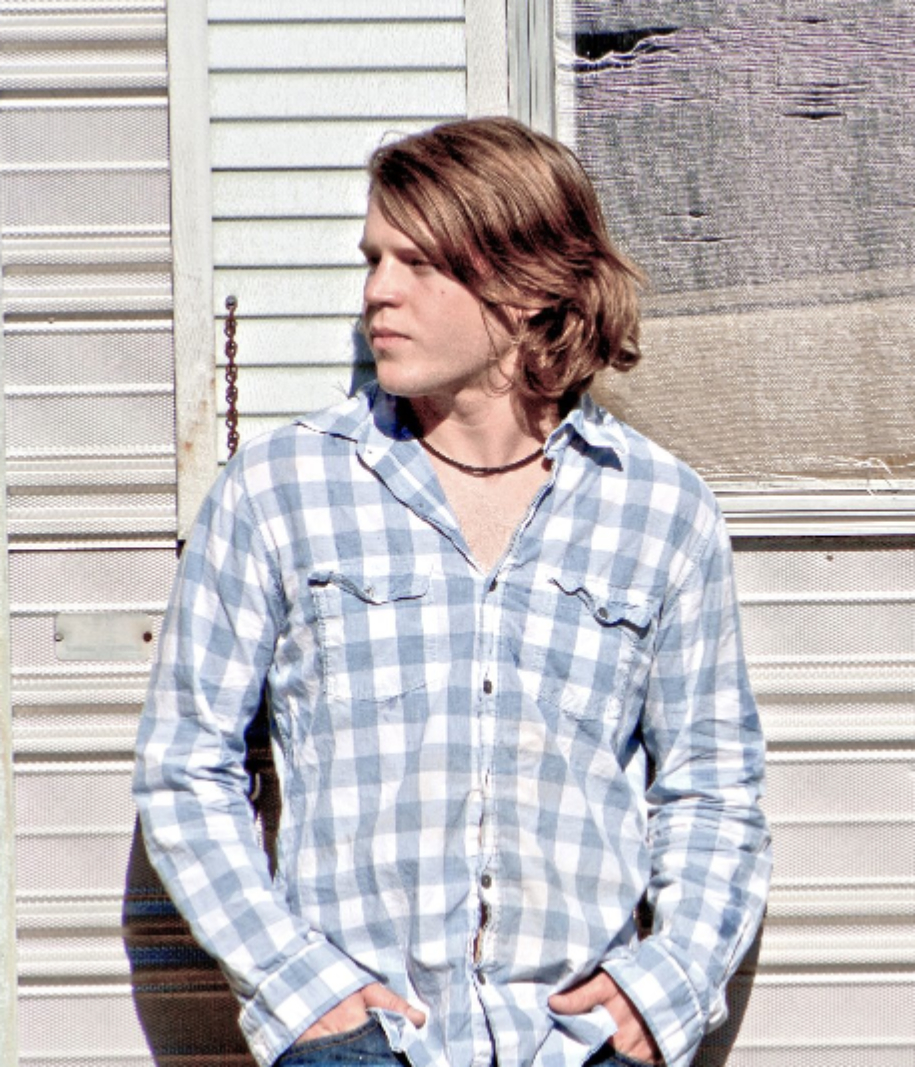
- Carter Hobby Beckworth

Background information
- Born: 1986 (age 39–40); Houston, Texas, United States
- Origin: Austin, Texas, United States
- Genres: Rock, singer-songwriter
- Instruments: Guitar, vocals
- Years active: 2004–present
- Label: Cypress Creek Records
- Website: carterbeckworth.com

Carter Hobby Beckworth (born 1986 in Houston, Texas) is an American singer-songwriter and musician who resides in Santa Fe, New Mexico and is known for his unique style, combining rock, R&B and electronic elements. He has released five solo albums since 2007, and he is also the lead vocalist of the rock band Baker Hotel, with whom he has released two albums.

== Early career ==
Beckworth has been writing songs and singing since the age of 12. He started playing professionally when he was a student at the University of Mississippi in Oxford, Mississippi. It was here that he released his debut solo album, Fairweather Grace, in 2007. Beckworth returned to Texas to attend St. Edward's University. After a year, Beckworth transferred to University of Texas at Austin where he graduated in 2010 with a degree in English and a minor in Spanish. He later took a job as a fishing guide in Alaska, and performed his music for the guests at the lodge where he worked.

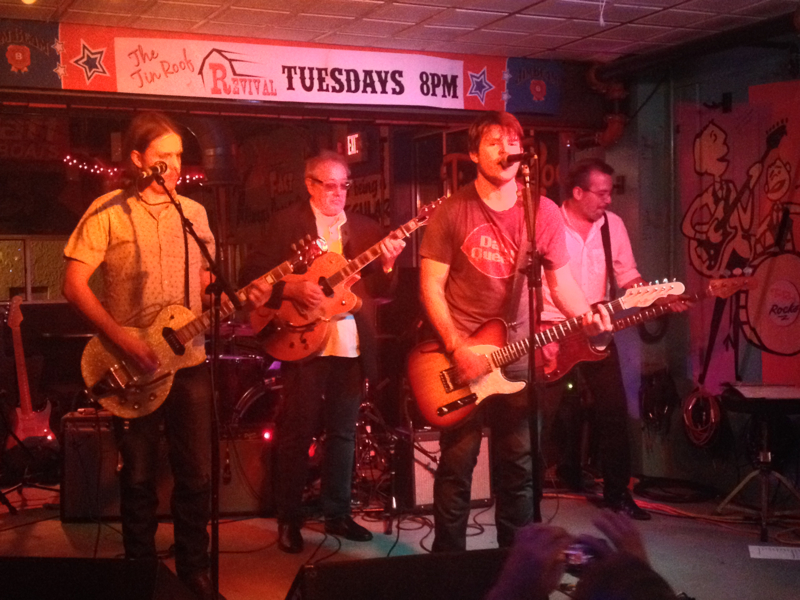
Carter Beckworth performs with producer Fred Mollin at the Tin Roof in Nashville, Tennessee in 2013.

Beckworth's name is known to fans of the hit single, "Mabel", which played on over 200 radio stations and was selected to appear in two independent films.

== Baker Hotel ==
While Beckworth was in Austin from 2008 until he graduated from UT Austin in 2010, he studied full-time and also performed as frontman for the rock band Baker Hotel, whose sound was called reminiscent of ground-breakers like Pearl Jam, ZZ Top, and Guns N' Roses. The band released two albums – Baker Hotel (Independent) in 2008 and Hard To Prove (Revolution Records) in 2010.

== Touring ==
Beckworth has toured in more than 30 states around the United States and Canada, and has shared the stage with performers such as Randy Rogers Band, Carolyn Wonderland, Bob Schneider, Bruce Robison, Black Oak Arkansas, Mike McClure, Micky & the Motorcars, Ryan Bingham, Hayes Carll, Cory Morrow and Pat Green, as well as noted country musician Radney Foster.

== Songwriting ==
As a songwriter, Beckworth writes almost all of his own material, and contributed six songs to Texas music star Cory Morrow's 2015 album 'The Good Fight.'

== Discography ==
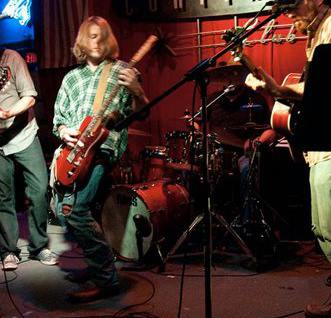
Carter Beckworth performs live at the Continental Club in Houston, Texas

=== Albums ===
Title	Year	Artist Name	Label	Producer
Fairweather Grace	2007	Carter Beckworth	Independent	Carter Beckworth
Baker Hotel	2008	Baker Hotel	Independent	Baker Hotel
Hard To Prove	2010	Baker Hotel	Revolution Records	Hunt Sales (Iggy Pop, David Bowie)
Carter Beckworth	2011	Carter Beckworth	Revolution Records	Chris Rockaway
Humble Heart	2013	Carter Beckworth	Cypress Creek Records	Fred Mollin (Sheryl Crow, Chris Cornell, Billy Joel)
Speak Up	2017	Carter Beckworth	Cypress Creek Records	Fred Mollin
pocketknife	2021	Carter Beckworth	Independent	Fred Mollin

== See also ==
- Music of Austin
