= I Fall All Over Again =

Single by Dan Hill

from the album Dance of Love
- B-side: "Don't Give Up on Us"
- Released: 1991
- Genre: Soft rock
- Length: 4:21
- Label: Quality Records, Pump Records
- Songwriter(s): Dan Hill, Doug James
- Producer(s): Dan Hill, Doug James

Dan Hill singles chronology
"Wishful Thinking" (1989)	"I Fall All Over Again" (1991)	"Hold Me Now" (1992)

"I Fall All Over Again" is a song by Canadian singer-songwriter Dan Hill, released as a single in 1991. It was the first single released from his tenth studio album, Dance of Love. The song reached No. 7 on the U.S. Billboard Adult Contemporary chart in early 1992. It was Hill's last of seven top 10 U.S. AC chart hits.

== Charts ==
=== Weekly charts ===
Chart (1992)	Peak position
US Adult Contemporary (Billboard)	7

=== Year-end charts ===
Chart (1992)	Position
US Adult Contemporary (Billboard)	43
