= Never Thought (That I Could Love) =

1987 song by Canadian singer-songwriter Dan Hill

Single by Dan Hill

from the album Dan Hill
- B-side: "Blood in My Veins"
- Released: 1987
- Genre: Soft rock
- Length: 3:32
- Label: Columbia
- Songwriter: Dan Hill
- Producers: Hank Medress, John Capek

Dan Hill singles chronology
"Can't We Try" (1987)	"Never Thought (That I Could Love)" (1987)	"Carmelia" (1988)

"Never Thought (That I Could Love)" is a song by Canadian singer-songwriter Dan Hill, released in 1987 as the second single from his eponymous eighth studio album, Dan Hill. In Canada, the song reached No. 22 and No. 1 on its Adult Contemporary chart. In the U.S., it reached No. 43 on the Billboard Hot 100 and No. 2 on the Adult Contemporary chart.

== Chart performance ==
Chart (1987)	Peak position
Canada (RPM 100)	22
Canada (RPM Adult Contemporary)	8
US Billboard Hot 100	43
US Billboard Adult Contemporary	2
