= Vonda Shepard =

American singer (born 1963)

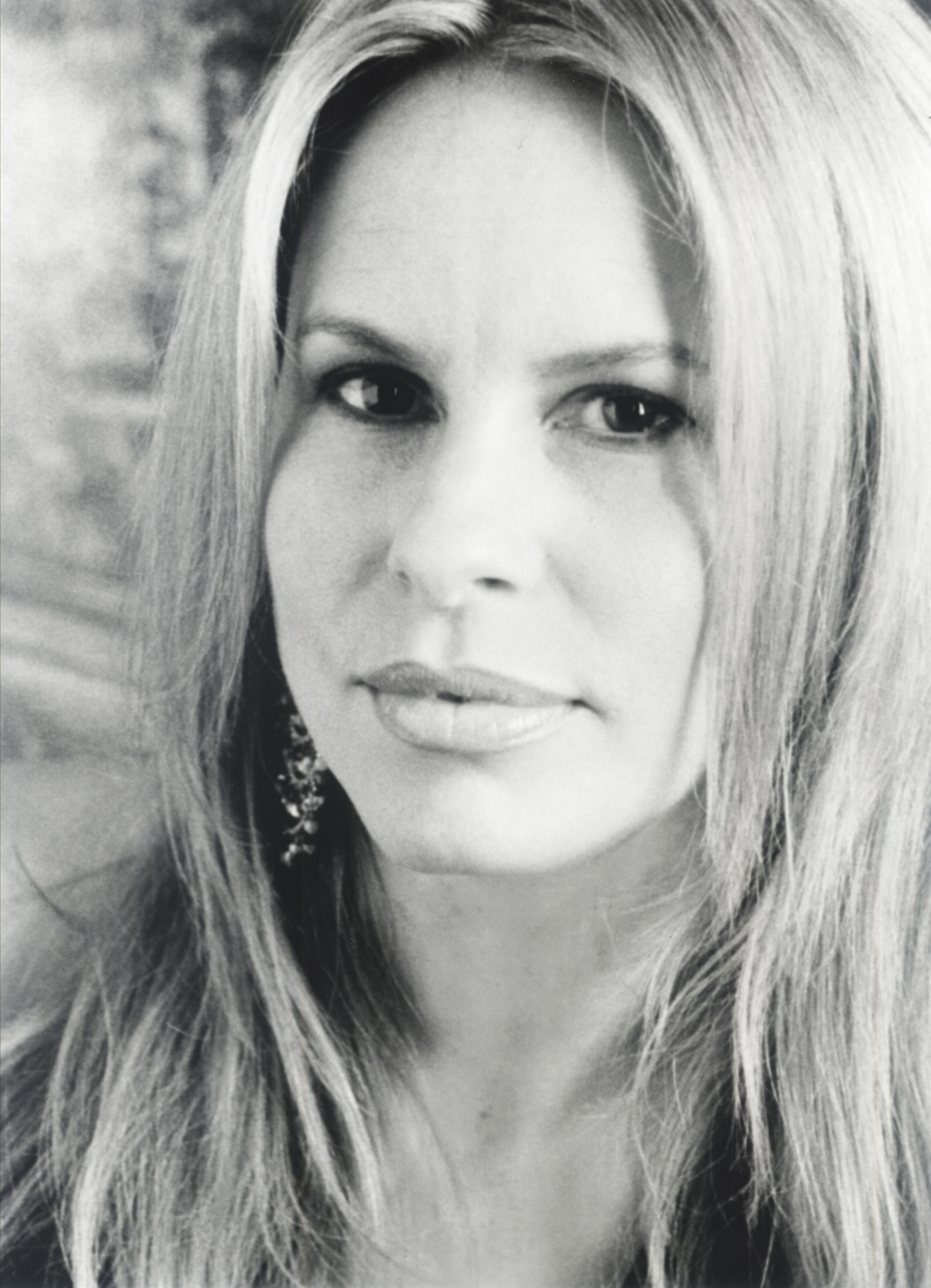

Background information
- Born: July 7, 1963 (age 63); New York City, U.S.
- Origin: California, U.S.
- Genres: Pop; soft rock; soul
- Occupations: Singer; pianist; songwriter; actress
- Instruments: Vocals; piano; guitar; bass guitar
- Years active: 1987–present
- Labels: Reprise/Warner Bros. Records; 550 Music/Epic/SME Records; VesperAlley Records
- Website: vondashepard.com

Vonda Shepard (born July 7, 1963) is an American singer, songwriter, music director, and actress. She is best known for her supporting role as a fictionalized version of herself on the television series Ally McBeal (1997–2002), for which she recorded five soundtrack albums as well as the series' theme song "Searchin' My Soul", which saw international commercial success. Shepard has otherwise released nine studio albums and three live albums. She received a Screen Actors Guild Award as a cast member of Ally McBeal in 1999 among two additional nominations, and received a Billboard award for selling the most television soundtrack albums in history.

== Life and career ==
Vonda Shepard was born in New York City in 1963. Her family relocated to California when she was a child, and she played piano from an early age. Her father was Richmond Shepard, a mime and improvisational actor. She has three sisters. After performing as a backup singer, Shepard received her own recording contract and made her first chart appearance in 1987 with her duet with Dan Hill, "Can't We Try." Her self-titled debut studio album followed in 1989. It saw the moderate commercial success of the single "Don't Cry Ilene", which peaked at number 17 on the Billboard Hot Adult Contemporary chart and remained there for 12 weeks.

While promoting her third studio album It's Good, Eve (1996), Shepard performed at the Key Club in Hollywood, California, and at one point she invited Michelle Pfeiffer and her husband David E. Kelley to come watch her perform. Kelley decided during the performance that he wanted Shepard to record the soundtrack for his forthcoming television series Ally McBeal, having been looking for a singer to be the voice and inner thoughts of the character. Her biggest commercial success while starring on the series was the theme song "Searchin' My Soul", an original selection that originally appeared on her second studio album The Radical Light (1992), jointly written and composed by Shepard and Paul Howard Gordon. Her version of Kay Starr's Christmas classic "(Everybody's Waitin' for) The Man with the Bag", after it was featured on a season 4 episode of Ally McBeal, became a popular holiday song.

Shepard went on to record four soundtrack albums and one compilation album for Ally McBeal. Additionally, she released nine solo studio albums and three live albums to date. She married music producer Mitchell Froom in 2004; they had their first child in 2006. In 2010, she provided vocals for "I Need You," whose music had been composed by James Newton Howard, for the film Love & Other Drugs.

== Discography ==
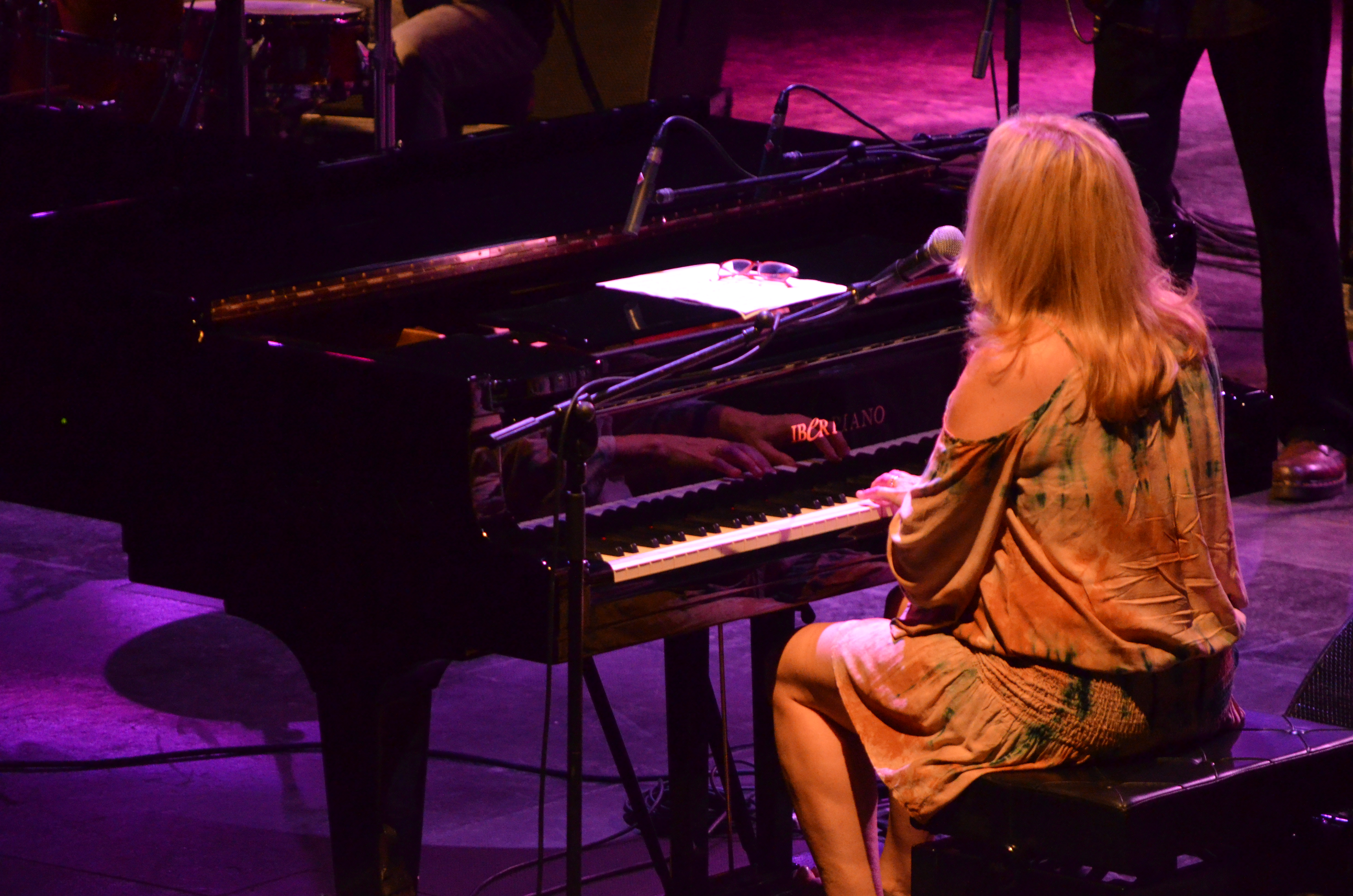
Vonda Shepard's concert at International Jazz Festival of San Javier (June 2018)

=== Albums ===
==== Studio albums ====
Year	Title	Release date	Label	Peak chart positions	
Year	Title	Release date	Label	AUS	UK
1989	Vonda Shepard	August 1, 1989	Reprise	—	—
1992	The Radical Light	April 8, 1992	Vesper Alley	—	—
1996	It's Good, Eve	January 23, 1996	Vesper Alley	—	—
1999	By 7:30	April 20, 1999	Jacket	96	39
2002	Chinatown	September 24, 2002	Jacket	—	—
2008	From the Sun	September 2, 2008	Bos	—	—
2011	Solo	December 6, 2011	Hotelè/PanShot	—	—
2015	Rookie	July 10, 2015	Hotelè	—	—
2022	Red Light, Green Light	September 21, 2022	Hotelè	—	—
2026	Nine Songs	September 25, 2026	N/A (self-release)	—	—

==== Soundtrack albums ====
Year	Title	Release date	Label	Peak chart positions	
Year	Title	Release date	Label	AUS	UK
1998	Songs from Ally McBeal	May 5, 1998	550	1	3
1999	Heart and Soul: New Songs from Ally McBeal	November 9, 1999	550	17	9
2000	Ally McBeal: A Very Ally Christmas	November 7, 2000	550	—	—
2001	Ally McBeal: For Once in My Life	April 23, 2001	550	5	—
2009	The Best of Ally McBeal: The Songs of Vonda Shepard	October 6, 2009	Legacy	—	—

==== Live albums ====
Year	Title	Release date	Label
2004	Live: A Retrospective	September 1, 2004	Navarre
2010	From the Sun Tour: Live in San Javier	November 2, 2009	Galileo
2019	Vonda: Live	September 6, 2019	Hôtele

=== Singles ===
Year	Song	Chart positions						Album
Year	Song	US AC	AUS	CAN	CAN AC	SPA	UK	Album
1987	"Can't We Try" (Dan Hill and Vonda Shepard)	2	41	14	2	—	—	Dan Hill
1989	"Baby, Don't You Break My Heart Slow"	—	—	—	—	—	—	Vonda Shepard
1989	"I Shy Away"	37	—	—	—	—	—	Vonda Shepard
1990	"Don't Cry Ilene"	17	—	—	—	—	—	Vonda Shepard
1992	"Wake Up the House"	—	—	—	—	—	—	The Radical Light
1998	"Searchin' My Soul"	22	82	6	22	1	10	Songs from Ally McBeal
1998	"Hooked on a Feeling"	—	—	—	—	7	—	Songs from Ally McBeal
1999	"Maryland"	—	—	—	—	—	—	Songs from Ally McBeal
1999	"Tell Him"	—	—	—	—	29	—	Songs from Ally McBeal
1999	"Baby, Don't You Break My Heart Slow" (with Emily Saliers)	21	—	—	8	—	76	Heart and Soul: New Songs from Ally McBeal
1999	"Read Your Mind"	—	—	—	—	—	—	Heart and Soul: New Songs from Ally McBeal
2000	"Someday We'll Be Together"	—	—	—	—	—	—	Heart and Soul: New Songs from Ally McBeal
2001	"Chances Are" (with Robert Downey, Jr.)	—	—	—	—	—	—	Ally McBeal: For Once in My Life
2002	"Rainy Days"	—	—	—	—	—	—	Chinatown
