= By 7:30 =

Studio album by Vonda Shepard
- Released: April 20, 1999
- Label: Jacket
- Producer: Mitchell Froom; Vonda Shepard

Vonda Shepard chronology
Songs from Ally McBeal (1998)	By 7:30 (1999)	Heart and Soul: New Songs from Ally McBeal (1999)

By 7:30 is the fifth album by Vonda Shepard, released on 20 April 1999. The album reached number 39 on the UK Albums Chart.

== Track listing ==
All songs written and composed by Vonda Shepard, except track 8: lyrics by Shepard, music by Shepard and James Newton Howard.

By 7:30 track listing
No.	Title	Length
1.	"By 7:30"	4:05
2.	"Mercy"	4:57
3.	"Clear"	4:04
4.	"Sail on by"	3:59
5.	"Confetti"	3:26
6.	"Cross to Bear"	3:40
7.	"This Is Crazy Now"	3:35
8.	"Baby, Don't You Break My Heart Slow" (duet with Emily Saliers)	4:41
9.	"You and Me"	3:40
10.	"Venus Is Breaking"	4:25
11.	"Newspaper Wife"	4:57
12.	"Soothe Me"	5:04
13.	"Souvenir"	1:54
Total length:		52:27

== Personnel ==
=== Musicians ===
- Vonda Shepard – lead vocals, acoustic piano (1, 3, 6–9, 12, 13), drum programming (1), acoustic guitar (2, 4, 10, 11), backing vocals (3, 4, 5, 7, 9, 10, 11, 13), electric acoustic guitar (5), Wurlitzer organ (9)
- Mitchell Froom – Moog bass (1), Indian harmonium (2), string arrangements (2, 12), keyboards (3, 10), acoustic piano (4), claviola (7, 12), Hammond B3 organ (8), harmonium (9), portative organ (9), optigan (11), "backwards" piano (11), ensemble arrangements (13)
- Charlie Guardino – accordion (13)
- Val McCallum – acoustic guitar (1, 7), 12-string guitar (2, 4), guitars (3, 9), electric guitar (4, 5, 10, 11), balalaika (9), additional acoustic guitar (11)
- Greg Leisz – pedal steel guitar (7)
- Michael Landau – guitars (8)
- Tony Levin – "rubber band" bass (1), bass (3, 9, 10)
- Leland Sklar – bass (2, 7, 8)
- Davey Faragher – bass (4, 8)
- Jim Hanson – bass (5, 11)
- Penny Owsley – bass (11)
- Andy Kamman – drums (2), additional drums (7), percussion (7)
- Jerry Marotta – percussion (1, 10), drums (10)
- Pete Thomas – percussion (2, 8), drums (3, 5, 7, 8, 9, 11), drum loops (3)
- Aaron Heick – clarinet (13)
- Garo Yellin – cello (1, 12, 13)
- Jane Scarpantoni – cello (2, 12)
- David Gold – viola (2, 12)
- Matthew Pierce – viola (2, 12)
- Mark Feldman — violin (2, 12)
- Lorenza Ponce – violin (2, 12)
- Emily Saliers – lead vocals (8)

=== Production ===
- Vonda Shepard – producer
- Mitchell Froom – producer
- S. Husky Hoskulds – engineer
- John Paterno – engineer
- Paul Dieter – additional engineer
- Nathaniel Kunkel – additional engineer
- Greg Burns – assistant engineer
- Juan Garcia – assistant engineer
- John Nelson – assistant engineer
- Josh Turner – assistant engineer
- Mark Willsher – assistant engineer
- Bob Clearmountain – mixing
- David Boucher – mix assistant
- Julie Larson – album coordinator
- Ria Lewerke – art direction, design
- Norman Moore – art direction, design
- Gerry Wenner – photography
- Stephanie Wolf – stylist
- Brett Freedman – hair, makeup

Studios

- Recorded at Ocean Way Recording, Conway Studios and The Sound Factory (Hollywood, California); The Magic Shop (New York City, New York).
- Mixed at Mix This! (Los Angeles, California).

== Charts ==
Chart performance for By 7:30
Chart (1999)	Peak position
Australian Albums (ARIA)	96
European Albums (Music & Media)	93
Finnish Albums (Suomen virallinen lista)	25
Norwegian Albums (VG-lista)	11
Scottish Albums (OCC)	40
UK Albums (OCC)	39
US Billboard 200	79
