= Sometimes When We Touch =

1977 single by Dan Hill

Single by Dan Hill

from the album Longer Fuse
- B-side: "Still Not Used To"
- Written: 1973
- Released: October 1977 (Canada); November 1977 (US); January 1978 (Europe); January 1978 (Australia)
- Recorded: 1977
- Studio: Manta Sound, Toronto, ON, Canada
- Genre: Soft rock, middle-of-the-road
- Length: 3:33 (Single Version); 4:12 (Album Version)
- Label: GRT (Canada); 20th Century Fox (USA/UK)
- Songwriters: Dan Hill (lyrics); Barry Mann (music)
- Producers: Matthew McCauley, Fred Mollin

Dan Hill singles chronology
"Phonecall" (1977)	"Sometimes When We Touch" (1977)	"All I See Is Your Face" (1978)

"Sometimes When We Touch" is a 1977 ballad by Canadian pop rock artist Dan Hill, from his album Longer Fuse. It was written by Hill and Barry Mann; Hill wrote the lyrics, while Mann wrote the music.

The song was Hill's first hit, peaking at #3 on the United States Billboard Hot 100 and #10 on the Adult Contemporary chart. It has since been covered by a variety of artists.

== Composition ==
"Sometimes When We Touch" began as a song Hill wrote in 1973, at age 19, in an attempt to convince the woman he was dating to be his exclusive girlfriend; at the time, she was dating two other men. The lyrics were based on the relationship between Hill and the woman, and Hill's ambivalence at not being able to express his true feelings for her. After completing it, Hill sang the song for the woman, but his attempt was unsuccessful, as she had just recently decided to move to the United States with one of the other men she had been dating, an American football player who had just been dropped from the Toronto Argonauts, the CFL team.

By 1976, Hill had released two albums, but had not yet broken into the American market. Hill was in Los Angeles, meeting with Sam Trust, the president of his publishing company, ATV Music, when Trust told Hill that he felt that Hill's problem was that his melodies were not catchy enough, and suggested that he collaborate with American songwriter Barry Mann. Hill met with Mann, and gave Mann the lyrics to his song, which he had never released. Hill told Mann that it was simply a poem he had written, not wanting Mann to feel insulted that he was receiving a rejected song. Within a day, Mann had written a new melody for the song, which required Hill to write several new lines, as Mann had restructured the lyrics somewhat.

== Production ==
"Sometimes When We Touch" was first recorded in 1977. Musicians included Bobby Ogdin (piano), Larrie Londin (drums), Bob Mann (guitar), Don Potter (guitar), and Tom Szczesniak (bass). The record was produced by Fred Mollin and Matthew McCauley. It was recorded at Manta Sound on Adelaide Street in Toronto.

== Personnel ==
- Dan Hill – vocals
- Bob Mann – electric guitar
- Don Potter – acoustic guitar
- Tom Szczesniak – bass guitar
- Bobby Ogdin – piano
- Larrie Londin – drums
- Fred Mollin – percussion
- Strings arranged and conducted by Matthew McCauley

== Charts ==
=== Weekly charts ===
Chart (1977–1978)	Peak position
Australia Kent Music Report	3
Canada Top Singles (RPM)	1
Canada Adult Contemporary (RPM)	1
New Zealand	4
South Africa (Springbok)	1
UK Singles (Official Charts)	13
US Billboard Hot 100	3
US Adult Contemporary (Billboard)	10
US Cash Box Top 100	4

=== Year-end charts ===
Chart (1978)	Rank
Australia (Kent Music Report)	22
Canada RPM Top Singles	4
New Zealand	31
US Billboard Hot 100	33
US Cash Box	19

== Certifications ==
Region	Certification	Certified units/sales
Canada (Music Canada)	Platinum	80,000^{‡}
United States (RIAA)	Gold	1,000,000^{^}
^{^} Shipments figures based on certification alone.^{‡} Sales+streaming figures based on certification alone.

== Mark Gray and Tammy Wynette version ==
"Sometimes When We Touch"

Single by Mark Gray and Tammy Wynette

from the album This 'Ol Piano or Sometimes When We Touch
- B-side: "You're Gonna Be the Last Love"
- Released: January 1985
- Genre: Country
- Length: 3:37
- Label: Columbia
- Producer: Steve Buckingham

Tammy Wynette singles chronology
"Lonely Heart" (1984)	"Sometimes When We Touch" (1985)	"You Can Lead a Heart to Love (But You Can't Make It Fall)" (1985)

Mark Gray singles chronology
"Diamond in the Dust" (1984)	"Sometimes When We Touch" (1985)	"Smooth Sailing (Rock in the Road)" (1985)

"Sometimes When We Touch" was notably covered in 1985 as a duet by American country music artists Mark Gray and Tammy Wynette.

The song was recorded in November 1984 and was produced by Steve Buckingham. It was released as a single in January 1985 via Columbia Records. The B-side of the record was a solo recording by Gray entitled "You're Gonna Be the Last Love". The single reached number 6 on the Billboard Hot Country Singles chart and number 25 on the Canadian Country chart. The song became Wynette's first top ten hit since 1982's "Another Chance" and Gray's fourth top ten hit as a solo artist.

The song was issued on both Gray and Wynette's solo studio albums. "Sometimes When We Touch" first appeared on Gray's album This 'Ol Piano in 1984. It was the only duet recording featured on the album and was his second studio album release. It was then issued on Tammy Wynette's 1985 studio album, also called Sometimes When We Touch. The track was also the only duet recording on Wynette's studio release.

=== Track listings ===
7" vinyl single

- "Sometimes When We Touch" (Mark Gray and Tammy Wynette) – 3:37
- "You're Gonna Be the Last Love" (Mark Gray) – 2:37

=== Charts ===
Chart (1985)	Peak position
US Hot Country Singles (Billboard)	6
CAN Country Singles (RPM)	24

== Other versions ==
- English singer Newton released his version in 1996 which reached No. 32 in the UK and No. 5 in Australia.
- Filipino boxer Manny Pacquiao sang the song on the November 3, 2009 episode of Jimmy Kimmel Live!. In April 2011, his recording of the song reached number 19 on the Billboard Adult Contemporary chart.
- Greek singer Demis Roussos recorded a cover version in 1979.
- Tina Turner recorded a cover version on her first post-Ike solo album, Rough, in 1979. She performed the song on The Midnight Special on January 5th of that year.
- Bonnie Tyler recorded a cover version on her 1981 album, Goodbye to the Island.

== Cultural influence ==
The song has been used in numerous films, television programs and commercials since its initial release. Among the more notable usages are the 1999 film Superstar, a 2003 GEICO commercial, the 2008 film Tropic Thunder (it is agent Rick Peck's ringtone), and the 2014 The Simpsons episode "The Yellow Badge of Cowardge".

In 1996, This Hour Has 22 Minutes ran a comedic sketch in which Canada was taken over by terrorists who in turn were promptly defeated when the Canadian Armed Forces deployed the song as their secret weapon. At the time, Hill was making television appearances to promote his new album I'm Doing Fine, and Pamela Wallin confronted Hill (who had not yet seen it) with the sketch on live national television.
