= Searchin' My Soul =

1992 song by Vonda Shepard and opening theme from Ally McBeal

Single by Vonda Shepard

from the album The Radical Light and Songs from Ally McBeal
- B-side: "I Started a Joke"; "I Only Want to Be with You"; "100 Tears Away"
- Released: April 7, 1998
- Studio: Conway, Ocean Way, A&M (Hollywood, California); Groove Masters (Santa Monica, California)
- Genre: Pop rock
- Length: 4:26 (album version); 3:59 (single version)
- Label: Sony Music Soundtrax; 550 Music
- Songwriter: Vonda Shepard
- Producer: Vonda Shepard

Vonda Shepard singles chronology
"Wake Up the House" (1992)	"Searchin' My Soul" (1998)	"Hooked on a Feeling" (1998)

Music video
- "Searchin' My Soul" on YouTube

"Searchin' My Soul" is a song written, produced, and performed by American singer and actress Vonda Shepard. It originally appeared on her second studio album, The Radical Light (1992), as the first track. In 1997, it served as the opening theme to the American legal comedy drama television program Ally McBeal and was included on the show's first soundtrack album, Songs from Ally McBeal, which was released in 1998. In April of that same year, "Searchin' My Soul" was released as a single from the soundtrack.

"Searchin' My Soul" exposed Shepard's music to a worldwide audience and became a chart hit. It reached number 16 on the US Billboard Hot 100 Airplay chart and peaked at number 14 on both the Billboard Adult Top 40 and Mainstream Top 40 rankings. In the United Kingdom, it debuted and peaked at number 10 on the UK Singles Chart, giving Shepard her only top-10 hit there. In Canada and Finland, the song entered the top 10, reaching numbers six and eight, respectively.

== Critical reception ==
Billboard magazine reviewed the song in April 1998, calling the track an equal sum of its parts and highlighting its "infectious, sing-along" chorus, noting it is not instantly forgettable.

== Track listings ==
UK CD1

1. "Searchin' My Soul" (single version) – 3:59
2. "I Started a Joke" – 3:27
3. "I Only Want to Be with You" – 2:12

UK CD2

1. "Searchin' My Soul" (single edit) – 3:14
2. "100 Tears Away" – 4:50
3. "I Only Want to Be with You" – 2:12

UK cassette single

1. "Searchin' My Soul" (single version) – 3:59
2. "Hooked on a Feeling" – 2:58

European CD single

1. "Searchin' My Soul"
2. "I Started a Joke"

European maxi-CD single

1. "Searchin' My Soul"
2. "I Started a Joke"
3. "100 Tears Away"

Australian CD single

1. "Searchin' My Soul"
2. "100 Tears Away"
3. "I Started a Joke"

== Credits and personnel ==
Credits are lifted from the Songs from Ally McBeal album booklet.

Studios

- Recorded at Conway Studios, Ocean Way Recording, A&M Studios (Hollywood, California), and Groove Masters (Santa Monica, California)
- Mastered at A&M Mastering Studios (Hollywood, California)

Personnel

- Vonda Shepard – writing, vocals, background vocals, piano, production
- Jeff Young – background vocals, Hammond B3
- Val McCallum – guitars, mandolin
- Jim Hanson – bass
- Andy Kamman – drums
- Paul Dieter – recording
- Eddie DeLena – recording
- Tom Lord-Alge – mixing
- Dave Collins – mastering

== Charts ==
=== Weekly charts ===
Chart (1998–1999)	Peak position
Australia (ARIA)	82
Canada Top Singles (RPM)	6
Canada Adult Contemporary (RPM)	22
Europe (Eurochart Hot 100)	37
Finland (Suomen virallinen lista)	8
Iceland (Íslenski Listinn Topp 40)	22
Netherlands (Dutch Top 40 Tipparade)	21
Netherlands (Single Top 100)	94
Norway (VG-lista)	16
Scottish Singles Sales (Official Charts)	7
Sweden (Sverigetopplistan)	20
UK Singles (Official Charts)	10
US Hot 100 Airplay (Billboard)	16
US Adult Contemporary (Billboard)	22
US Adult Top 40 (Billboard)	14
US Mainstream Top 40 (Billboard)	14

=== Year-end charts ===
Chart (1998)	Position
Canada Top Singles (RPM)	49
Canada Adult Contemporary (RPM)	86
UK Singles (OCC)	193
US Adult Top 40 (Billboard)	34
US Mainstream Top 40 (Billboard)	62

== Release history ==
Region	Date	Format(s)	Label(s)	Ref.
United States	April 7, 1998	Airplay	Sony Music Soundtrax; 550 Music	
United Kingdom	November 23, 1998	CD; cassette	Sony Music Soundtrax; 550 Music	
