= Fast Company (1979 film) =

- Theatrical release poster
- Directed by: David Cronenberg
- Screenplay by: David Cronenberg; Phil Savath; Courtney Smith
- Story by: Alan Treen
- Produced by: Michael Lebowitz; Peter O'Brian; Phil Savath; Courtney Smith
- Starring: William Smith; Claudia Jennings; John Saxon; Nicholas Campbell; Cedric Smith; Judy Foster; Don Francks
- Cinematography: Mark Irwin
- Edited by: Ronald Sanders
- Music by: Fred Mollin
- Distributed by: Admit One Presentations; Danton Films
- Release date: 18 May 1979
- Running time: 91 minutes
- Country: Canada
- Language: English
- Budget: $1,200,000

Fast Company is a 1979 Canadian action film directed by David Cronenberg and starring William Smith, John Saxon, Claudia Jennings and Nicholas Campbell. It was written by Phil Savath, Courtney Smith, Alan Treen and Cronenberg. It was primarily filmed at Edmonton International Speedway, in addition to other locations in Edmonton, Alberta, and Western Canada.

== Plot ==
At a racetrack, aging drag racing star Lonnie "Lucky Man" Johnson makes engine refinements to his car, which is sponsored by the international oil company Fast Company (FastCo). On its first test run it blows up, but Lonnie escapes unhurt. FastCo team boss Phil Adamson is not impressed, telling the head mechanic, Elder, that the team can't afford to win if it breaks the budget. In the "Funny Car class", Lonnie's protégé Billy "The Kid" Brooker gives top dog Gary "The Blacksmith" Black a close run.

At the Big Sky meet, Adamson takes a backhander from the organizer. He says that the fans come to see Lonnie, so while the dragster is being repaired he will replace Billy in the Funny Car. Lonnie dislikes the idea. Billy dislikes it even more, blaming Lonnie's ego. Lonnie's first ever Funny Car run is against Black, who is angry at the driver switch, especially when he loses the race.

En route to a next race in Spokane, Lonnie calls the dragster mechanic with a few ideas, but is told that Adamson cancelled the repair work. At the meet, Lonnie is less than complimentary on his FastCo TV spot. Adamson is incensed and calls the company to say he's bringing in Gary Black. Candy the FastCo ad girl refuses to have sex with the TV interviewer as damage control, so Adamson fires her. He offers Black the job as FastCo driver.

Candy and Billy have sex inside Lonnie's trailer. Lonnie’s girlfriend Sammy shows up and interrupts them, assuming at first it’s Lonnie in bed. Reunited, Lonnie and Sammy kick out Billy and Candy, and they make love. Lonnie talks about quitting racing. Adamson walks in without knocking, causing Lonnie to punch him to the floor. He says they're finished, but Lonnie assures him the car will race. Outside the trailer, Adamson gives Black and his mechanic Meatball a job.

While on another test run, the Funny Car's engine blows, but Lonnie controls the situation using the cockpit safety gear. Billy angrily accuses Black of sabotage, but Lonnie intervenes on Black's behalf. In the pit, Adamson announces that Black is the new Fast Co driver and the whole team is fired. Lonnie goes for him but is slugged with a tire iron by Meatball.

Billy is despondent, but Lonnie insists they'll still race at Edmonton next weekend and plans to steal the car. Billy and P.J. visit the local motor show and are amazed that Adamson has the car on display. That night, Billy and Candy create a diversion while Lonnie steals the car back. Working overtime, Lonnie, Billy, P.J. get it in shape for the race.

At the Edmonton racetrack, Lonnie's surprise independent entry is announced. Adamson is worried that Black will be beaten, but Meatball says he will win as long as he is in the left lane. Lonnie gives an ecstatic Billy the chance to drive in the race.

At the toss up for the lane choice, Billy wins and chooses left. Adamson ensures a last minute change, much to Billy's annoyance. Meatball pours oil on Billy’s lane. As the race gets underway Billy gets a fast start, but Black tries to run him off the road. Black takes the lead, then cuts into Billy's lane and hits the oil, causing his car to explode in a giant fireball. Billy attacks Meatball at the side of the track and in the struggle, Meatball's overalls catch fire. Billy uses his cockpit extinguisher to save his life.

Adamson panics and flees to his plane. As it taxis down the runway, Lonnie jumps in the Funny Car. He catches up just as the plane takes off, clipping the end off a wing. Adamson fights for control but the plane dives into a parked FastCo oil truck, exploding on impact.

The next morning, the team members discuss the future. Lonnie promises he'll have new funding in place soon, but first he and Sammy are going to share some quality time.

== Cast ==
- William Smith as Lonnie "Lucky Man" Johnson
- Claudia Jennings as Sammy
- John Saxon as Phil Adamson
- Nicholas Campbell as Billy "The Kid" Booker
- Don Francks as Elder
- Cedric Smith as Gary "The Blacksmith" Black
- Judy Foster as Candy
- George Buza as "Meatball"
- David Petersen as Slezak
- Michael Bell as Chuck Randall

== Production ==
David Cronenberg stated that Fast Company "was my least personal movie, even though it had to do with cars and dragsters which I loved" due to him having not written the original script. He stated that he did the film in order to support his family and that "I really did it for the money". Cronenberg met Carol Spier, Mark Irwin, Ronald Sanders, and Bryan Day while working on the film and continued working with them for much of his filmography.

Phil Savath and Courtney Smith wrote a screenplay based on a story by Alan Treen and John Hunter aided, but remained uncredited. It was the first film Cronenberg made that he did not originally write, but he did rewrite parts of the script. Peter Vronsky's Bad Company was initially written under the title Fast Company, but was altered to avoid confusion with Cronenberg's film.

The film was shot from 21 July to 29 August 1978, in Edmonton and in Calgary for two days. The film had a budget of $850,000, but cost $1,200,000 (equivalent to $5,383,607 in 2025) with $200,000 coming from the Canadian Film Development Corporation. This was the first film Cronenberg made following the creation of Canada's film tax shelter policy. Michael Lebowitz wanted Bruce Springsteen to compose the soundtrack, but Fred Mollin was selected instead.

Although Fast Company - an all-action, non-horror, non-psychological B-movie - remains an anomaly in Cronenberg's filmography, it has never lost its place in the affections of its director, who is an enthusiast of cars and their machinery ("which I get very metaphysical and boring about") and sometime racer.

This was the final film for Claudia Jennings before she was killed in a car accident later that year, seven months after the film's release.

== Release ==
Fast Company was shown at the Cannes Film Festival on 16 May 1979. It was distributed by Danton Films and released in Edmonton on 18 May 1979. However, the distributor stated that "we don't care if it ever opens in New York or Chicago" and it received a limited release. The company that planned on distributing the film in the United States went bankrupt before it was released.

== Critical reception ==
Fast Company received generally positive reviews. It holds an 88% approval rating on Rotten Tomatoes, with an average rating of 6.6/10.

Critic Hal Erickson wrote in AllMovie that the film "does not shirk in its depiction of the principal character's womanizing, which in itself is surprisingly endearing," that it "offers an indictment against corporate sponsors who tend to squeeze drivers like Johnson dry of all their salability," and that "we're offered plenty of breathtaking racing scenes, some of them real, others skillfully reenacted." A review of the film on DVD Talk noted that "there's not much about Fast Company that stands out as distinctively Cronenberg," that the director "wasn't trying to hammer out any sort of profound artistic statement," and "Is it even anything particularly memorable? Nah [but] it's pretty damned good." A review of the film in TV Guide described it as "thin on plot" and a "formula B movie about race car drivers [that is] competent, but unmemorable as anything other than a footnote in Cronenberg's development."

== Works cited ==
- Cronenberg, David (2006). David Cronenberg: Interviews with Serge Grünberg. Plexus Publishing. ISBN 0859653765.
- Mathijs, Ernest (2008). The Cinema of David Cronenberg: From Baron of Blood to Cultural Hero. Wallflower Press. ISBN 9781905674657.
- Rodley, Chris, ed. (1997). Cronenberg on Cronenberg. Faber and Faber. ISBN 0571191371.
- Turner, D. John, ed. (1987). Canadian Feature Film Index: 1913-1985. Canadian Film Institute. ISBN 0660533642.
