= Songs from Ally McBeal =

Soundtrack album by Vonda Shepard
- Released: May 5, 1998
- Studios: Conway, Ocean Way and A&M (Hollywood, California); Groove Masters (Santa Monica, California)
- Length: 42:57
- Labels: 550 Music; Sony Music Soundtrax
- Producers: Vonda Shepard; Michael Landau

Vonda Shepard chronology
It's Good, Eve (1996)	Songs from Ally McBeal (1998)	By 7:30 (1999)

Professional ratings
Review scores
Source	Rating
AllMusic	4.5/5 stars

Songs from Ally McBeal is a soundtrack album by American singer Vonda Shepard, featuring music from the American television series Ally McBeal. It was released on May 5, 1998, by 550 Music and Sony Music Soundtrax. The album consists mostly of cover versions of songs from the 1960s, aside from four original songs, including the series' theme song, "Searchin' My Soul", which originally appeared on Shepard's 1992 album The Radical Light.

The album topped the charts in Australia, New Zealand, Norway, Spain, and Sweden, while reaching number three in the United Kingdom and number seven in both the United States and Canada.

== Track listing ==
All tracks are produced by Vonda Shepard, except tracks 6 and 14, produced by Shepard and Michael Landau.

Songs from Ally McBeal track listing
No.	Title	Writer(s)	Length
1.	"Searchin' My Soul"	Shepard	3:53
2.	"Ask the Lonely" (originally by the Four Tops)	William Stevenson; Ivy Jo Hunter	2:43
3.	"Walk Away Renée" (originally by the Left Banke)	Bob Calilli; Michael Lookofsky; Tony Sansone	3:08
4.	"Hooked on a Feeling" (originally by B.J. Thomas)	Mark James	2:58
5.	"You Belong to Me" (originally by Joni James)	Pee Wee King; Redd Stewart; Chilton Price	3:28
6.	"The Wildest Times of the World"	Shepard; Landau	5:15
7.	"Someone You Use" (originally by Candi Staton)	Clarence George Carter; Hope T. Inglese; Kitty Mann; Tommy Stough	2:34
8.	"The End of the World" (originally by Skeeter Davis)	Arthur Kent; Sylvia Dee	2:34
9.	"Tell Him" (originally by Gil Hamilton)	Bert Russell Berns	2:48
10.	"Neighborhood" (originally by Dino & Sembello)	Jerry Leiber; Mike Stoller; John Sembello; Ralph Dino	2:21
11.	"Will You Marry Me?"	Shepard (music and lyrics); Landau (music)	2:39
12.	"It's in His Kiss (The Shoop Shoop Song)" (originally by Merry Clayton)	Rudy Clark	2:33
13.	"I Only Want to Be with You" (originally by Dusty Springfield)	Mike Hawker; Ivor Raymonde	2:12
14.	"Maryland"	Shepard	3:51
Total length:			42:57

== Personnel ==
Musicians

- Vonda Shepard – lead vocals, piano (1–3, 5, 6, 9, 14), keyboards (9), background vocals (1, 2, 6, 9, 12)
- Robert L. Becker – viola (8)
- Jebin Bruni – Chamberlain (11)
- Paul Bushnell – bass (11)
- Valerie Carter – background vocals (9)
- Lenny Castro – percussion (14)
- Vinnie Colaiuta – drums (6, 14)
- Larry Corbett – cello (8)
- Lynn Davis – background vocals (6)
- Renee Goldsberry – background vocals (7)
- Jim Hanson – bass (1, 3–5, 7–10, 12)
- Lili Haydn – violin (6)
- Andy Kamman – drums (1, 4, 5, 8–12), percussion (2, 12)
- Suzie Katayama – string arrangement (8)
- John Keane – additional drums (14)
- Peter Kent – violin (8)
- Vatrena King – background vocals (7)
- Rob Ladd – drums (7)
- Michael Landau – guitar (6, 7, 11, 12, 14), guitar solo (3), additional guitars (3)
- Neil Larsen – piano (8)
- Greg Leisz – pedal steel (5, 14)
- Brian MacLeod – drum loop (11)
- Val McCallum – guitar (1–5, 8–10, 13), mandolin (1), additional guitars (12), background vocals (2, 4)
- Jean McClain – background vocals (6)
- John Pierce – bass (6, 14)
- David Ravin – drums (3)
- Michele Richards – violin (8)
- Sy Smith – background vocals (7)
- Martin Tillman – cello (5, 6, 10)
- Jeff Young – Hammond B3 (1, 2, 4, 7, 12), piano (7, 10, 12, 13), background vocals (1, 4, 12)

Technical personnel

- Dave Collins – mastering
- Eddie DeLena – engineer, mixing (2–5, 7–13)
- Paul Dieter – engineer
- Alan Hirschberg – mixing (6)
- Tom Lord-Alge – mixing (1)
- Michael C. Ross – mixing (14)

== Charts ==
=== Weekly charts ===
Weekly chart performance for Songs from Ally McBeal
Chart (1998–2000)	Peak position
Australian Albums (ARIA)	1
Austrian Albums (Ö3 Austria)	20
Belgian Albums (Ultratop Flanders)	3
Belgian Albums (Ultratop Wallonia)	15
Canada Top Albums/CDs (RPM)	8
Canadian Albums (Billboard)	7
Danish Albums (Hitlisten)	3
Dutch Albums (Album Top 100)	37
European Albums (Music & Media)	7
Finnish Albums (Suomen virallinen lista)	2
French Albums (SNEP)	25
German Albums (Offizielle Top 100)	27
Hungarian Albums (MAHASZ)	10
Irish Albums (IRMA)	9
New Zealand Albums (RMNZ)	1
Norwegian Albums (VG-lista)	1
Scottish Albums (Official Charts)	2
Spanish Albums (AFYVE)	1
Swedish Albums (Sverigetopplistan)	1
Swiss Albums (Schweizer Hitparade)	18
UK Albums (Official Charts)	3
US Billboard 200	7

=== Year-end charts ===
1998 year-end chart performance for Songs from Ally McBeal
Chart	Position
Australian Albums (ARIA)	19
Canada Top Albums/CDs (RPM)	54
New Zealand Albums (RMNZ)	6
Swedish Albums (Sverigetopplistan)	6
UK Albums (OCC)	37
US Billboard 200	72

1999 year-end chart performance for Songs from Ally McBeal
Chart	Position
Australian Albums (ARIA)	12
Belgian Albums (Ultratop Wallonia)	67
Danish Albums (Hitlisten)	13
European Albums (Music & Media)	27
French Albums (SNEP)	71
German Albums (Offizielle Top 100)	85
UK Albums (OCC)	96

2000 year-end chart performance for Songs from Ally McBeal
Chart	Position
Belgian Albums (Ultratop Flanders)	38

== Certifications ==
Certifications for Songs from Ally McBeal
Region	Certification	Certified units/sales
Australia (ARIA)	4× Platinum	280,000^{^}
Belgium (BRMA)	Gold	25,000^{*}
Canada (Music Canada)	2× Platinum	200,000^{^}
Finland (Musiikkituottajat)	Platinum	50,282
France (SNEP)	Gold	100,000^{*}
Japan (RIAJ)	Gold	100,000^{^}
Netherlands (NVPI)	Gold	50,000^{^}
New Zealand (RMNZ)	Platinum	15,000^{^}
Norway (IFPI Norway)	2× Platinum	100,000^{*}
Poland (ZPAV)	Platinum	100,000^{*}
Spain (Promusicae)	3× Platinum	300,000^{^}
Sweden (GLF)	2× Platinum	160,000^{^}
United Kingdom (BPI)	Platinum	300,000^{^}
United States (RIAA)	Platinum	1,000,000^{^}
Summaries
Europe (IFPI)	2× Platinum	2,000,000^{*}
^{*} Sales figures based on certification alone.^{^} Shipments figures based on certification alone.
