= Homemade TV =

Canadian children's television series

- Genre: Children's television
- Written by: Jed McKay
- Country of origin: Canada
- Original language: English
- No. of seasons: 3

Production
- Producer: Don Elder
- Running time: 30 minutes

Original release
- Network: CBC Television
- Release: 27 February 1976 – 28 December 1977

Homemade TV is a Canadian children's television series that aired on CBC Television from 1976 to 1977.

== Premise ==
This series featured comedy segments from the Homemade Theatre company (Barry Flatman, Fred Mollin, Larry Mollin, Phil Savath). Jed McKay, another company member, was not in the regular cast but served as series writer.

"The Big Story" was a feature sketch in each episode. Some segments were parodies of other films and plays such as "Pigmalion" (for Pygmalion) and "Ricky" (instead of Rocky). Other sketches included the period piece "Rock 'n Romans", whose characters were Emperor Rollus and Roculuse, his slave. Quebec separatism was the focus of the bilingual sketch "Ouest Side Story". In its final run from October 1977, episodes featured a magazine structure, with the participation of children who submitted story ideas or who joined the cast on set. The children who joined the cast on set were selected from the Young People's Theatre acting school at which the members of the Homemade Theatre company taught.

Each episode began with the following voiceover: "It's 4:30. Do you know where your parents are?"

== Scheduling ==
The initial run of this half-hour series was broadcast weekdays at 4:30 p.m. (Eastern time) from 27 February to 26 March 1976. The second season aired weekly on Tuesdays at 5:00 p.m. from 2 November 1976 to 8 March 1977. Its third and final run was broadcast on Wednesdays at 4:00 p.m. from 5 October to 28 December 1977. Rebroadcasts were scheduled from June to August 1977 and from April to June 1978.

== Response ==
The series received an ACTRA Award nomination for Best Children's Television Program at the 7th ACTRA Awards in 1978.
