= Dan Hill (1987 album) =

Studio album by Dan Hill
- Released: August 11, 1987
- Recorded: 1987
- Studio: Manta Sound and Sounds Interchange (Toronto, Ontario, Canada); Ground Control Studios and El Dorado Recording Studios (Burbank, California, USA)
- Genre: Pop
- Length: 38:53
- Label: Columbia
- Producer: Hank Medress; John Capek

Dan Hill chronology
Love in the Shadows (1983)	Dan Hill (1987)	Real Love (1989)

Singles from Dan Hill
- 1. "Can't We Try" Released: 1987; 2. "Never Thought (That I Could Love)" Released: 1987; 3. "Carmelia" Released: 1988

Dan Hill is an album by Canadian musician Dan Hill. It was released in 1987 on Columbia Records. It is Hill's eighth album in all, and his second eponymous release, following his 1975 debut album.

The lead single from the album was a duet with Vonda Shepard, "Can't We Try", which peaked at No. 6 on the Billboard Hot 100. Along with "Can't We Try", two other tracks, "Never Thought (That I Could Love)" and "Carmelia", also reached the top ten of the Billboard Adult Contemporary chart.

== Track listing ==
1. "Conscience" (Dan Hill, John Capek) – 3:54
2. "Carmelia" (Hill, Capek) – 3:51
3. "Can't We Try" (Duet with Vonda Shepard) (Hill, Beverly Chapin-Hill) – 4:02
4. "Blood in My Veins" (Hill, Warren Pash) – 3:51
5. "Never Thought (That I Could Love)" (Hill) – 3:36
6. "Every Boys Fantasy" (Hill, Gabe Lee) – 3:26
7. "Lose Control" (Hill, Capek) – 3:48
8. "Perfect Love" (Hill, Barry Mann, Scott Cutler) – 4:49
9. "Pleasure Centre" (Hill, John Sheard) – 3:50
10. "USA/USSR" (Hill, Sheard) – 3:50

== Personnel ==
- Dan Hill – vocals, backing vocals (1–4, 6–10)
- John Capek – keyboards (1, 2, 7), synth bass (1, 2), drum programming (1, 2, 7–10)
- John Sheard – synth bass (1, 5, 8–10), backing vocals (1, 2, 8, 9), keyboards (2–6, 8, 9), string arrangements (3, 5)
- Michael Landau – guitars (1–5, 8–10)
- Tony Riparetti – guitars (4, 6, 7)
- Nathan East – bass (2, 3, 6)
- Reggie McBride – bass (7)
- Craig Krampf – percussion (1, 2, 10), drums (3–6)
- David Woodford – alto saxophone (2)
- Vonda Shepard – vocals (3)

=== Production ===
- John Capek – producer
- Hank Medress – producer (1–6, 8–10), vocal producer
- Paul Ratajczak – engineer (1–6, 8–10)
- Scott Singer – engineer (7), mixing (7)
- Michael Hutchinson – mixing (1, 2, 4, 8)
- David Thoener – mixing (3, 5, 6, 9, 10)
- Kevin Doyle – assistant engineer
- Darwin Foye – assistant engineer
- John Naslen – assistant engineer
- Rick Starks – assistant engineer
- Bob Ludwig – mastering at Masterdisk (New York City, New York, USA)
- John Sheard – music director
- Lisa Roy – production coordinator
- Stacy Drummond – art direction, design
- Nancy Levine – photography

== In popular culture ==
The songs "Can't We Try" and "Never Thought (That I Could Love)" were both used on the American daytime drama Santa Barbara.
