= Heart and Soul: New Songs from Ally McBeal =

Soundtrack album by Vonda Shepard
- Released: November 9, 1999
- Studios: Groove Masters (Santa Monica, California); Conway, Ocean Way Recording and The Sound Factory (Hollywood, California)
- Length: 49:29
- Labels: Epic; 550 Music; Sony Music Soundtrax
- Producers: Vonda Shepard; Mitchell Froom

Vonda Shepard chronology
By 7:30 (1999)	Heart and Soul: New Songs from Ally McBeal (1999)	Chinatown (2002)

Professional ratings
Review scores
Source	Rating
AllMusic	2/5 stars

Heart and Soul: New Songs from Ally McBeal is a soundtrack album by American singer Vonda Shepard, featuring music from the American television series Ally McBeal. It was released on November 9, 1999, by Epic Records, 550 Music, and Sony Music Soundtrax.

== Track listing ==
All tracks are produced by Vonda Shepard, except tracks 1, 2 and 10–12, produced by Shepard and Mitchell Froom.

Heart and Soul: New Songs from Ally McBeal track listing
No.	Title	Lyrics	Music	Length
1.	"Read Your Mind"	Shepard	Froom; Shepard	4:10
2.	"100 Tears Away"	Shepard; Paul Gordon	Shepard; Gordon	4:07
3.	"Someday We'll Be Together"	Jackey Beavers; John Bristol; Harvey Fuqua	Beavers; Bristol; Fuqua	3:28
4.	"To Sir, with Love" (duet with Al Green)	Don Black	Mark London	4:42
5.	"Sweet Inspiration"	Dan Penn; Spooner Oldham	Penn; Oldham	3:13
6.	"Crying"	Roy Orbison; Joe Melson	Orbison; Melson	3:31
7.	"Vincent (Starry Starry Night)"	Don McLean	McLean	2:36
8.	"What Becomes of the Brokenhearted"	James Dean; Paul Riser; William Weatherspoon	Dean; Riser; Weatherspoon	3:02
9.	"World Without Love"	John Lennon; Paul McCartney	Lennon; McCartney	2:55
10.	"Confetti"	Shepard	Shepard	3:25
11.	"Baby, Don't You Break My Heart Slow" (duet with Emily Saliers of the Indigo Girls)	Shepard	Shepard; James Newton Howard	4:41
12.	"This Is Crazy Now"	Shepard	Shepard	3:35
13.	"This Old Heart of Mine (Is Weak for You)"	Sylvia Moy; Brian Holland; Edward Holland Jr.; Lamont Dozier	Moy; B. Holland; E. Holland; Dozier	2:46
14.	"I Know Him by Heart"	Paul Williams; Jon Vezner	Williams; Vezner	3:18
Total length:				49:29

Australian and Asian edition bonus track
No.	Title	Writer(s)	Length
15.	"Hidden Persuasion"	Wainwright Churchill III	2:30
Total length:			51:59

== Personnel ==
=== Musicians ===
- Vonda Shepherd – vocals, backing vocals (1–5, 10, 12), acoustic piano (2, 7, 11, 12), acoustic guitar (10)
- Mitchell Froom – acoustic piano (1, 3), Hammond B3 organ (1, 3, 6, 11, 13), electric harpsichord (1), Wurlitzer electric piano (2, 5, 9), string arrangements (2, 6), clavinet (4), orchestra bells (6, 8), accordion (7), harmonium (9), Chamberlin (10), claviola (12), celesta (13)
- Jeff Young – backing vocals (3, 5, 8), Wurlitzer electric piano (4), Hammond B3 organ (4, 5, 8), acoustic piano (5, 6, 8, 13)
- Neil Larsen – acoustic piano (13)
- Val McCallum – guitars (1–4, 8, 9, 13), additional guitars (6), backing vocals (8, 9), electric guitar (10), acoustic guitar (12)
- Michael Landau – guitars (6, 11)
- Greg Leisz – pedal steel guitar (12)
- Davey Faragher – bass (1–4, 6, 8, 9, 11, 13)
- Jimmy Haslip – bass (5)
- Jim Hanson – bass (10)
- Leland Sklar – bass (11, 12)
- Pete Thomas – drums (1–4, 9–12), additional drums (6, 8), percussion (6, 8, 9, 11)
- Mauricio "Fritz" Lewak – drums (5, 13)
- Andy Kamman – drums (6, 8), additional drums (12), percussion (12)
- Suzie Katayama – cello (2, 6)
- Martin Tillman – cello (7)
- Matt Funes – viola (2, 6)
- Charlie Bisharat – violin (2, 6)
- Joel Derouin – violin (2, 6)
- Geraldo Hilera – violin (2, 6)
- Edmund Stein – violin (2, 6)
- Lynn Davis – backing vocals (3, 5)
- Al Green – vocals (4)
- Emily Saliers – vocals (11)
- Renee Goldberry – backing vocals (13)
- Vatrena King – backing vocals (13)
- Sy Smith – backing vocals (13)

=== Production ===
- David E. Kelley – executive producer
- Paul Dieter – recording
- John Paterno – recording
- Eddie DeLena, Nathaniel Kunkel and Josh Turner – additional recording
- Rob Brill, Nathan Burden, Greg Burns, Jeff Burns, Greg Collins, Tony Flores, Lior Goldenberg, Sebastian Haimerl, Mark Johnson, John Nelson, Adam Samuels, Alan Sanderson, Mike Scotella, John Sorenson and John Tyree – assistant engineers
- Bob Clearmountain – mixing at Mix This! (Pacific Palisades, California)
- David Boucher – mix assistant
- Bob Ludwig – mastering at Gateway Mastering (Portland, Maine)
- Gail Gellman, Gary Gilbert, Jeffrey Kramer, Hellen Park, Malcolm Wiseman and Pamela Wisne – album and music coordination
- Coco Shinomiya – album design
- Pamela Springsteen – photography
- Brett Freedman and Victor Vidal – hair stylists
- Brett Freedman and Collier Strong – make-up
- George Blodwell, Lynne Bugai and Ricci DeMartino – stylists

== Charts ==
=== Weekly charts ===
Weekly chart performance for Heart and Soul: New Songs from Ally McBeal
Chart (1999–2000)	Peak position
Australian Albums (ARIA)	17
Austrian Albums (Ö3 Austria)	18
Belgian Albums (Ultratop Flanders)	41
Dutch Albums (Album Top 100)	29
European Albums (Music & Media)	19
Finnish Albums (Suomen virallinen lista)	19
French Albums (SNEP)	38
German Albums (Offizielle Top 100)	19
New Zealand Albums (RMNZ)	21
Norwegian Albums (VG-lista)	14
Scottish Albums (Official Charts)	8
Spanish Albums (AFYVE)	16
Swedish Albums (Sverigetopplistan)	7
Swiss Albums (Schweizer Hitparade)	22
UK Albums (Official Charts)	9
US Billboard 200	60

2004 weekly chart performance for Heart and Soul: New Songs from Ally McBeal
Chart (2004)	Peak position
Italian Albums (FIMI)	59

=== Year-end charts ===
1999 year-end chart performance for Heart and Soul: New Songs from Ally McBeal
Chart (1999)	Position
Australian Albums (ARIA)	88
Swedish Albums (Sverigetopplistan)	71
UK Albums (OCC)	58

2000 year-end chart performance for Heart and Soul: New Songs from Ally McBeal
Chart (2000)	Position
Australian Albums (ARIA)	81
German Albums (Offizielle Top 100)	91

== Certifications ==
Certifications for Heart and Soul: New Songs from Ally McBeal
Region	Certification	Certified units/sales
Australia (ARIA)	Platinum	70,000^{^}
Austria (IFPI Austria)	Gold	25,000^{*}
Canada (Music Canada)	Gold	50,000^{^}
Germany (BVMI)	Gold	150,000^{^}
Netherlands (NVPI)	Gold	50,000^{^}
New Zealand (RMNZ)	Gold	7,500^{^}
Norway (IFPI Norway)	Gold	25,000^{*}
Spain (Promusicae)	Platinum	100,000^{^}
Sweden (GLF)	Gold	40,000^{^}
United Kingdom (BPI)	Platinum	300,000^{^}
United States (RIAA)	Gold	500,000^{^}
^{*} Sales figures based on certification alone.^{^} Shipments figures based on certification alone.
