= Range Ryder and the Calgary Kid =

- Genre: children's television
- Written by: Jed MacKay; Larry Mollin; Phil Savath
- Country of origin: Canada
- Original language: English

Production
- Running time: 30 minutes

Range Ryder and the Calgary Kid is a Canadian children's television series. It debuted on CBC Television in 1977.
