= Ronney Abramson =

Canadian singer-songwriter

- Born: Paris, France
- Genres: Rock; Pop
- Occupations: Singer; songwriter; musician
- Instruments: Vocals; guitar
- Years active: 1971–1985, 2019
- Label: True North
- Website: ronneyabramson.com

Ronney Abramson is a French-born Canadian singer, songwriter and musician.

== Early life ==
Abramson was born in Paris, but in her early childhood moved to Canada and grew up in Montreal. She enrolled at McGill University and attended The Faculty of Arts as well as the Faculty of Music where she studied classical guitar.

== Musical career ==
=== Early career ===
After leaving university, she began performing in coffee houses of Quebec and Ontario, before recording her first album in 1971 produced by Andre Perry, which was released in 1972 by Capitol Records.

For her second album Stowaway she signed a contract with True North Records. This album contained her first hit "Your Love Gets Me Around".

In 1978 she released her third album Jukebox of Paris featuring the song "Trouble" with guest star David Clayton-Thomas of Blood Sweat & Tears, and her hit "Light Up Your Love".

For the Juno Awards of 1979 Abramson was nominated in the "Most Promising Vocalist" of the year category.

She performed at Hugh's Room in Toronto as part of Tin Pan North 2019.

=== The Rugrats ===
The Rugrats were a Canadian children's musical group created by Abramson with Ron Garant and Fred Mollin. The group's 1983 debut album, Rugrat Rock, was produced by Mollin; it won the Best Children's Album category at the Juno Awards of 1984.

In 1985 the band recorded a second album, The Rugrats Rock On, which featured Mollin.

== Later life ==
Abramson currently lives in Ottawa, Ontario.

== Discography ==
- 1972 Ronney Abramson (Capitol)
  - Tracks:

1. "Noah"
2. "Smilin' Day Man"
3. "Accident"
4. "I'm Holding Out My Hand"
5. "Banana Blues"
6. "Purify My River"
7. "Ride The Waves"
8. "Old Time Friend"
9. "And The Child Will Smile"
10. "Smithsky Bagel Factory Blues"

- 1977 Stowaway (True North)
  - Tracks:

1. "Your Love Gets Me Around"
2. "Moon's Memory/Sometime"
3. "Long Lonely Winter"
4. "S-T-O-Please"
5. "Baby Brown Eyes"
6. "Two Faces Of Woman"
7. "As Time Sneaks By"
8. "Never Seem To Get Along Without You"
9. "Song For Canaan"
10. "The Best Friend I've Ever Known"

- 1978 Jukebox of Paris (True North)
  - Tracks:

1. "Trouble" (with David Clayton-Thomas)
2. "Sweet Love in Your Eyes"
3. "Where Are We Going"
4. "Walking Me Home"
5. "He Needs You Anyway"
6. "Beggar on Fire"
7. "Jukebox of Paris"
8. "Rocking Your Way Through School"
9. "A Million Miles Away"
10. "Wake Me This Time"
11. "Light Up Your Love"

- 1983: Rugrat Rock (A&M)
- 1985: The Rugrats Rock On (A&M)

=== Singles ===
- 1977 "Question For An Answer" (True North)
- 1977 "Your Love Gets Me Around" (True North)
- 1977 "Never Seem To Get Along Without You" (True North)
- 1979 "Light Up Your Love" (True North)
- 1979 "Trouble" (True North)
- 1980 "I'm a Big Girl" (True North)
- 1980 "Je Suis Libre" (True North)

== See also ==
- Music of Canada
