= Dan Hill =

Canadian singer (born 1954)

- Born: Daniel Grafton Hill IV; 3 June 1954 (age 72); Toronto, Ontario, Canada
- Occupation: Singer-songwriter
- Children: 1
- Father: Daniel G. Hill
- Musical career
- Genres: Pop; soft rock; R&B; soul; middle-of-the-road
- Instruments: Vocals; piano; guitar
- Years active: 1975–present
- Website: danhill.com

Daniel Grafton Hill IV (born 3 June 1954) is a Canadian pop singer and songwriter. He had two major international hits with his songs "Sometimes When We Touch" and "Can't We Try", a duet with Vonda Shepard, as well as a number of other charting singles in Canada and the United States. He also established himself as a songwriter who produced hit songs for artists such as George Benson and Celine Dion.

== Early life ==
Hill was born in Toronto, the son of social scientist and public servant Daniel G. Hill and social activist Donna Mae Hill (née Bender, 1928–2018), and older brother of the author Lawrence Hill and the late novelist Karen Hill. His musical talent was apparent from a young age, and he received his first guitar shortly after his tenth birthday. While in high school, he was singing and performing at concerts and coffee houses. At one point Hill was working for the Ontario provincial government sorting mail and delivering supplies, while performing at the Riverboat at night. Before finishing high school, he recorded a demo tape with the assistance of his boyhood friend Matt McCauley, later a well-known composer and arranger. In 1972, he signed a contract with RCA, who released a single the following year but did little to advance his career.

== Career ==
Continuing to record with McCauley, he succeeded in breaking the RCA contract and signing with GRT Records, an independent Canadian label. In 1975, they released his first Canadian hit single,"You Make Me Want to Be," which was followed by his first album, Dan Hill.

In 1977, Hill recorded the ballad "Sometimes When We Touch". He also wrote the lyrics and was assisted in the music by Barry Mann for the album from the same year, Longer Fuse, and it was released as a single. It was Hill's biggest hit, peaking at No. 3 on the US Billboard Hot 100 and No. 1 on the Canadian RPM Singles chart, and leading to Hill's appearances on The Merv Griffin Show and The Mike Douglas Show. Tina Turner covered the song in 1978 on her album Rough. At one point, Hill regarded the song as an "albatross" that was limiting his career as a singer; no matter what he recorded, if the song happened to be a ballad, people thought it sounded like "Sometimes When We Touch". Years later, he came to appreciate that "Sometimes When We Touch" had opened doors to "every possible facet of the music business" and enabled him to develop into a successful songwriter and producer.

Another one of his hit songs was "It's a Long Road", which he recorded for the 1982 action movie First Blood. In 1985, he was one of the many Canadian performers to appear on the benefit single "Tears Are Not Enough" by Northern Lights. Although he had many hits in his native Canada, further singles did not fare as well in the United States, where, after "Let the Song Last Forever" in late 1978, he went almost a decade without cracking any of Billboard's singles charts.

In 1987, Hill returned to the Billboard Hot 100 with the Top 40 hit "Can't We Try", a duet with the then-unknown Vonda Shepard (her last name was incorrectly spelled "Sheppard" on the label). It peaked at No. 6 on the Hot 100. He also had a near Top 40 hit with "Never Thought (That I Could Love)". Both records reached No. 2 on the Adult Contemporary chart and set the stage for Hill to have three more top 10 U.S. AC hits through to 1991's "I Fall All Over Again", though he did not make the Hot 100 again after "Never Thought".

In 1996, Hill received a Grammy for his role as co-producer on Celine Dion's album Falling Into You. In 2021, he was to be inducted into the Canadian Songwriters Hall of Fame.

As one of the new Canadian singers and songwriters, such as Bruce Cockburn and Murray McLauchlan, who emerged from the coffeehouses and other small venues during the 1970s, Hill belongs to the generation who achieved a prominent place in Canadian popular culture. In addition to his Grammy for his work on Celine Dion's Falling into You, he received five Juno Awards and other prestigious awards. A road trip to a Hill concert was the subject of the 1994 Canadian comedy film, South of Wawa. Although he has performed less frequently in recent decades, in 2007, he toured with the CBC Radio program The Vinyl Cafe.

Hill was a lifelong friend of writer Paul Quarrington, and the two also occasionally performed together as a folk music duo, billed as Quarrington/Hill. The pair's final collaboration, a song about death called "Are You Ready", was completed just ten days before Quarrington's death in early 2010, which would be featured in a television documentary, Paul Quarrington: Life in Music.

Hill befriended Manny Pacquiao after the boxer sang a version of "Sometimes When We Touch" on Jimmy Kimmel Live! in 2009. Hill later helped Pacquiao record a version of the song at Capitol Studios in Hollywood, Los Angeles.

A summary of his career, published in 2021, added some specifics:

throughout the 1990s, he focused on penning lyrics for some of the most prominent singers of the era, including Britney Spears, Backstreet Boys and Reba McEntire ... he returned to his singer-songwriter roots with the 2020 single "What About Black Lives?" part of the yet-to-be-released studio album "On the Other Side of Here".

The Canadian Songwriters Hall of Fame (CSHF) announced the induction of Dan Hill on 10 February 2021.

== Personal life ==
Dan Hill is divorced from Beverly Chapin and is with a new partner. He has one son, David, with his ex-wife. Some sources have incorrectly stated that he was married to American country singer Faith Hill, whose surname comes from her first marriage to an unrelated Nashville record executive also named Daniel Hill.

In early 2009, Hill published I Am My Father's Son: A Memoir of Love and Forgiveness (ISBN 978-1-55468-190-7) which recounts his childhood and his relationship with his prominent father. Like his father, Hill was diagnosed as a diabetic. Hill learned from a doctor before a concert that he was diagnosed with prostate cancer.

Hill wrote an article in the 14 February 2008 edition of Maclean's entitled "Every Parent's Nightmare", about the terror he experienced from friends his son brought home. On 14 March 2008, CBC Television's The National aired an in-depth interview with Hill discussing his son's involvement with Toronto gangs.

Hill is a member of the Canadian charity Artists Against Racism.

== Discography ==
=== Studio albums ===
- 1975: Dan Hill
- 1976: Hold On
- 1977: Longer Fuse AUS No. 9
- 1978: Frozen in the Night
- 1980: If Dreams Had Wings
- 1981: Partial Surrender
- 1983: Love in the Shadows
- 1987: Dan Hill
- 1989: Real Love
- 1991: Dance of Love
- 1996: I'm Doing Fine
- 2010: Intimate
- 2011: Intimate Dan Hill: The Platinum Collection
- 2021: On The Other Side of Here

=== Compilation albums ===
- 1980: The Best of Dan Hill
- 1984: Sometimes When We Touch: The Best of Dan Hill AUS No. 74
- 1989: The Dan Hill Collection
- 1993: Let Me Show You: Greatest Hits & More...
- 1999: Love of My Life: The Best of Dan Hill

=== Singles ===
Year	Song	AUS	Canada	CAN AC	US	US AC	UK	Album
1975	"You Make Me Want to Be"	-	24	16	-	-	-	Dan Hill (1975)
1975	"Growin' Up"	-	41	30	67	–	–	Dan Hill (1975)
1976	"You Say You're Free"	-	61	13	–	–	–	Dan Hill (1975)
1976	"Hold On"	-	46	–	–	–	–	Hold On
1977	"Phonecall"	-	53	17	–	–	–	Hold On
1977	"Sometimes When We Touch"	3	1	1	3	10	13	Longer Fuse
1978	"All I See Is Your Face"	-	35	36	41	8	–	Frozen in the Night
1978	"Let the Song Last Forever"	-	14	19	91	50	–	Frozen in the Night
1978	"On the Dark Side of Atlanta"	-	44	–	–	–	–	Frozen in the Night
1979	"(Why Did You Have to Go and) Pick on Me"	-	57	35	–	–	–	Frozen in the Night
	"Hold On To The Night b/w When You Smile at Me"	-	-	-	-	-	-	
1980	"I Still Reach for You"	-	83	9	–	–	–	If Dreams Had Wings
1981	"Don't Give Up on Love"	-	–	–	–	–	–	Partial Surrender
1982	"I'm Just a Man"	-	–	20	–	–	–	Partial Surrender
1983	"Love in the Shadows"	-	45	24	–	–	–	Love in the Shadows
1983	"It's a Long Road"	57	–	–	–	–	–	Love in the Shadows
1984	"Helpless"	-	–	–	–	–	–	Love in the Shadows
1984	"You Pulled Me Through"	-	–	–	–	–	–	Love in the Shadows
1987	"Can't We Try" (w/ Vonda Shepard)	41	14	2	6	2	–	Dan Hill (1987)
1987	"Never Thought (That I Could Love)"	98	22	8	43	2	–	Dan Hill (1987)
1988	"Carmelia"	-	?	?	–	8	–	Dan Hill (1987)
1989	"Why Do We Always Hurt the Ones We Love"	-	–	–	–	–	–	Real Love
1989	"Unborn Heart"	-	25	1	–	3	–	Real Love
1989	"Wishful Thinking" (w/ Celine Dion)	-	?	?	–	–	–	Real Love
1991	"I Fall All Over Again"	-	34	7	–	7	–	Dance of Love
1992	"Hold Me Now" (with Rique Franks)	-	?	?	–	30	–	Dance of Love
1993	"Sometimes When We Touch" (w/ Rique Franks)	-	46	–	–	–	–	Let Me Show You – Greatest Hits and More
1994	"In Your Eyes" (w/ Rique Franks)	-	?	?	–	38	–	Let Me Show You – Greatest Hits and More
