= Phil Savath =

American-born Canadian film and television writer and producer

Phil Savath (December 28, 1946 - November 3, 2004) was an American-born Canadian film and television writer and producer. He was most noted as a two-time Genie Award nominee for Best Screenplay, with nominations for Original Screenplay at the 4th Genie Awards in 1983 for Big Meat Eater and Adapted Screenplay at the 10th Genie Awards in 1989 for The Outside Chance of Maximilian Glick.

His other film credits included Fast Company, Samuel Lount, and Terminal City Ricochet.

In television, he was a cocreator and star of the CBC Television children's comedy series Homemade TV and Range Ryder and the Calgary Kid in the 1970s. He later wrote several episodes of Beverly Hills, 90210, co-created the television series Max Glick with Stephen Foster and These Arms of Mine with his wife Susan Duligal, and cowrote the television films Net Worth and Little Criminals.
