= Matthew McCauley (producer) =

Canadian record producer (born 1954)

- Born: 1 April 1954 (age 72); Ottawa, Ontario, Canada
- Occupations: Composer, record producer

Matthew McCauley (born 1 April 1954) is a Canadian composer and record producer based in Los Angeles. In 1977 Matthew produced Dan Hill's song "Sometimes When We Touch". His film scores include Between Friends (1973), City on Fire (1979), Middle Age Crazy (1980), In the Custody of Strangers (1982) and Thunder Run (1986).

== Early life ==
McCauley was born in Ottawa, Ontario, the son of composer William McCauley and Patricia McFarlane, daughter of author Leslie McFarlane. He grew up in Toronto, where his father was the musical director of the O'Keefe Centre.

== Career ==
McCauley began creating film scores with his father as a teenager. In 1973 he composed the score for the film Between Friends. He also composed the music for the 1975 film Sudden Fury, which was screened at the Cannes Film Festival.

In 1977 McCauley and Fred Mollin produced Ronney Abramson's album Stowaway at True North Records. That year McCauley travelled to Egypt, where he and anthropology student Mark Lehner began to study and map the Giza Plateau, near Cairo. McCauley is the cofounder of Ancient Egypt Research Associates which is based at the Harvard Semitic Museum. Established in 1985, AERA carries out excavations and digital mapping at the plateau.

In 1979 McCauley and Mollin were nominated for a Juno Award for Producer of the Year. A year later McCauley and Mollin produced the album Alibi for the band America.

In 2000 McCauley was music director of the television series Andromeda; in 2001 he won a Leo Award for his composition for the series, "Music from a Distant Drum". In 2002 he was presented with a Cleveland Regional Emmy award for his composition "Squeakers", and that year, from the Society of Composers, Authors and Music Publishers of Canada (SOCAN), won the Domestic Non-Animated Television Series Music Award.

== Personal ==
McCauley's great grandfather and namesake, Matthew McCauley, was the first mayor of Edmonton, Alberta, in 1892, and a member of the Legislative Assembly of Alberta from 1905 to 1909.
