= Louis d'Ailleboust de Coulonge =

Canadian politician

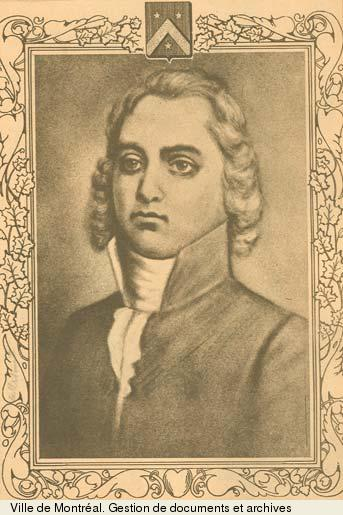
- Born: 1612; Ancy-le-Franc
- Died: 31 May 1660 (aged 47–48); Ville-Marie
- Occupations: Governor of New France; Governor of Montreal
- Parent(s): Antoine d'Ailleboust; Suzanne Hotman
- Relatives: François Hotman

Louis d'Ailleboust de Coulonge (c. 1612 – 31 May 1660) was the French governor of New France from 1648 to 1651 and acting governor from 1657 to 1658. He caused to be built the house that is today known as the Duke of Kent House, Quebec.

== Biography ==
He was born at Ancy-le-Franc into a noble family, the son of Antoine d'Ailleboust and Suzanne Hotman. His grandfather was François Hotman. He was trained as a military engineer. He went to Ville-Marie (now Montréal) in 1643 and played a leading role there; he was an acting governor of Montreal.

After being named governor in 1648, he tried in vain to prevent the Iroquois from annihilating most of the Hurons, who had allied themselves with the French settlers.

On 17 May 1657, at Saint-Nazaire, Paul Chomedey de Maisonneuve and d'Ailleboust, as well as three Sulpicians (Gabriel Souart, Antoine d'Allet, and Dominique Galinier) under the leadership of Gabriel de Queylus, the first superior of Saint-Sulpice at Montreal, boarded the ship bound for Canada. The travellers, after a stormy crossing, landed on the Île d'Orléans, 29 July. In the middle of August the four Sulpicians, whom the Jesuits had kept as their guests for a few days in their residence, settled down at Ville-Marie.

Louis d'Ailleboust died at Montreal on 31 May 1660, at the age of 48. He left no children. He was buried on 1 June 1660, in the cemetery of the hospital that stood on the site of today's Place d'Armes.

== See also ==
- Laurent Bermen

Government offices
Preceded by Charles de Montmagny	Governor of New France; 1648–1651	Succeeded by Jean de Lauson
