= Carrière =

Carrière may refer to:

- Calvin Carrière (1921–2002), U.S. fiddler
- Élie-Abel Carrière (1818–1896), French botanist
- Eric Carrière (born 1973), French footballer
- Eugène Carrière (1849–1906), French lithographer and painter
- Eva Carrière (1886–?), French spiritualist
- Jean-Claude Carrière (1931–2021), French novelist, screenwriter and actor
- Joseph Carrière (1795–1864), French theologian
- Joseph Médard Carrière (1902–1970), Canadian folklorist
- Keumhee Chough Carrière, Korean-Canadian statistician
- Larry Carriere (born 1952), Canadian ice hockey player
- Louis-Chrétien Carrière, Baron de Beaumont (1771–1813), French cavalry general
- Mathieu Carrière (born 1950), German actor
- Moritz Carrière (1817–1895), German philosopher and historian
- Serge Carrière, a medical researcher

The Anglicized version, Carriere, may refer to:

- Elizabeth Carriere, Governor of Montserrat from 2015 to 2018
- Jeromy Carriere, American architect
- Mareike Carriere (1954–2014), German actress
- Stephen Carriere (born 1989), American figure skater
