= Carrere =

Carrère is a French surname coming from Occitan Carrera. It was rendered as Carrere in Mexican Spanish. It may refer to:

== As a name ==
- Georges Carrère (1897–1986), French classical violinist
- Edward Carrere (1906–1984), Mexican art director
- Emmanuel Carrère (1957–), French author, screenwriter, and director
- Fernando Carrere (1910–1998), Mexican art director
- Hélène Carrère d'Encausse (1929–), French politician historian
- Jean-Louis Carrère (1944–), French politician
- Tia Carrere (1967–), American actress, model, and singer

== Other ==
- Carrère, a commune in France
- Carrere Group, a French television production and distribution company
- Carrere Records, a French record label
- HMS Carrère, an early 19th-century frigate

== See also ==
- Carree (name)
- Carrère and Hastings
- Carrière
