= François de Laval =

First Catholic bishop of Québec (1623–1708)

Saint François de Laval
- Bishop of Québec
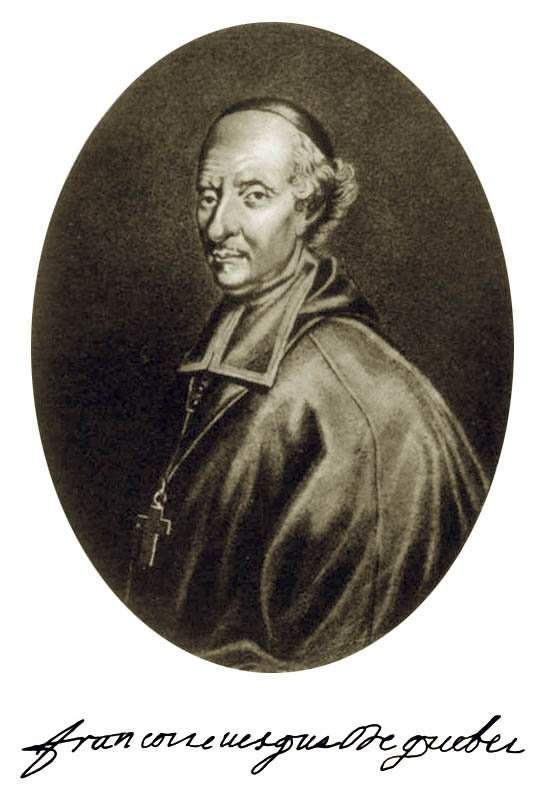
- Diocese: Quebec
- Appointed: 1 October 1674
- Term ended: 24 January
- Previous posts: Apostolic Vicar of New France (1658–1674); Titular Bishop of Petra in Palaestina (1658–1674)

Orders
- Ordination: 1 May 1647 by François de Péricard
- Consecration: 8 December 1658 by: Celio Piccolomini with; Hardouin de Péréfixe de Beaumont; André du Saussay

Personal details
- Born: François de Laval de Montmorency; 30 April 1623 Montigny-sur-Avre, Perche, Kingdom of France
- Died: 6 May 1708 (aged 85) Quebec, Viceroyalty of New France, French colonial empire
- Buried: Cathedral-Basilica of Notre-Dame de Québec
- Denomination: Catholic Church
- Parents: Hugues de Laval; Michelle de Péricard
- Signature: François de Laval's signature

- Coat of arms: François de Laval's coat of arms

Sainthood
- Feast day: 6 May
- Venerated in: Roman Catholic Church
- Title as Saint: Bishop
- Beatified: 22 June 1980; Saint Peter's Basilica, Vatican City by Pope John Paul II
- Canonized: 3 April 2014; Apostolic Palace, Vatican City by Pope Francis
- Attributes: Episcopal attire
- Shrines: Notre-Dame de Québec Cathedral, Quebec City, Quebec, Canada

Francis-Xavier de Montmorency-Laval, commonly referred to as François de Laval (French pronunciation: [fʁɑ̃swa də laval]; 30 April 1623 – 6 May 1708), was considered the founder of the Catholic faith in New France. He was a French Catholic prelate who served as Apostolic Vicar of New France from 1658 to 1674. In 1674, he was given the diocese, making him the first bishop of Quebec. He held this position until he retired due to poor health in 1688. He continued to work in New France until his death in 1708.

Among his accomplishments was the founding of the Séminaire de Québec in 1663. Laval was a member of the Montmorency family via cadet branch of the House of Laval, but renounced his rights as heir so he could pursue his ecclesiastical career.

He was beatified by Pope John Paul II on 22 June 1980 and Pope Francis declared him a saint on 3 April 2014.

== Early life ==
Laval was born on 30 April 1623 in Montigny-Sur-Avre in the ancient Province of Perche, now the Department of Eure-et-Loir. His father Hugues de Laval, a member of the House of Laval, was the Seigneur of Montigny, Montbaudry, Alaincourt and Revercourt. His mother Michelle de Péricard (daughter of Nicolas Péricard and Anne de Chantelou) was from a family of hereditary officers of the Crown in Normandy. Her brother was François de Péricard, bishop of Évreux. Despite his family's heritage, his parents were not considered to be wealthy. Montigny was considered equivalent to a good-sized market-town. François (Francis) was baptized on 30 April 1623 in St. Martin's Church in Montigny-sur-Avre. He was named after Francis Xavier canonized in 1622, by Pope Gregory XV. Laval had five brothers and two sisters. His youngest brother Henri entered the Benedictine Order and his sister Anne Charlotte entered the Congregation of Sisters of the Blessed Sacrament. He was a descendant of John of Brienne, Berengaria of León, Louis of Brienne, Guy VII de Laval and Matthew II of Montmorency.

Laval's mother served as an example of piety and encouraged him to be charitable to those who were less fortunate. Often described as destined for an ecclesiastical lifestyle, Laval was recognized as a clear-sighted and intelligent boy and he was admitted into the "privileged ranks of those who comprised the Congregation of the Holy Virgin." This was a society founded by the Jesuits, who aimed to inspire young people to adopt religious lifestyles, and encouraged regular prayer and spiritual practices. At the age of eight, Laval received the tonsure and took minor orders, which then allowed him to enter the College of La Flèche (Collège Henri-IV) in 1631, an institution that educated the sons of elite families and guaranteed him a good education. There Laval came into contact with reports of the Jesuit missions to the Huron in Canada, which inspired him to become a missionary, like his patron saint Francis Xavier.

In 1637, Laval was appointed a canon of the Cathedral of Évreux by the Bishop of Évreux. The death of Laval's father in September 1636 left his family in a precarious financial situation. François received revenue from the prebend attached to his position as a canon, which allowed him to continue his education. Once he completed his classical education at the age of nineteen, Laval left La Flèche to study philosophy and theology at the College de Clermont in Paris.

However the death of his two oldest brothers in the battles at Nördlingen in 1634 and Freiburg in 1644 made him the head of the family. His mother, the Bishop of Évreux, and his cousin all argued he should abandon his ecclesiastical career. Instead Laval helped his mother settle the family's affairs and renounced his rights of primogeniture, which then passed to his brother Jean-Louis.

Laval returned to his studies in Paris and on 1 May 1647 he was ordained a priest. The Bishop of Évreux, regretting his earlier attempt to persuade Laval to change his career path, appointed him archdeacon of his diocese in December 1647. In this post Laval oversaw 155 parishes and four chapels. Laval was said to approach this task with fervour and enthusiasm. In the following years, he devoted himself to establishing order in the parishes, providing relief for the poor, caring for the sick, and engaging in various charitable activities. In 1654, presented with the possibility of serving as a missionary in Asia, he resigned as archdeacon, but the project was abandoned and he was left without a clerical position. (Note: The noted Jesuit missionary Alexandre de Rhodes was looking for the pope's permission to appoint apostolic vicars in Tonkin and Indochina. He was sent to Rome where he remained for fifteen months. The Congregation for the Propagation of the Faith, which oversaw the missionary work of the Catholic Church and the Portuguese royal court jeopardized the mission and de Rhodes' project was abandoned by the end of 1654.)

Freed of all responsibility, Laval spent three years at a spiritual retreat near Caen known as the Hermitage, founded by Jean de Bernières-Louvigny, a lay leader in the reform of the Catholic Church in France. There he also made the acquaintance of the founder's nephew, Henri de Bernières, who became an invaluable assistant in later years. In addition to prayer and charitable work, he took on the responsibility of reforming a monastery whose morals were thought to be too lax and became the administrator of two monasteries of nuns. His dedication to these projects earned him commendation from François de Servien, Bishop of Bayeux, who described him as a priest "of great piety, prudent and of unusually great competence in business matters, [who had set] fine examples of virtue".

== New France ==
=== Background ===
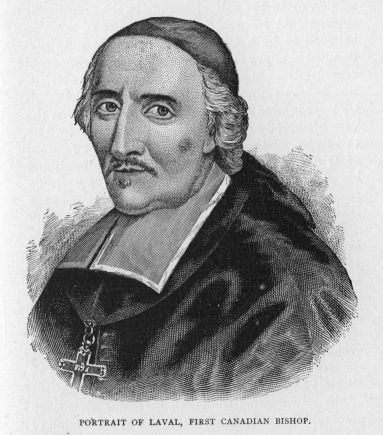
François de Laval

New France had no bishop for the first 50 years of its European settlement. Colonial religious officials, either Recollects or Jesuits, managed spiritual affairs. In 1646, under pressure from Rome, the Archbishop of Rouen was recognized as the authority over the Church in New France, but his authority was limited to granting faculties to clergy traveling to the colony. Yet no one denied the need for an established ecclesiastical presence.

Appointing a bishop was a contentious issue disputed between the Jesuits and the newly arrived Sulpicians. The former were quite accustomed to working independently and they believed a Sulpician bishop would make the Church in the colony subordinate to the Crown. The Sulpicians proposed one of their own, Gabriel Thubières de Levy de Queylus, as bishop, while the Jesuits supported Laval and gained royal approval easily with the support of the queen mother, Anne of Austria. Securing papal confirmation was another challenge.

The Holy See remained reserved regarding Laval's nomination, as the Congregation for the Propagation of the Faith wanted to assert papal authority in the colony rather than allow the Jesuits to exercise control in a new diocese that was part of the ecclesiastical structure of the Catholic Church in France. Instead of naming Laval bishop of the diocese of New France, he was made a bishop of a newly created apostolic vicariate, a type of jurisdiction directly managed by the Holy See through the Congregation for the Propagation of the Faith: the Apostolic Vicariate of New France.

=== Vicariate of New France ===
On 3 June 1658, the papal bulls were signed appointing Laval vicar apostolic of New France and titular bishop of Petra in Palestina. (Note: The language used in the 16th century was different from modern usage of the term "titular bishop". Laval was assigned an ancient abandoned see and named bishop in partibus infidelium ("in the lands of the unbelievers").) On 8 December 1658, in the church of the Abbey of Saint-Germain-des-Prés in Paris, Laval received his episcopal consecration from Cardinal Celio Piccolomini, Apostolic Nuncio to France, assisted by Bishop Hardouin de Péréfixe de Beaumont of Rodez and Bishop André du Saussay of Toul as co-consecrators. Laval took an oath of loyalty to the French king and sailed from La Rochelle for New France on 13 April 1659. On 16 June he arrived at Quebec. He began work immediately and on the day he arrived he baptized a young Huron and gave a dying man his last sacraments.

While small in size, the colony still provided a number of challenges to Laval. He found himself having to make concessions where he never thought to before to a population that, while scarce, was spread out, and was less inclined to continue under strict church discipline. Additionally, he had to deal with the Sulpician de Queylus, who had been managing Church affairs in the colony as vicar general under the authority of the Archbishop of Rouen, who continued to claim ecclesiastical jurisdiction over New France. De Queylus continued to assert his authority for nearly two years, while Laval repeatedly appealed to the king and the Holy See for support.

Laval struggled a great deal throughout his career to defend the church's power against state intrusion. Upon his arrival, Laval was adamant in asserting his primacy over the governor. He was immediately in opposition with Governor d’Argenson, particularly regarding ceremony and protocol. Also, the issue of selling alcohol to the natives further fueled their feud. Laval believed that intoxicated natives were an embarrassment to the colony and endangered the lives of those around them. He quickly imposed the threat of excommunication on those who continued to deal in this trade. Governor D’Argenson abhorred this action, deeming it an intrusion of church into state affairs.

D’Argenson soon resigned and was replaced by d’Avaugour, who, in order to avoid any conflict with Laval, decreed harsh penalties against anyone caught selling alcohol to the natives. One such case was that of Daniel Vuil, who was executed in October 1661 after Laval had excommunicated Vuil in February for religious offences. Laval was displeased, believing that excommunication was a far more humane consequence. When alcohol was again being sold freely to natives, in a moment of despair over the state of New France, Laval departed for France in August 1662 to consult with King Louis XIV on the matter. Laval succeeded in bringing about d’Avaugour's recall the following year.

When Laval returned to New France he had increased powers. King Louis XIV had assured Laval that he would have a future appointment as bishop, requested that he establish a Sovereign Council in Quebec, and even asked Laval to choose New France's next governor. For governor, Laval chose Chevalier de Mézy, a friend from his time at the Hermitage of Caen. In the developing Sovereign Council, which held its first session 18 September 1663, Mézy represented the first figure of authority, followed by Laval, and Gaudais-Dupon, commissioner. Laval appointed Mézy hoping to have an ally among high-ranking state official. In the trade of alcohol to the natives he did find in Mézy an ally; together the two forbade the trading of alcohol. However, constituting the Sovereign Council revealed that the two represented conflicting interests in matters of church and state. Soon, another conflict between Laval and governor ensued, leading Laval to take to the streets with drums to tell his version of the feud. Upon Mézy's death, the Sovereign council was reorganized. Intendant Jean Talon was added, and immediately assumed the functions previously exercised by Laval. With this change in the council Laval began to attend the council's meetings less frequently; from then on Laval retreated somewhat from state affairs and focused purely on ecclesiastical matters.

One of Laval's principal projects as apostolic vicar was the education and training of priests and church administrators. The Major Seminary of Quebec opened on 26 March 1663. Affiliated with the Séminaire des Missions Étrangères, in Paris. In October 1668, Laval added a minor seminary to train boys It was meant to train boys who might have priestly vocation both of French and indigenous origins. It opened with eight French students and six Huron, but grew quickly as French missionaries, especially Sulpicians, arrived to serve as teachers. Laval wanted these teachers to spread the word that his institution was to establish a sense of charity and love for religion in the colony and not another source of law or authority.

Laval's view of the Grand Séminaire was greater than a mere teaching academy. He hoped that it would become a home for all parochial priests. Laval encouraged them to see it as their true home and as a place to which they may turn to in sickness or old age. Furthermore, he wanted the seminary to become a paymaster for all priests and parishes, which meant that it had to be well funded. In order to accomplish this feat, Laval donated most of his own fortune to the seminary since it had now become his home as well. He also convinced the king, Louis XIV, to give him the income of three different abbeys in France. Moreover, since his institution was expected to pay off all priests, Laval thought it would be normal to receive the incomes levied by their parishes. This idea was however met with a lot of resistance from the population, which was not accustomed to contributing to the upkeep of religious institutions. His original goal of demanding a tax worth one-thirteenth of the produce of farms was met with violent resistance, which forced him to reduce it to one-twenty-sixth.

Laval shared a large part of his administrative work with other clerics to develop their experience. To lead the seminary he appointed his companion from France, Henri de Bernière, linking this role with Bernière's other assignment a pastor of the parish of Quebec. Furthermore, he also appointed five other directors who would form the bishop's advisory body.

In 1668 he appointed the previously troublesome de Queylus as the first Superior of a new seminary in Ville-Marie. Around the same time he founded a school of arts and crafts at Saint-Joachim to provide practical education for craftsmen and farmers.

== Diocese of Quebec ==
In 1674, fifteen years after his arrival in New France, Laval asked that the vicariate be promoted to a diocese. The Holy See established the Diocese of Quebec on 1 October 1674, naming Laval as its first bishop.

He revisited the issue of alcohol sales to the indigenous peoples. In 1675, Laval, over the objections of Governor Louis de Buade de Frontenac, excommunicated all who sold alcohol to them. On 24 May 1679 Laval succeeded in obtaining a royal decree banning the trade.

In 1678, he obtained a royal edict stating that permanent curacies would be established in the colony. In 1681, he drew up the boundaries of parishes.

== Retirement ==
Laval eventually realised that his health was declining and that he could no longer run his large diocese, which extended from Acadia to Lake Michigan. In 1688, he passed on his responsibilities as bishop to Jean-Baptiste de La Croix de Chevrières de Saint-Vallier.

Laval continued to collaborate with the colony's high religious authorities, until his last days. He helped the poor with his presence and his gifts of charity. He never missed a Mass or a day of fasting, despite his ever declining health. By 1707, he had developed an ulcer which eventually took his life on 6 May 1708. His body was placed in a coffin in the cathedral; however his heart was kept in the chapel of the seminary to which he had dedicated most of his life and fortune.

== Veneration ==
Saint François de Laval
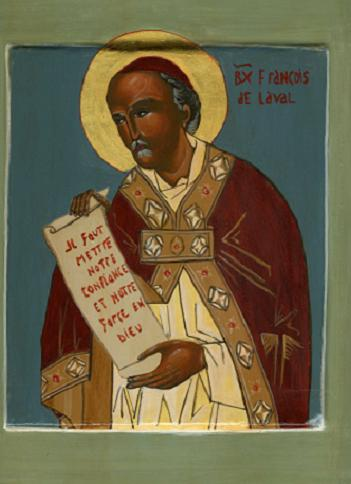
- Icon of St François de Laval

Bishop of Québec
- Born: 30 April 1623; Montigny-sur-Avre, Perche, Kingdom of France
- Died: 6 May 1708 (aged 85); Quebec, Viceroyalty of New France, French colonial empire
- Venerated in: Catholic Church
- Canonized: 3 April 2014, Apostolic Palace, Vatican City by Pope Francis
- Major shrine: Cathedral-Basilica of Notre-Dame de Québec
- Feast: 6 May
- Attributes: Episcopal attire
- Patronage: Bishops of Canada

Laval's remains have been entombed in a shrine for personal veneration in the Cathedral-Basilica of Notre-Dame de Québec. His cause was formally opened on 24 September 1890, granting him the title of Servant of God. He was beatified by Pope John Paul II in 1980. He was granted Equivalent canonization on 3 April 2014 by Pope Francis.

In 1663, Laval founded Séminaire de Québec and in 1852 it was named renamed to Université Laval in his honour. The city of Laval, Quebec, immediately north of Montreal, is also named after him.

== Notes ==
Catholic Church titles
New creation	Apostolic Vicar of Quebec; 8 December 1658 – 1 October 1674	Vicariate promoted to diocese
New creation	Bishop of Quebec; 1 October 1674 – 24 January 1688	Succeeded by Jean-Baptiste de la Croix de Chevrières de Saint-Vallier
