= Carrera (surname) =

Carrera, de la Carrera or Karrera is a surname originated in Venice, Italy. Later, also a Basque surname from Alegría de Oria and Amezketa, in Guipúzcoa (Basque Country, Spain). Other references show that it is also a Castilian surname and there is evidence that the name originated in Barcelona in Catalonia, in northeastern Spain. It is also encountered in Occitan, being rendered as Carrère in French. It may refer to:

== Persons ==
- Asia Carrera (1973–), American porn star
- Barbara Carrera (1945–), Nicaraguan-American actress
- Carmen Carrera (1985-), American model
- Carrera family, Chilean family prominent in the Chilean War of Independence
  - José Miguel Carrera (1785–1821), hero of the Chilean War of Independence
  - Luis Carrera (1791–1818), military leader in the Chilean War of Independence
- Evelyn Carrera (1971–), Dominican Republic volleyball player
- Félix Rigau Carrera (1884–1954), First Puerto Rican aviator
- Fernando Carrera (1966–), Minister of Foreign Affairs Guatemala 2013–2014
- Gonzalo Carrera (contemporary), Spanish rock musician resident in London / United Kingdom
- Ignacio Carrera Pinto (1848–1882), hero of the Chilean Army
- Javiera Carrera (1771–1862), hero of the Chilean war of Independence
- Juan Ignacio Carrera (1981-), Argentine footballer.
- Juan Luis Carrera (contemporary), American musician and recording engineer
- Leonardo Carrera (a.k.a. Damián 666) (1961–), Mexican professional wrestler
- Leonardo Carrera (a.k.a. Bestia 666) (1989–), Mexican professional wrestler
- Martín Carrera (1806–1871), President of Mexico briefly in 1855
- Massimo Carrera (1964-), Italian football player and coach
- Mercedes Carrera (1982–), American Pornstar
- Norberto Rivera Carrera (1942–), Mexican Roman Catholic archbishop and cardinal
- Pietro Carrera (1573–1647), Sicilian chess player, priest, and author
- Rafael Carrera (1814–1865), ruler of Guatemala 1839–1865
- Sebastián Carrera (1978-), Argentine footballer.
- Tia Carrera (1967–), Filipina-American actress

=== Fictional characters ===
- Carrera, succubus character from video games Viper GTS
- Kiara “Kie” Carrera, a character in the Netflix series Outer Banks
- Sally Carrera, character from the Disney/Pixar film Cars

== See also ==
- Carrero (disambiguation)
- Carriera
