= Pierre-Louis Billaudèle =

Canadian priest (1796–1869)

Pierre-Louis Billaudèle (20 November 1796 – 19 October 1869) was a priest from, and educated in, France who spent over 30 years of his service in Canada.

Billaudèle received extensive education and religious training and became an educator as the director of the Petit Séminaire de Charleville, where he had studied. He became a Sulpician there during his tenure. He moved from there to the Grand Séminaire de Clermont-Ferrand where he spent a number of years before accepting an appointment to Montreal.

Pierre-Louis arrived in Canada in 1837 with two other Sulpician priests and the initial four Canadian members of a Roman Catholic religious teaching congregation, the Brothers of the Christian Schools. He was soon made the director of the first Grand Séminaire de Montréal. He was eventually succeeded by Joseph-Alexandre Baile in that position.

In 1846 he was elected superior of the Sulpicians in Canada replacing Joseph-Vincent Quiblier.
