= Marie-Paule Belle =

French singer (1946–2026)

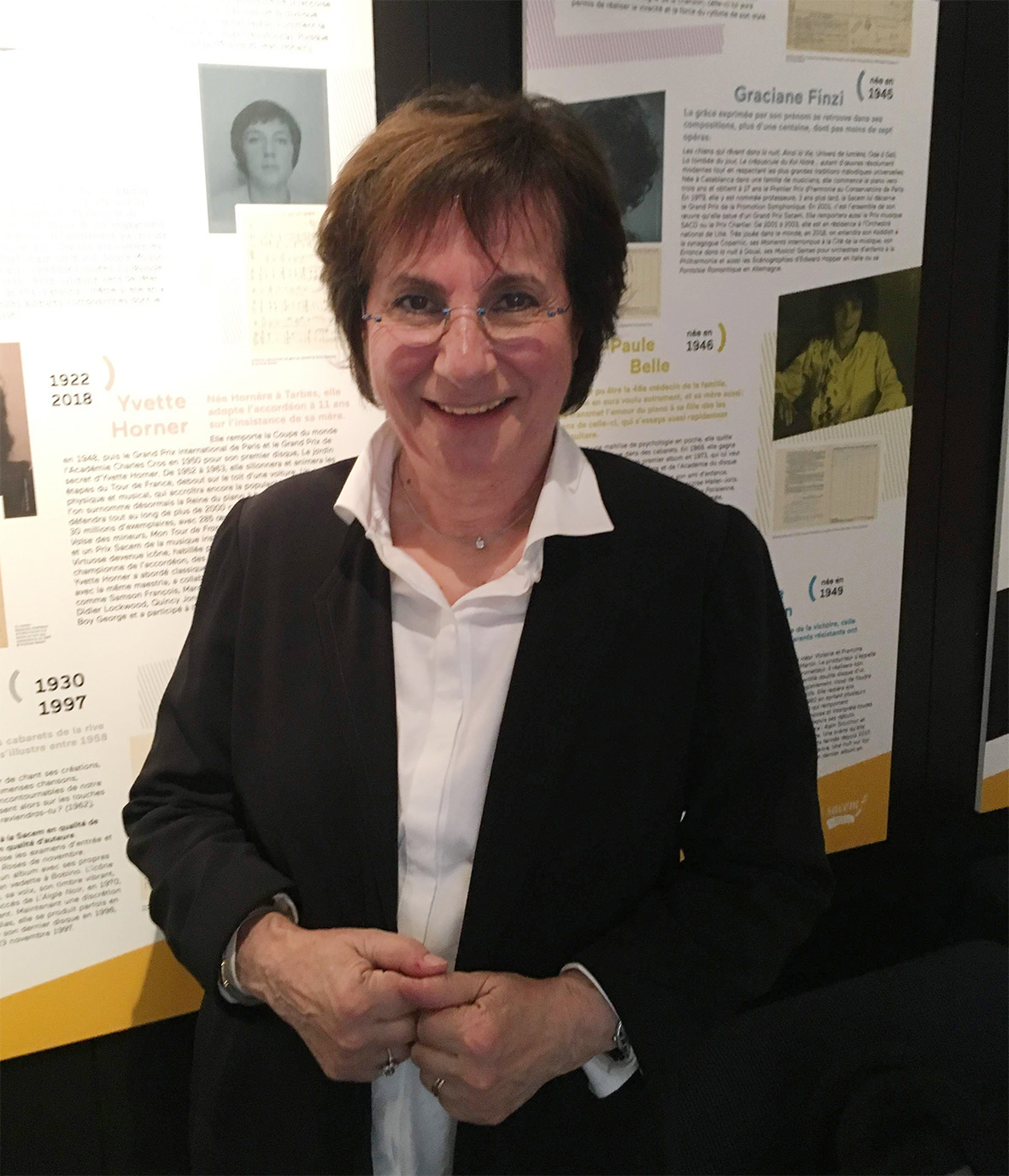
- Belle in 2019

Background information
- Born: 25 January 1946; Pont-Sainte-Maxence, France
- Died: 25 July 2026 (aged 80) Neuilly-sur-Seine, France
- Cause of death: Breast cancer
- Genres: Chanson, French pop
- Occupations: Singer; pianist; composer
- Instruments: Vocals; piano; guitar
- Works: La Parisienne
- Years active: 1969–2026
- Labels: Polydor; Carrère; Philips
- Partner: Françoise Mallet-Joris
- Awards: Commandeur de l'Ordre des Arts et des Lettres (2022); Officier de l'Ordre national du Mérite (1988)
- Website: www.mariepaulebelle.com

Marie-Paule Belle (25 January 1946 – 25 July 2026) was a French singer, pianist and composer. She was best known for her 1976 hit song "La Parisienne".

== Early life and career ==
Marie-Paule Belle was born in Pont-Sainte-Maxence on 25 January 1946. She lived in Nice from the age of 8 until 23. She got a master's degree in psychology. After that, she went to Paris to continue her studies, and started to enter her acting career when she performed in cabarets such as L'Échelle de Jacob and L'Écluse.

Belle started her television career in 1969 after winning a television competition at the Radio Monte-Carlo, in which she had competed after a bet with her friends from university. She then recorded her first 45 rpm record with CBS Disques, and then a second with La Boîte à Musique. Her first appearance on French television was in 1971 on the programme Aujourd'hui Madame on the second channel of the Office de Radiodiffusion Télévision Française. She released her first LP in 1973 by Sonopresse and won the Académie Charles Cros and the Académie du Disque Award. In the same year, she appeared on Philippe Bouvard's show Samedi soir, where she was asked to sing two songs, instead of one, which was planned.

In 1974, Belle received the Grand Prix de la chanson française in Spa, awarded by the Public Francophone Radios. In 1975, she met Serge Lama when she was performing at L'Écluse. She then embarked on a tour with him throughout France. In 1976, her song La Parisienne became a popular hit and was performed at Olympia in 1978, and then performed again at the Théâtre des Variétés in 1980. She recorded another two 45 rpm records, one of which was for children and released in 1978 by Adès Records. It included two sing-along fables written and narrated by the writer Françoise Mallet-Joris.

In 1981, Belle's contract with Polydor ended, which is the record label with which she had achieved her biggest record sales success. Then, she signed a contract with Carrère. In 1982, a 45 rpm single was released for the Philips Records, in which her most famous song, "La Parisienne", became an advertising slogan. From 1981 to 1987, Belle released three studio albums and one live album, as well as eight 45 rpm records, but only her cover of La Biaiseuse achieved a popularity in 1982. However, she continued to perform frequently in concert.

In 1987, she published a short autobiography called Je ne suis pas parisienne, ça me gêne… with Carrère-Lafon while Françoise Mallet-Joris, her partner, dedicated a book to her with Seghers Publishing in the Poetry and Songs collection. From 1987 to 1997, a parody version of La Parisienne, performed by Belle herself, served as the theme song for the program Matin Bonheur on France 2. In 1988, she was made a Ordre des Arts et des Lettres, and later decorated with the Ordre national du Mérite.

In 2010, Belle created a new show called De Belle à Barbara, composed of half her own repertoire and half of Barbara's songs. She performed it notably at the Alhambra, and in the nearby provinces, and in Luxembourg, Belgium and Switzerland. She was a member of the jury for the first edition of the Barbara Prize, awarded by Minister Frédéric Mitterrand.

== Personal life and death ==
From 1970 to 1981, Marie-Paule Belle was the partner of novelist Françoise Mallet-Joris, who was also her lyricist. In 2020, she published Comme si tu étais toujours là, a book written in homage to her former partner, who died in 2016.

Belle died from breast cancer in Neuilly-sur-Seine, on 25 July 2026, at the age of 80.
