= Roman Colleges =

Papal seminaries in Rome

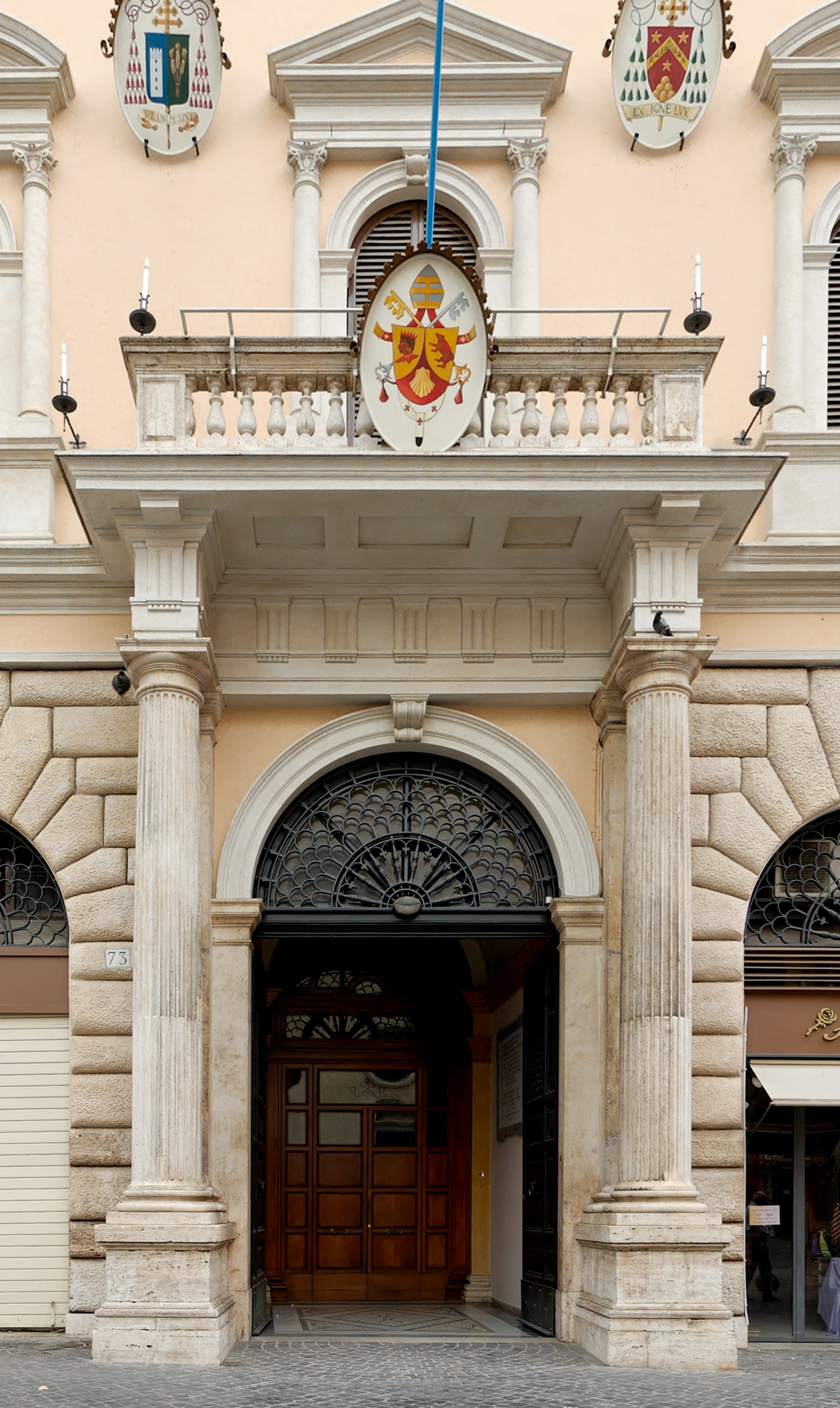
Entrance of the Pontifical Ecclesiastical Academy.

The Roman Colleges, also referred to as the Pontifical Colleges in Rome, are seminary institutions established and maintained in Rome for the education of future ecclesiastics of the Catholic Church. Many of the colleges have traditionally taken students from particular national or ethnic groups, those from particular regions in Italy, and those from the various Eastern Catholic churches. The colleges are halls of residence in which the students follow the usual seminary exercises of piety, study in private, and review the subjects treated in class.

In some colleges there are special courses of instruction (languages, music, archaeology, etc.) but the regular courses in philosophy and theology are given in a few large central institutions, such as Pontifical Urbaniana University, the Pontifical Gregorian University, the Pontifical Lateran University, and the Pontifical University of Saint Thomas Aquinas, known as the Angelicum.

== Purpose ==
The Roman colleges, in addition to the obvious advantages for study which Rome offers, allow the students to have a different experience of university life from that of their respective countries. They also serve in a certain measure to maintain contact between the various countries and the Holy See. With this end in view, various popes have encouraged the founding of colleges in which young men of the same nationality might reside and at the same time profit from the opportunities that the city affords.

The rector of the Kraków seminary, in bidding Karol Wojtyla farewell, said that theology can be learned elsewhere, but a priest in Rome must "learn Rome itself."

Each national college has as its head a rector designated by the episcopate of the country to which the college belongs and appointed by the pope. He is assisted by a vice-rector and a spiritual director.

== Program of studies ==
Most colleges follow similar academic programs during the year, but variations will be found, and these are due chiefly to natural characteristics or to the special purpose for which the college was established.

During the first three years of study, seminarians study for a Bachelor of Sacred Theology/S.T.B.) degree at either the Pontifical Gregorian University, the Pontifical University of Saint Thomas Aquinas (Angelicum), or the Pontifical University of the Holy Cross (Santa Croce). In most of the courses the lecture system is followed. All the required courses of the S.T.B. program at the Gregorian and Santa Croce are taught in Italian. The Angelicum offers two separate tracks, one in English and one in Italian.

== Inter-college activities ==
Not only do seminarians from the different colleges follow their studies in the same universities, they also take part in extra-curricular seminars and conferences as well as leisure activities such as the Clericus Cup, a football (soccer) tournament created in 2007 that provides a venue for friendly athletic competition among the thousands of seminarians, representing nearly a hundred countries, who study in Rome.

== List of colleges ==
=== Almo Collegio Capranica ===
The Almo Collegio Capranica is the oldest Roman college, founded in 1417 by Cardinal Domenico Capranica in his own palace for 31 young clerics, who received an education suitable for the formation of good priests. Capranica himself drew up their rules and presented the college with his own library, the more valuable portion of which was later transferred to the Vatican. Students living at the Capranica pursued theological studies at the nearby Sapienza. As of 2016, the college had about fifty students, primarily from dioceses in Italy.

=== Vocational Pontifical colleges ===
==== Pontificio Collegio Urbano ====
The Pontificio Collegio Urbano "De Propaganda Fide" (Urban College) was established in Rome in 1622 in order to train missionaries to be sent around the world. All students of the Urban College have a full scholarship, lodging, accommodation and academic fees. After completion of studies the newly ordained priests would return to their homeland. As of 2016 the Urban College had about 165 students, most from Asia and Africa.

Besides students from the dioceses of different continents, there are also seminarians of various Churches sui iuris such as the Syro-Malabar, Syro-Malankara, Coptic and Chaldean churches. In April 2015, thirteen seminarians of the Syro-Malabar Church received minor orders: the subdiaconate and diaconate from Joseph Pallikaparampil, Bishop emeritus of Palai, India.

Originally, the college occupied a premises adjacent to the Spanish Steps. If there were not enough pupils from a particular country to constitute a national college, the students would be housed at the Urbana.

==== Pontifical Ecclesiastical Academy ====
The Pontifical Ecclesiastical Academy (Pontificia Ecclesiastica Academia) is one of the Roman Colleges of the Roman Catholic Church. The academy is dedicated to training priests to serve in the diplomatic corps and the Secretariat of State of the Holy See.

=== Regional Pontifical Colleges ===
Traditionally, most of the colleges were divided among the regions from which the seminarians came. Nowadays, most colleges have opened up to seminarians from other regions of the world with cultural or linguistic ties to their own.

==== Pontificio Seminario Romano Maggiore ====
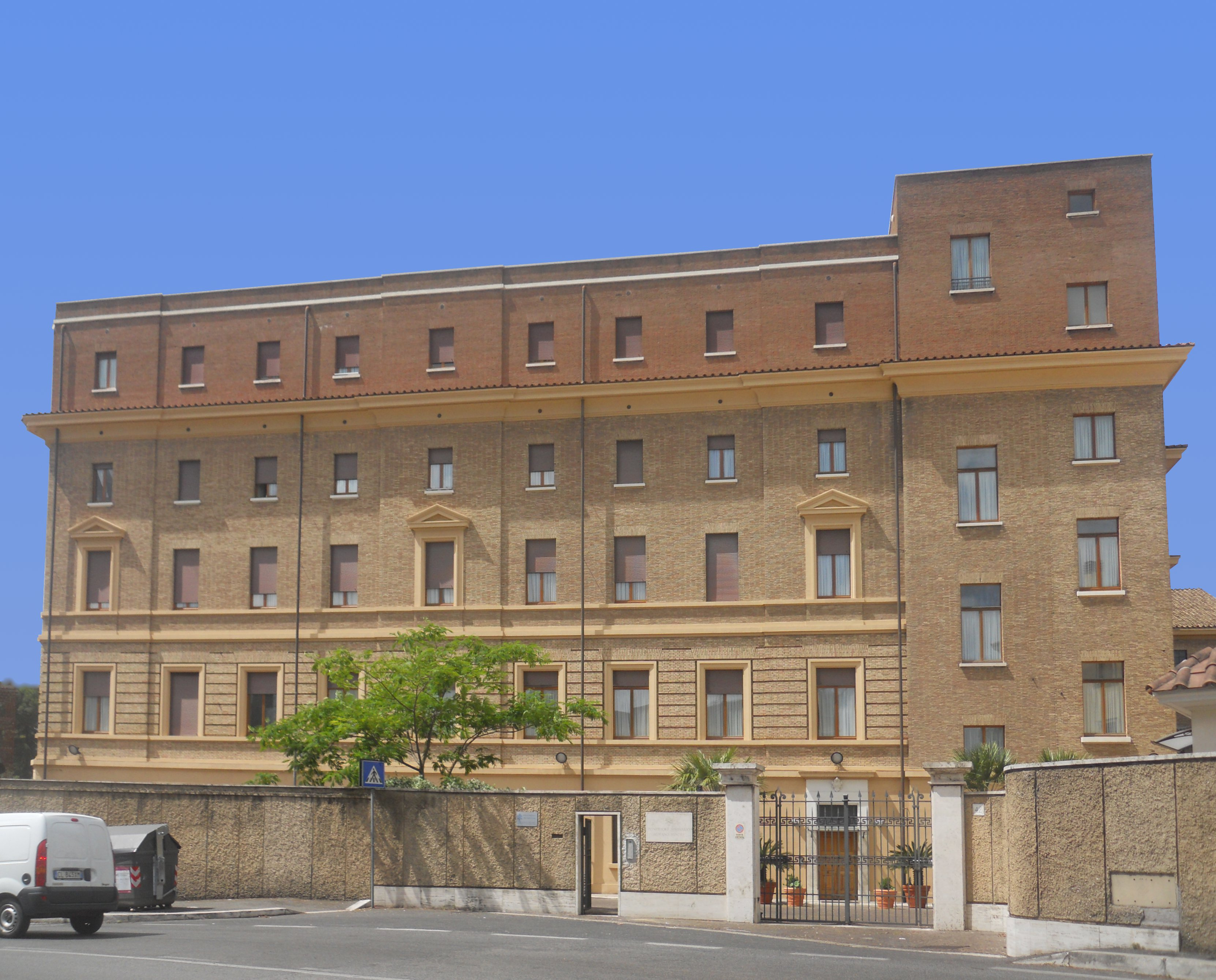
Pontificio Seminario Romano Minore

The Roman Seminary (Pontificio Collegio Romano) is the major seminary of the diocese of Rome. The Council of Trent in its 23rd session decreed the establishment of diocesan seminaries. Its history can be traced to the Roman Seminary established by Pope Pius IV in 1565. In 1913, the Roman Seminary was merged with Pontificio Seminario Pio to form the Pontificio Seminario Romano Maggiore which was established in a new building at the Lateran. The patroness of the Major Seminary is the Blessed Virgin Mary under the title Madonna della Fiducia (Our Lady of Trust).

==== Pontificio Seminario Romano Minore ====
The Pontificio Seminario Romano Minore is the minor seminary for the diocese of Rome. It was founded in 1913 with the merger of the minor division of the "Roman Seminary" with the Vatican Seminary. It is located just outside the rear walls of Vatican City at Viale Vaticano, 42; and constitutes an extraterritorial zone of the Holy See. The present Rector is Father Roberto Zammerini. The patroness of the Minor Seminary is the Blessed Virgin Mary under the title Madonna della Perseveranza (Our Lady of Perseverance).

==== Pontificio Seminario Lombardo dei SS. Ambrogio e Carlo ====
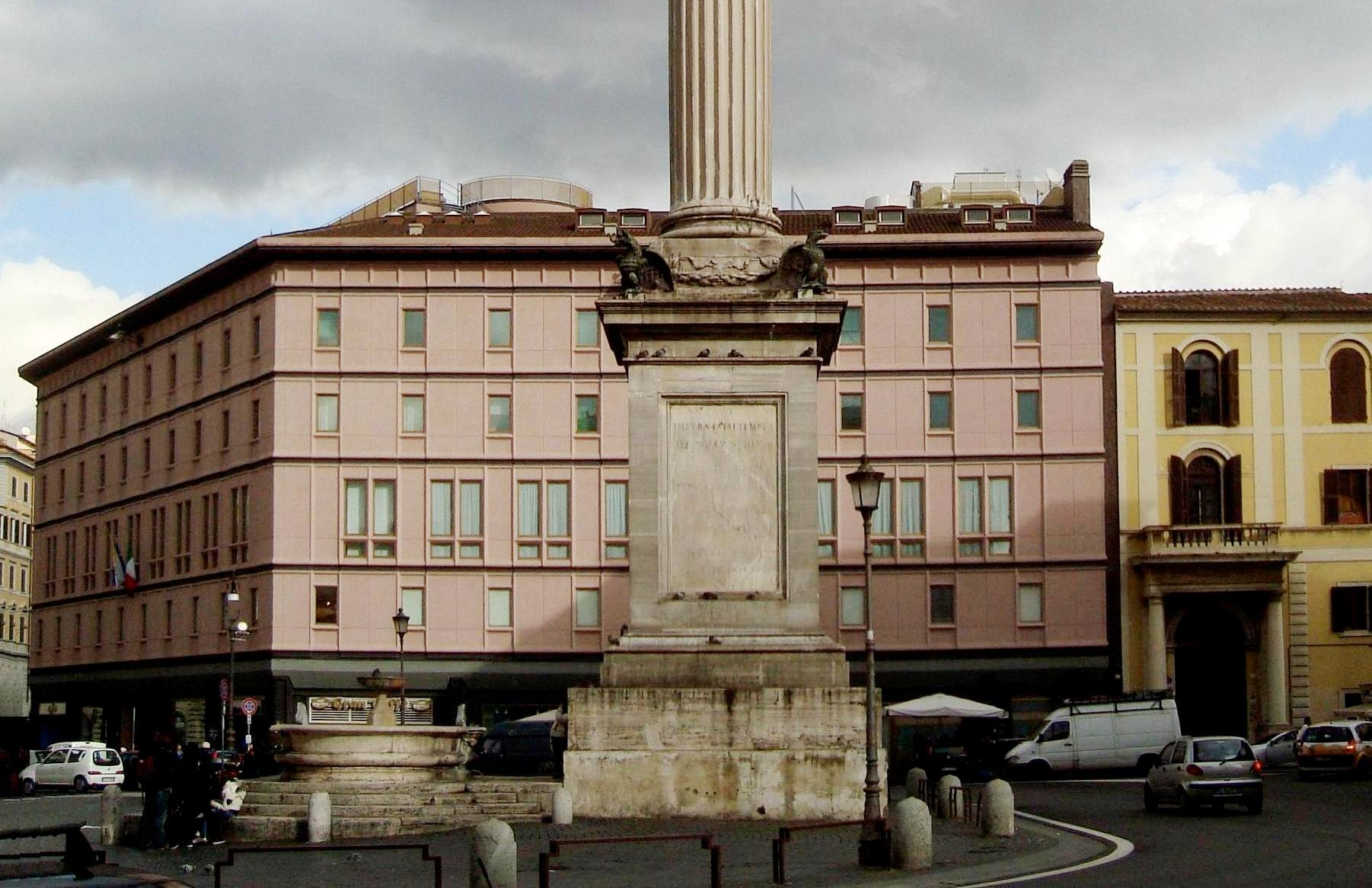
Lombard Seminary

The Seminario Lombardo dei SS. Ambrogio e Carlo (PSL), founded in 1863 chiefly through the generosity of Cardinal Edoardo Borromeo and Duke Scotti of Milan, was located in the palace of the confraternity of S. Carlo al Corso. The first community was made up of 12 students, some already priests and other clerics in holy orders, who attended the various institutions of higher education, in particular Apollinaris and the Gregorian. They offered their liturgical service also to the annexed Basilica of San Carlo al Corso. The Lombardo was merged temporarily with the Roman Seminary from 1913 to 1920, when it was re-established as a separate college.

The PSL was relocated to its present location overlooking the square in front of the Basilica of Santa Maria Maggiore, in the Esquilino area, in 1965 and blessed by Paul VI. In 2006 the community was made up of more than 50 priests and deacons from every diocese in Lombardy.

=== Other Colleges ===
==== Pontificio Collegio Armeno ====
The Armenian College in Rome (Pontificio Collegio Armeno) was founded in 1883 by Pope Leo XIII. Before then, Armenian students were housed at the Urbana. The college was granted the Church of S. Nicola da Tolentino in the Trevi district. The Pontifical Armenian College and the Armenian Church of St. Nicholas of Tolentino are an important center for the Armenian community of Rome. Three Armenian Catholic patriarchs were students of the college. The colleges has hosted five synods of the Armenia Catholic hierarchy.

==== Pontificio Collegio Belga ====
The Belgian College in Rome (Pontificio Collegio Belga) is the national seminary for Belgian seminarians. It was established in 1844 through the initiative of Aerts, who was aided by the papal nuncio in Belgium, Gioacchino Pecci (later to become Pope Leo XIII), and the Belgian bishops. At first it was located in the home of Aerts, rector of the Belgian national Church of S. Guiliano. In 1845 the ancient monastery of Saints Gioacchino e Anna at the Quattro Fontane was purchased. When Karol Wojtyla came to Rome in 1946, he lived at the Belgian College on the Via del Quirinale while pursuing studies at the Angelicum. The college has since re-located to the Via Giambattista. The Belgian episcopate supports the seminarians and proposes the seminary's rector.

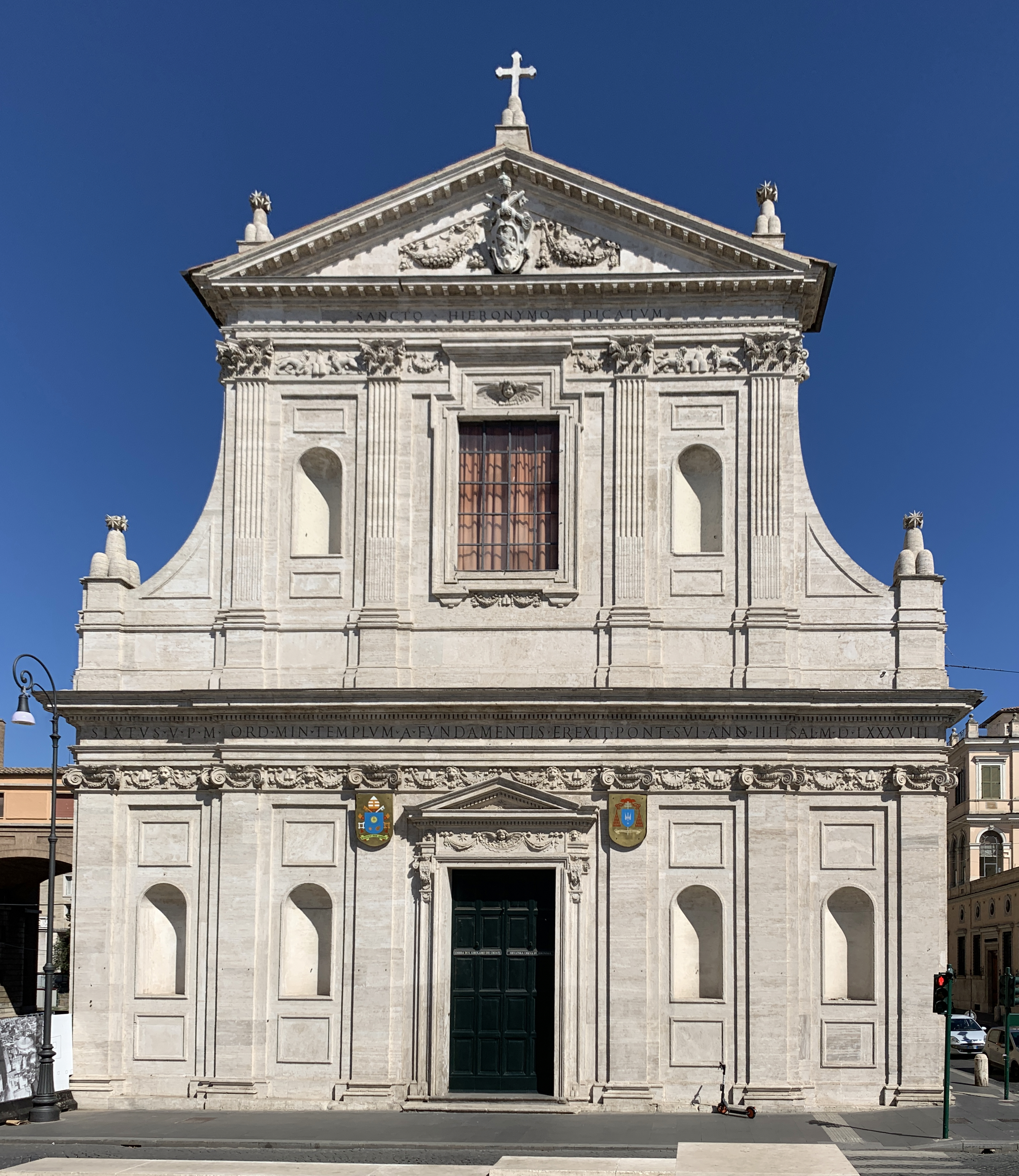
The Pontifical Croatian College of St. Jerome

==== Collegio Croato Di San Girolamo ====
The Croatian College in Rome (Pontificio Collegio Di san Giralmo) was established in 1863 by Pope Pius IX to prepare priests for Dalmatia, Croatia, Bosnia, and Slavonia, and was located in the Illyrian hospice near the Church of S. Girolamo degli Schiavoni; but after a few years no more students were received. In 1900, Leo XIII reorganized the Illyrian hospice and decided to form a college of priests of the above-mentioned provinces, who would attend to the services in the church and at the same time pursue ecclesiastical studies.

==== Collegio Etiopico ====
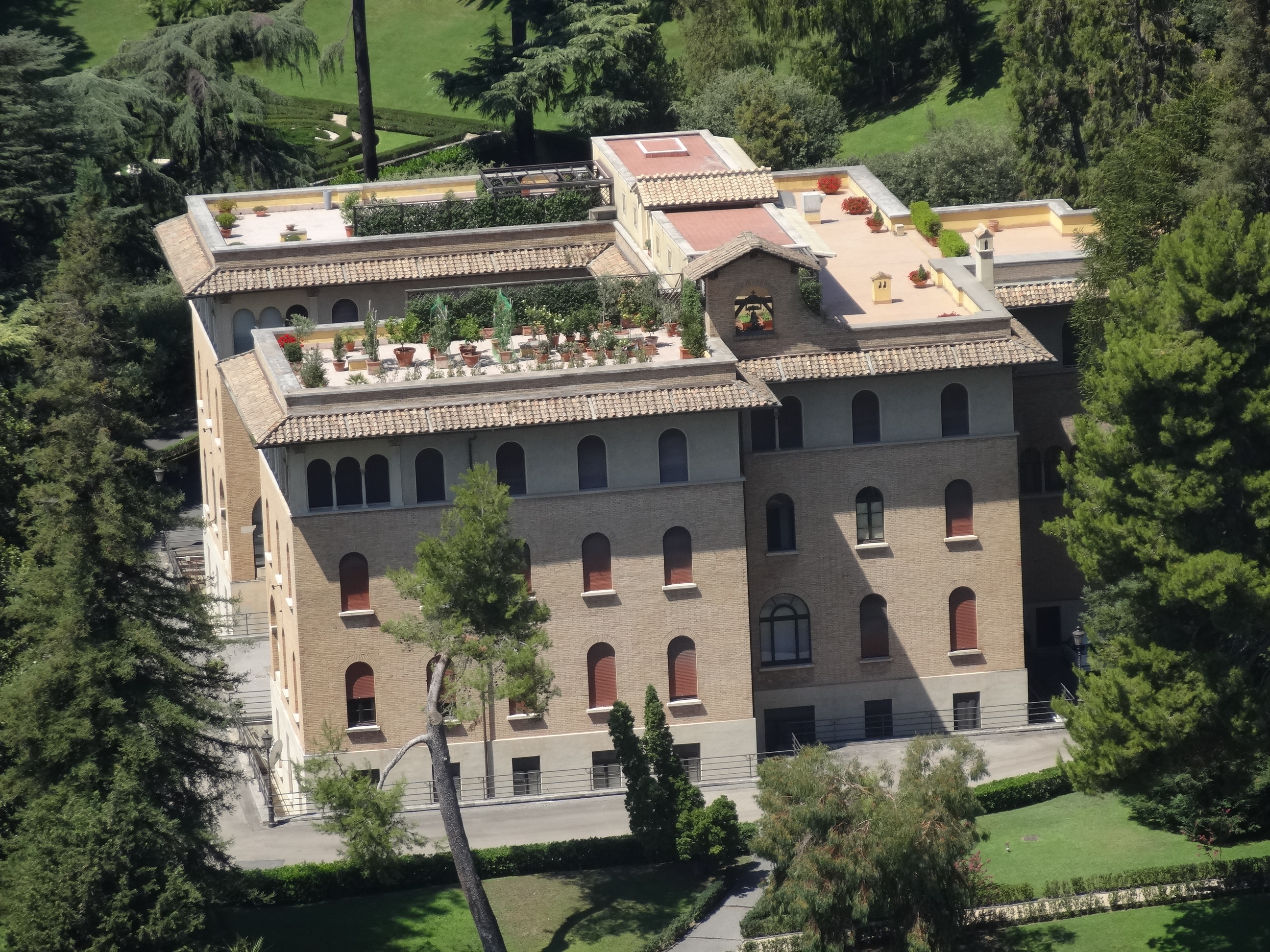
Pontifical Ethiopian College in the Vatican

The Pontifical Ethiopian College dates to the arrival in Rome of Ethiopian pilgrims in the 15th century. In 1481, Pope Sixtus IV granted those pilgrims, most of whom were monks, Santo Stefano degli Abissini with the outlying building just behind the apse of St. Peter's Basilica. Under Pope Leo X both the Church and the house were turned to a monastery for Ethiopian monks. The monastery of St. Stephen became an important center of Ethiopian studies and culture. For the first time printing in Ge’ez (Ethiopic) characters took place there with the publication of the Psalms in 1513 and later the New Testament in 1548–9. Many Ethio-Eritrean scholars attained their knowledge and necessary information from the members of that community; some of them were very learned men. They owned several pergameneous Codices, which are now in the Vatican Library. Pope Benedict XV, having instituted the Congregation for the Eastern Churches in 1917, decided to found also Oriental Colleges in Rome.

Accordingly, in 1919, on the suggestion of Beccari, he established the Ethiopian College in the old Monastery of St. Stephen of the Abyssinians. Camillo Carrara, the Apostolic Vicar of Eritrea, sent the first group of students, who were from Eritrea and the Apostolic Prefecture of Tigray. Because of the small number of students it could lodge and partly because the site was very damp and unhealthy, Pope Pius XI decided to build a new and larger house for them. He chose the location in the middle of the Vatican garden, indicating the spot where he ordered the construction of the new college, and on 31 May 1929 in the presence of 12 cardinals and several prelates the laying of the foundation stone took place. The Ethiopian clergy were represented by Abba Kidanemariam Kassa, Apostolic pro-Vicar of Eritrea, who later was consecrated bishop in the chapel of the newly built College. On 30 October 1929, the pope granted citizenship of the Vatican City to all members of the college. Eight students who died during their schooling are buried in the Church of St. Ann.

Pope Benedict XVI participated and gave his benediction on the 75th anniversary of the foundation of the college in 2005 in the presence of all bishops from Ethiopia and Eritrea. The college was also the meeting place of the Episcopal Conference of the Bishops of Ethiopia and Eritrea. At present, as from its beginning, there are priests from both Ethiopia and Eritrea for their higher learning in the college. The patron of the college is Saint Giustino de Jacobis.

==== Collegio Filippino ====
The Filipino College in Rome (Pontificio Collegio Seminario de Nuestra Señora de la Paz y Buen Viaje) is the college of Filipino diocesan priests studying in Rome. It was formally established as an institution with pontifical rights by Pope John XXIII on June 29, 1961, through the papal bull Sancta Mater Ecclesia. Pope John XXIII blessed and inaugurated the modern edifice located at 490 Via Aurelia, on October 7, 1961, the Feast of Our Lady of the Rosary.

==== Seminario Francese ====
The French Seminary in Rome (Pontificio Seminario Francese) was founded in 1853 on the initiative of the French bishops in order to train French seminarians who were able to counteract Gallican influence. For many years it was run by the Congregation of the Holy Ghost. Many of the lectures are at the Gregorian University. Leo XIII declared it a pontifical seminary in 1902. Disaffected conservative seminarians from the French Seminary formed the core of the Catholic traditionalist group the Society of Saint Pius X.

==== Collegio Germanico-Ungarico ====
The German-Hungarian College (Pontificio Collegio Germanico-Ungarico) was founded by Cardinal Giovanni Morone and Ignatius Loyola. The first students were received in November 1552. In January 1574, Pope Gregory XIII granted the Palazzo di Sant'Apollinare in the Piazza Navona to the Jesuits as the seat of the Germanic College. In 1580, the German college was united to the Hungarian college. The collegium is a German-speaking seminary for Catholic priests run by the Jesuits. Santo Stefano al Monte Celio is both the Hungarian national church in Rome, and the rectory church of the college.

==== Collegio Teutonico ====
The Collegio Teutonico or German College is the Pontifical College established for future ecclesiastics of German nationality. It is divided into two separate colleges; the Pontificio Collegio Teutonico di S. Maria dell’ Anima and the Collegio Teutonico del Campo Santo.

==== Pontificio Collegio Teutonico del Campo Santo ====
It was established in 1399 and maintained at the Vatican for the education of future ecclesiastics of the Catholic Church of German nationality. Residents pursue their studies for two years officiate at the adjacent Church of Santa Maria della Pietà in Camposanto dei Teutonici.

==== Pontificio Collegio Teutonico di S. Maria dell' Anima ====
In 1859, a college of chaplains to officiate in the church of Santa Maria dell' Anima was established; the chaplains were to remain only two or at the most three years, and at the same time were to continue their studies. They devoted themselves chiefly to canon law with a view to employing their knowledge in the service of their respective dioceses; and they receive living and tuition gratis. Other priests also were admitted who come to Rome at their own expense for the purpose of study. The college continued to assist poor Germans who come to Rome, either to visit the holy places or in search of occupation.

==== Collegio Greco ====
The Greek College in Rome (Pontificio Collegio Greco) was founded by Gregory XIII, who established it to receive young Greeks belonging to any nation in which the Greek Rite was used, and consequently for Greek refugees in Italy as well as the Ruthenians and Melkites of Egypt and the Levant.

==== Collegio Inglese ====
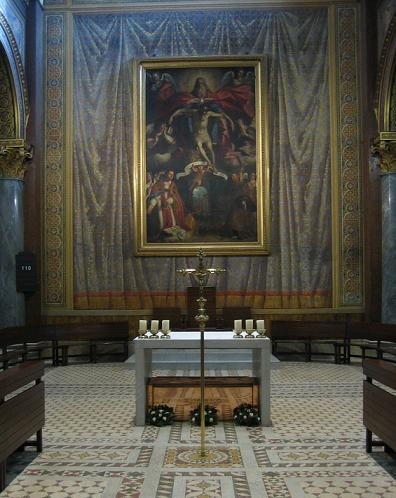
Church of the Venerable English College, Rome

The English College in Rome (Venerabile Collegio Inglese) was created for the training of priests for England and Wales. Founded in 1579, it is the oldest English institution anywhere outside England. Pope Gregory XIII converted the Hospital of St. Thomas into a college for the education of secular priests for the English mission.

The Beda College (Pontificio Collegio Beda) is united to the English College and intended for mature candidates ("second-career") and converted clergymen wishing to prepare for the priesthood. It was founded in 1852 by Pius IX. The Beda is the responsibility of the Bishops of England and Wales, but has opened its doors to receive men from English-speaking countries worldwide. The college mission has always been to help older men adapt as Catholic priests.

==== Collegio Irlandese ====
The Irish College in Rome (Pontificio Collegio Irlandese) was founded on 1 January 1628 for the training of Irish seminarians.

==== Collegio Latino-Americano ====
The Latin American College in Rome (Collegio Pio-Latino-Americano Pontificio) was founded on 21 November 1858, for students from Central and South America.

==== Collegio Pio-Brasiliano ====
The Collegio Pio-Brasiliano, the Brazilian College in Rome (Pontificio Collegio Pio-Brasiliano) was separated from the South American College by Pope Pius XI in 1934 and is run by Brazilian Jesuits for Brazilian seminarians.

==== Collegio dei Maroniti ====
The Maronite College in Rome (Pontificio Collegio dei Maroniti) was founded by Gregory XIII in 1584, and had its first site near the Church of S. Maria della Ficoccia near the Piazza di Trevi. It was richly endowed by Sixtus V and Cardinal Antonio Carafa, and also by other popes, and was entrusted to the Jesuits; the pupils attended the Gregorian University. During the Revolution of 1798 the college was suppressed, and the Maronites who wished to study at Rome went to the Collegio Urbano. In 1893 Maronite Patriarch John XII obtained the restoration of the college from Leo XIII. The Holy See gave part of the funds, the remainder was collected in France, and in 1894 the new college was inaugurated. In 1904 it acquired its own residence, and came under the charge of Maronite secular priests.

==== Collegio Messicano ====
The Mexican College in Rome was founded by the Mexican Conference of Bishops to allow Mexican priests sponsored by their dioceses to live in Rome while studying a specialization at one of the major universities. It was inaugurated on 12 October 1967 by Cardinal Gabriel-Marie Garrone.

==== Collegio Nepomuceno ====
Formerly known as the Pontifio Collegio Boemo, the Czech College in Rome (Pontificio Collegio Nepomuceno) was established in 1884 for seminarians from what is now the Czech Republic partly with the revenues of the ancient Bohemian hospice founded by Emperor Charles IV, and with contributions of Leo XIII and the Bohemian bishops. The site was transferred several times, but in 1888 the old monastery of S. Francesca Romana in the Via Sistina was purchased. The rector is always one of the professors in the Propaganda, which the students attend. They number from 24 to 28.

==== Collegio Canadese ====
The Canadian Pontifical College (Pontificio Collegio Canadese), a residence for Canadian and Sulpician priests who come to pursue graduate studies in various universities in Rome. It was founded by Cardinal Howard in 1888. In 1974, due to a reduction of the number of candidates for the studies the college relocated to the St. John Nepomucen Pontifical College on the Via Concordia. With the backing of Frédéric-Louis Colin, the Canadian Congregation of St. Sulpice undertook to defray the expenses. On May 6, 1932, a decree of the Roman Congregation for Seminaries and Universities officially recognizes the college as a pontifical institution. As of 2016 the college hosts about twenty student priests who study in numerous institutions, such as the Gregorian University, the Pontifical Biblical Institute, and the Lateran University. From July to late September, the house is closed. From October to June, the college usually has rooms to accommodate guests. The Sulpicians are in charge of the college.

==== Collegio Polacco ====
The Polish College in Rome (Pontificio Collegio Polacco) welcomes seminarians from Poland. In 1583, Philip Neri, and in about 1600, King John Casimir of Poland had begun the foundation of a college for Poles, but their institute was short-lived. In 1866 a college was finally opened due to the efforts of the Congregation of the Resurrection, which raised the first funds to which Princess Odelscalchi, Pius IX, and others contributed later. In 1878 the college was transferred to its present location, the former Maronite College, and the adjoining church was dedicated to St. John Cantius. The students, some of whom pay a small pension, number 30 and are distinguished by their green sashes; they attend the lectures in the Gregorian. The college is under the care of the Resurrectionists and possesses a villa at Albano.

==== Collegio Portoghese ====
The Pontifical Portuguese College in Rome (Pontificio Collegio Portoghese) was founded 1901 for Portuguese-speaking seminarians from Portugal and Brazil. The current rector is José Manuel Garcia Cordeiro, who is a Consultor to the Congregation for Divine Worship and the Discipline of the Sacraments and a professor at the Pontifical Liturgical Institute at Rome's Sant’Anselmo.

==== Collegio Russo ====
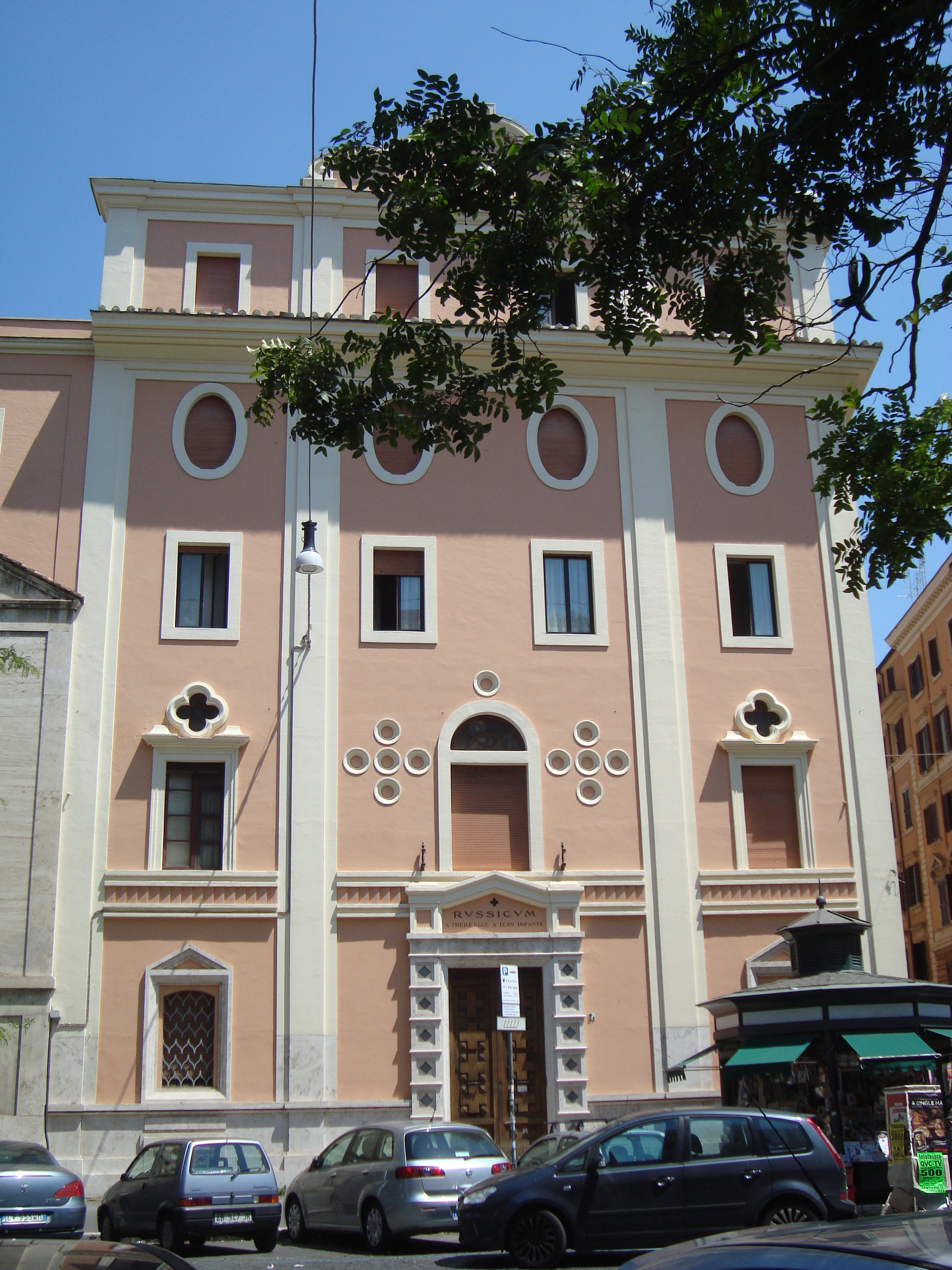
Entrance of the Russicum in Rome.

The Russian College in Rome known as Russicum, (officially: Pontificio Collegio Russo di Santa Teresa del Bambin Gesù) was founded for seminarians who were expected to work in Russia and for seminarians of the Slav-Byzantine church.

==== Collegio Scozzese ====
The Scottish College in Rome (Pontificio Collegio Scozzese) was established in 1600 by Clement VIII for the education of Scottish priests for the preservation of Catholicism in Scotland. It was assigned the revenues of the old Scots hospice, which were increased by the munificence of the pope and other benefactors. In 1604 the college was transferred to the via Quattro Fontane and in 1649 the Countess of Huntly constructed a church dedicated to Saint Andrew and Saint Margaret, Queen of Scotland. From 1615 until 1773 it was under the direction of the Jesuits. The students, numbering about 20, are supported partly by the revenues of the college and partly by the Scottish bishops and by their own money. They attend the Gregorian University and have a villa at Marino. Since 1964, the Scottish College building has been situated on the Via Cassia leaving the former site of Via Quattro Fontane for a purpose-built building on the outskirts of the city.

==== Collegio Spagnuolo ====
The Spanish College in Rome (Pontificio Collegio Spagnuolo de San José) was founded in 1892 through the initiative of Leo XIII, the generosity of the episcopacy, and the royal family for seminarians from Spain. Installed at first in the national hospice of S. Maria in Monserrato, it was transferred later to the Palazzo Altemps near S. Apollinare. The students numbering 70 are for the most part supported by their bishops; they attend the Gregorian. The direction is entrusted to the Spanish Congregation of the Operarii Diocesani.

==== Collegio Americano del Nord ====
The Pontifical North American College (Pontificio Collegio Americano del Nord) was founded in 1859 by Pope Pius IX in a former Dominican and Visitation Convent, the Casa Santa Maria, located in the historic center of Rome near the Trevi Fountain. It was granted pontifical status by the Holy See in 1884. After World War II, the Seminary Division of college was moved to a new campus on the Janiculum Hill overlooking Vatican City. The Casa Santa Maria now serves as a residence for priests pursuing advanced theological degrees. Also located on the Janiculum Hill campus, the Casa O'Toole is home to the Institute for Continuing Theological Education, the college's sabbatical and continuing priestly formation program. Enrollment in the college is available to properly qualified seminarians and priests who are United States citizens, although citizens of other countries can be admitted with the permission of the college's Board of Governors. All students are nominated for enrollment by their own diocesan bishop. At present, the Seminary Division enrollment (including some students who are already ordained priests but who are not engaged in independent graduate studies, and other students who are pursuing a year-long pre-ordination pastoral service program in their home dioceses) numbers over 250; and they come from approximately half of the approximately 200 dioceses of the United States, as well as from a number of dioceses in Australia.

==== Collegio Ucraino ====
The Ukrainian College of Saint Josaphat in Rome (Collegio di San Giosafat Ucraino) was created for seminarians from Ukraine.

The Ukrainian College of the Protection of our Lady in Rome (Collegio di Patrocinio Ucraino) was created for seminarians from Ukraine. Currently, it is closed. All Ukrainian students were transferred to the Ukrainian Pontifical College of Saint Josaphat. The building was given to the Indian Malabar Eastern Catholic Church a few years ago.

==== Collegio Damasceno ====
The Istituto di San Giovanni Damasceno was founded for the priests of the Syro-Malabar and Syro-Malankara Catholic Churches, two of the Oriental Catholic Churches tracing their origins to the apostolic activity of St. Thomas the Apostle in Kerala, India.

The project of the Oriental Congregation to have a "Collegio" under the patronage of St. John Damascene for the Oriental priests as well as for the Latin priests working in the Oriental Churches was presented to Pope Pius XII on 2 October 1940 during the audience granted to Cardinal Eugène Tisserant, the then Secretary of the Congregation for the Oriental Churches. The project was definitively approved by the same Pontiff on 9 November, and was inaugurated on 4 December of the same year, the feast day of St. John Damascene according the Byzantine Calendar.

Since there was no proper residence for the College at that time, it was begun in one of the wings of the Russian College. Among its alumni, there were not only Orientals, but also Latin priests from different countries of Europe and even from Africa, Japan and China. In the first year of its existence there was not even one from India. In the second year, the only Indian was Ettumanookaran Joseph. But slowly the presence of St. Thomas Christians began to increase.

In 1949 the College was shifted to the Pontifical Romanian College on the Janiculum, when the latter became vacant as a result of the Communist invasion of Romania. The Damascene College continued in this residence for 44 years. In the meantime the members from Syro-Malabar and Syro-Malankara Churches became the majority. In the beginning of 1990s, when Eastern Europe became free from Communist regime, students from Romania began to come to Rome again for studies. Therefore, the Oriental Congregation had to find a new residence for Damascene College. That was the period when Cardinal Lourdusamy was the Prefect of the Oriental Congregation. He felt the need of having a building proper to Damascene College. His desire was realized on 27 April 1993 when the College was inaugurated by the then Prefect of the Congregation Cardinal Achille Silvestrini in the new residence at Via Carlo Emanuele I, a former clinic purchased by the Oriental Congregation and completely renovated.

The existence of the College in this place too did not last long. Taking into account the increase in the number of priests coming to Rome for higher studies, the Oriental Congregation decided to shift the College to the former Ukraine College in Via Boccea. It is providential that this transfer to the new place comes on the 75th anniversary of the College. On Sunday, 11 October 2015, Cardinal Leonardo Sandri, the Prefect of the Congregation for the Oriental Churches, celebrated Holy Eucharist in the College Chapel commemorating the Jubilee and inaugurating the academic life of the College in its fourth station.

The list of students (until the year 2015) kept in the file of the College reveals that 855 priests have resided in this Institute during their higher studies in Rome. From the academic year 1996–1997, the Damascene College is reserved to the priests from the two Oriental Catholic Churches from India. On an average, around 50-60 students pursue their Licentiate and Doctoral studies at the College every year.

The administration of the College, which was given to the Jesuits from 1940 to 1974, is entrusted to the Discalced Carmelites from 1974 onwards. There are also two Sisters from Colombia, from the Congregation of Hermanas Domenicas de Betania, at the service of the College.

==== Lithuanian Pontifical College of St. Casimir ====
Lithuanian Pontifical College of St. Casimir was established in 1945 for Lithuanian priests studying in Rome.

==== Pontifical Korean College ====
The rector of the Pontifical Korean College is John Kim Jong-su, of the Archdiocese of Seoul.

=== Other colleges ===
==== Nobile Collegio Cerasoli ====
The Nobile Collegio Cerasoli first began in Rome in 1640, with a bequest of Don Flaminio Cerasoli to the Archconfraternity of Bergamo in Rome to open a college for the training of young clerics from Bergamo. His heirs contested, and the matter was tied up in litigation for a long time. The college was designed by architect Gabriele Valvassori, and opened in 1834. The property was seized by Napoleon, and in 1834 annexed to the "Roman College". The revenues of the legacy continued to support as many students as possible from Bergamo at the college. In 1901 Angelo Roncalli was awarded one of four seats reserved for the Collegio Cerasoli at the "Roman Seminary".

==== Collegio Sant'Anselmo ====
The College of Sant'Anselmo was founded in 1887 by Pope Leo XIII to serve the needs of Benedictines from around the world. Situated on the Aventine Hill, it is one of four Benedictine institutions that occupy the complex known as "Sant'Anselmo all'Aventino" which serves as the Primatial Abbey (Italian: Badia Sant'Anselmo) of the Benedictine Confederation. It serves as both a house of formation for Benedictines, but also as a residence for over one hundred monks from around forty countries, religious, diocesan priests, and lay people. A separate pontifical university is also operated by the Benedictines at the same location, known as the Pontifical Athenaeum of Saint Anselm (Italian: Pontificio Ateneo Sant'Anselmo; Latin: Pontificium Athenaeum Anselmianum).

==== The Lay Centre at Foyer Unitas ====
The Lay Centre at Foyer Unitas is a college and house of formation for the lay vocation and laity pursuing an ecclesial vocation through study and research at the Pontifical Universities in Rome. The centre is dedicated to ecumenical and interreligious hospitality as part of its mission in forming Catholic laity and lay ecclesial ministers.

==== Collegio Apostolico Leoniano ====
The Collegio Apostolico Leoniano owes its origin to P. Valentini, a Lazarist, who, aided by a pious lady, received in a private house the students who could not otherwise gain admittance to the other colleges. The college opened in 1901, and was taken over later by the Holy See and a large building was erected in the Prati di Castello. The college houses the Rome Provincial Office of the Congregation of the Mission and is now located on the Via Pompeo Magno.

=== Former colleges ===
==== Vatican Seminary ====
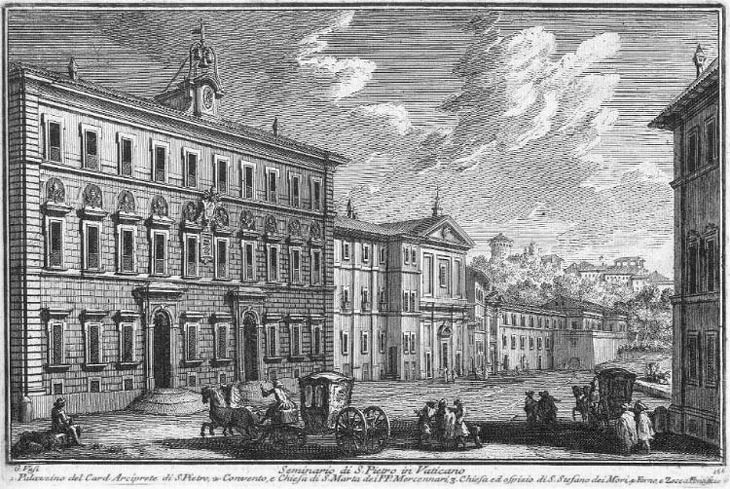
Vatican Seminary and the Church of Santa Matra, Giuseppe Vasi

The Vatican Seminary was founded in 1636 by Urban VIII. Its pupils had the task of assisting at the liturgical services at the Basilica of St. Peter. The administration was entrusted to the Vatican Chapter which appointed the rector. In 1730 the seminary was transferred from the Piazza Rusticucci to a building behind the apse of St. Peter's. In 1913 it was merged with the minor division of the "Roman Seminary" to form the Pontificio Seminario Romano Minore.

==== Pontificio Seminario Pio ====
The Pontificio Seminario Pio or Pius Seminary, was situated in the Palazzo di S. Apollinare, and was intended for seminarians from all regions of Italy. It was founded in 1853 by Pius IX for the dioceses of the Pontifical States. In 1913, it was merged with the major division of the "Roman Seminary" to form the Pontificio Seminario Romano Maggior, located at the Lateran.

==== Seminario dei SS. Pietro e Paolo ====
The Seminario dei SS. Pietro e Paolo was established in 1867 by Pietro Avanzani, a secular priest, to prepare young secular priests for the foreign missions. Pius IX approved it in 1874 and had a college erected, but this was later pulled down and since then the seminary changed its location several times until being housed at the Armenian College. The students have lectures on foreign languages, including Chinese. The college has a country residence at Montopoli in the Sabine hills. On finishing their studies the students go to the Vicariate Apostolic of Southern Shen-si or to Lower California. It existed until 1926 at which date it merged with the Pontifical Institute for Foreign Missions

== See also ==
- Pontifical university

== Bibliography ==
- L'organisation et administration centrale de l'eglise (Paris, 1900), 600 sqq.
- DANIEL; BAUMGARTEN; DE WAAL, Rome, Le chef supreme;
- Moroni, Dizionario, XIII (Venice, 1842), LXIV (ibid., 1853).
