= Joseph-Vincent Quiblier =

French priest (1796–1852)

Joseph-Vincent Quiblier (26 June 1796 – 12 September 1852) was a Roman Catholic priest involved in Sulpician educational endeavors in Canada.

Born in France, Quiblier moved to Montreal in 1825 with Joseph-Alexandre Baile and almost immediately became involved as a Sulpician educator at the Petit Séminaire de Montréal. Although he was young and poorly trained, there was a great need to fill teaching positions at the seminary. By 1828, he was the director there and seems to have had the confidence of the French Canadian Sulpicians. However, this group appears to have been in conflict with the rest of Catholic community including Archbishop Bernard-Claude Panet.

Quiblier became the superior of the Séminaire de Saint-Sulpice in Montreal in 1831. He retained this position until 1846 when he resigned under some pressure and was replaced. The new superior was Pierre-Louis Billaudèle who was the director of the first Grand Séminaire de Montréal.
