= Carriera =

Carriera is a surname. Notable people with the surname include:

- Amalia Isabel Rodríguez Carriera (1924 – 2021), Cuban-Mexican dancer, actress and comedian;
- Rosalba Carriera (1673 – 1757), Venetian Rococo painter;
- Rosalba Carriera Peale (1799 – 1874), American portraitist, landscape painter, and lithographer.

== See also ==
- Carrera (surname)
