= Frédéric-Louis Colin =

French-Canadian Sulpician priest

Frédéric-Louis Colin (1835 in Bourges, France – 27 November 1902 in Montreal) was a French-Canadian Sulpician priest. Much involved in higher education, he was also superior in Canada of his order from 1881 to his death.

== Life ==
After pursuing a course of scientific studies, he entered the Seminary of Saint-Sulpice at Paris, where he was ordained priest in 1859. Transferred to Canada in 1862, he at first took up parochial work; later he became successively professor of theology and director of the higher seminary at Montreal.

For twenty years Colin was the promoter in Montreal of higher education for the clergy and laity. For the clergy he founded the Canadian College at Rome (1885), intended to enable young Canadian priests to pursue a higher course of ecclesiastical studies by attending the Roman universities; besides this he established the seminary of philosophy at Montreal (1892).

Colin established Laval University, despite many obstacles. With Ferdinand Brunetière he advocated the erection of a chair of French literature to be occupied by a lecturer from France, and he himself defrayed the costs. This was an early example of the way French and Belgian specialists have been brought into French-Canadian higher education.

== Works ==
Many of his sermons were printed; among them are one to the papal zouaves returning from Rome (1871), and a funeral oration on Ignace Bourget (1885).
