= Henri de Bernières =

Henri de Bernières (c. 1635 – 1700) was a French Catholic priest who served as the first resident pastor of Quebec in France's American colony of New France. He also served as the first superior of the Séminaire de Québec.

== Early life ==
Bernières was born in Caen, Normandy, the son of Pierre de Bernières, Baron of Acqueville, and of Madeleine Le Breton. He was destined by his parents for service in the Church and received the tonsure at the age of nine, when he was entrusted into the care of his uncle, Jean de Bernières de Louvigny, who then raised him in a religious community which he had founded in 1644 in the same city, though he was a layman. His work was a part of the reform movement of the Catholic Church sparked by the Council of Trent, and the hermitage was a major influence in that movement, in association with the Compagnie du Saint-Sacrement. A young priest, François de Laval spent several years in retreat at the community, coming to know the young Henri during that time.

In 1659, Laval, by then a member of the Paris Foreign Missions Society, had been appointed by King Louis XIV to serve as the first Bishop of Quebec in the colony of New France. Upon the recommendation of his uncle, though still only in minor orders, Bernières was chosen as one of a group of clerics to accompany the new bishop to America.

== New France ==
Laval and his companions sailed from La Rochelle on 13 April 1659, together with the Jesuit Jérôme Lalemant. They arrived in Fort Ville-Marie two months later, on 16 June, only to find that no residence had been provided for them, but they found temporary quarters. Bernières was appointed Laval's chaplain and continued his theological studies until he was ordained as a priest on 13 March 1660.

Laval soon entrusted Bernières with the pastoral care of the district of Quebec. The young priest also supervised the building of a residence for the bishop and clergy, completed in 1662. That same year Laval returned to France to deal with a number of issues plaguing the colony, leaving Bernières one of two Vicars General in charge of the mission. When the bishop returned to the colony the following year, he brought with him a royal charter for the establishment of a seminary. Further, he established a canonical parish, the first in New France, and was appointed as its first pastor.

== Seminary of Quebec ==
By 1665 the seminary appeared to be reliably enough established, and Laval selected Bernières for this office. He was to hold it for four terms: 1665–72, 1673–83, 1685–88 and 1693–98, a total of 25 years. The seminary began to develop in stages: first as a school of theology (1663), then it became a classical college (1668), after which it grew into a seigneurial corporation (1668), then a large corporation, supporting the clergy of the colony. As a frontier mission, sources of funding needed to be secured. The priests engaged in the ministry looked to the seminary for support, the seminary, in turn, relied upon the Séminaire des Missions Étrangères in Paris, by virtue of an agreement made by Laval with his religious congregation in 1665, as well as upon donations from monasteries and individuals back in France who wished to support the Catholic Church's mission to the native peoples.

Bernières died in Quebec in 1700.
