= François Vachon de Belmont =

Fifth superior of the Montreal Sulpicians from 1700 to 1731

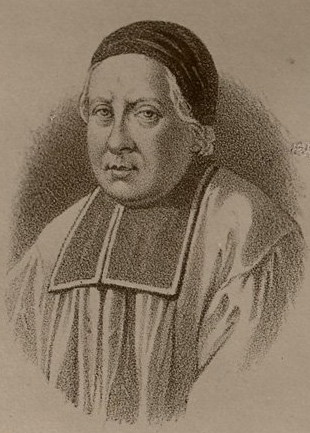
- Born: 3 April 1645; Dauphiné, France
- Died: 22 May 1732 (aged 87); Montreal, Canada, New France

François Vachon de Belmont (3 April 1645 – 22 May 1732) was the fifth superior of the Montreal Sulpicians from 1700 to 1731. Vachon de Belmont was born in Burgundy, France to a wealthy family. He moved to Canada and personally funded the construction of La Montagne mission near Montreal.

He authored a manuscript history of New France entitled Recueil de pièces sur l’histoire du Canada, which is currently held at the Bibliothèque nationale de France and known as Français 13516. This manuscript was partially published under the title Histoire du Canada, by the Quebec Literary and Historical Society Collections in 1840.
