= Joseph-Alexandre Baile =

Canadian educator

- Born: 19 April 1801; Saint-Genest-de-Beauzon
- Died: 31 July 1888; Montreal, Canada
- Occupation(s): priest, professor

Joseph-Alexandre Baile (19 April 1801 – 31 July 1888) was a Sulpician priest and administrator of seminaries in Montreal. Baile was often in conflict with Joseph-Vincent Quiblier, the superior of the Sulpicians in Canada. He also opposed splitting the Notre-Dame parish of Montreal, and verbally fought with Ignace Bourget about that issue to such an extent that Catholic officials in Rome ended up having to settle the matter themselves by decree. Baile was also a spiritual guide for the Grey Nuns, and helped establish a new seminary in the town of Oka. He retired in 1881 and died in Montreal.

== Early life ==
Baile was born on 19 April 1801 in Saint-Genest-de-Beauzon, France. He studied with the Basilians, then entered a Sulpician novitiate in 1823. Two years later, he was sent to Canada and ordained a priest in October 1826.

== Teaching career ==
In 1827, Baile became a professor at Petit Séminaire de Montréal, teaching in the rhetoric section of the classics. From 1830 to 1846, he was the director of the seminary. His tenure was affected by a negative reputation towards the school by both clergy and lay people. Montreal reformers accused the college of supporting unquestioning loyalty to authorities; in 1830, amid heightened tensions from the 1830 Lower Canada election, several students occupied the seminary for three days and hung posters comparing Baile to Charles X. Baile defended the teachers and criticised the leader of the Sulpicians in Canada, Joseph-Vincent Quiblier, for being too timid. Baile communicated to the Sulpician superior general Paris that Quiblier would make decisions about the college without consulting Baile and that Quiblier refused to expel any students because he did not want a declining enrollment in the school. Baile's tenure saw a decline of 50% in registrations at the seminary, due to a bias against French-Canadian culture among the Sulpicians that ran the school and Baile's authoritative administration style.

Baile went to France in 1846 to report to the superior general of the Sulpicians about the situation in Montreal. He returned to Canada the following year and became director of the Grand Séminaire de Montréal, where he remained for 20 years. He focused on increasing the theological education of the students, commenting on how many came from impoverished backgrounds and treated the seminary as temporary employment before they were hired by a college. Baile resisted pressure from Bishop Ignace Bourget to have the theology training focus more extensively on the prerogatives and powers of the Pope. He also complained in 1848 that Bourget wanted more control over the governance of the seminary.

In 1863, a dispute started over the question of dividing the Notre-Dame parish. Baile supported the community consensus against the separation and was worried that Bourget wanted to dismantle the Saint-Sulpice Seminary. In 1865, the decree of the Sacred Congregation stipulated that Bourget could create as many parishes as he wished, but that the seminary did not have to send priests and other religious officials to serve in the churches. Bourget's erection of churches without secular help caused the parish to have one parochial church council which, in his role as superior of the Sulpicians, was to be chaired by Baile. To prevent Baile's influence in the council, Bourget ordered that Benjamin-Victor Rousselot, the acting pastor, be appointed as chair instead. In 1866, Baile became the superior of the Sulpicians in Canada and argued against Bourget's reforms. In Rome the following year, he continued to argue against the separation, declaring it against civil law. After negotiations between the competing sides and three pontifical decrees, the matter was settled with the Saint-Sulpice Seminary relinquishing responsibility for several outlying parishes that Bourget established in 1867.

In 1868, Baile defended the Irish community in Montreal's opposition to separating Notre-Dame parish, as it was planned that the predominantly-Irish St. Patrick church would be merged with a French-speaking majority church. Baile stated that the merger would cause the Irish to attend churches with a majority of French-Canadian parishioners, which would cause conflicts and physical altercations between the groups.

== Later life and death ==
In 1866 Baile was appointed as the spiritual guide for the Grey Nuns; when his tenure ended, he expressed disappointment in the nuns and said he treated the nuns as a father should treat his children. He also led ecclesiastical retreats and presided at the opening of the faculty of theology at Université Laval à Montréal. He also established a Trappist monastery in Oka, Quebec, despite hostility for their mission from Protestant missionaries and the Iroquois. The Canadian government was planning to send the Iroquois to Ontario and in 1875 Baile offered $20,000 to the government to expel the Iroquois from the area. When Édouard-Charles Fabre was appointed as bishop of the parish, Baile kept a distant relationship with the bishop, and was annoyed at Fabre's requests for funds. Baile retired in 1881 and died on 31 July 1888 in Montreal.
