= Gabriel Thubières de Levy de Queylus =

French priest (1612-1677)

Gabriel Thubières de Levy de Queylus, S.S. (1612 – 20 May 1677), was a Sulpician priest from France, who was a leader in the development of New France. He was the founder and first superior of the Seminary of Saint-Sulpice in Montreal.

== Life ==
=== Early life ===
De Queylus, as he was known during his life, was born in 1612 in Privezac, in the ancient Province of Rouergue in the Kingdom of France, a son of a wealthy nobleman. Destined for service in the Church, at the age of 11 he was made the commendatory abbot of the Abbey of Loc-Dieu, giving him the lifelong title of abbé. Choosing late in his life to pursue the priesthood, he studied at a seminary in the village of Vaugirard, now the Quartier Saint-Lambert in the 15th arrondissement of Paris. He was ordained a priest on 15 April 1645. In July of that year, he joined the Society of Saint-Sulpice, dedicated to the sound training of a clergy for France and her territories. That same year, independently, he joined the Société Notre-Dame de Montréal, an organization dedicated to the conversion of the people of the First Nations in the recently conquered territory of New France.

Almost immediately after his admission to the Society, de Queylus gained the trust of its founder, Jean-Jacques Olier, whom he might have known from their mutual alma mater. Olier soon entrusted him with the task of establishing new seminaries in the format which he had instituted in 1641 in founding the Seminary of Saint-Sulpice, Paris. Within a few years, de Queylus had established seminaries in his native region of Rodez (1647), as well as in Nantes (1649) and Viviers (1650). In 1648, moreover, he was briefly made superior of the motherhouse of Saint-Sulpice in Paris. Two years later, de Queylus settled in the Vivarais, as the pastor of Privas, site of the final rebellion of the Huguenots in France. He worked to convert the remaining Huguenot population to the Catholic faith. He also established a Sulpician seminary at Clermont in 1656. Shortly after that, he was recalled to Paris.

=== New France ===
==== First mission ====
In 1656, the Societé de Montréal determined to establish a seminary in the colony of Ville-Marie, now Montreal, for the training of missionaries to the indigenous people of America. Olier, himself a member of the society, nominated de Queylus, his trusted assistant who had already successfully founded four such schools. Given de Queylus' large fortune and his characteristic generosity, it seemed even more of a natural choice for an enterprise which would require all the resources that could be found. Some members of the society further proposed that the candidate should be a bishop. Queylus gave his consent to both proposals. His nomination was declared at the General Assembly of the French clergy held on 10 January 1657.

The Jesuits, who at that point had complete control of the colony, objected and put forth an alternate candidate, François de Laval, who enjoyed the favor of the royal court. This rankled de Queylus for much of his time in New France, but he accepted the decision of the society. For the mission, Olier also appointed two other priests, Dominique Galinier and Gabriel Souart, and a deacon, Antoine d’Allet. All four set sail on 17 May 1657 from Saint-Nazaire in Brittany, after receiving ecclesiastical authority by letters dated 22 April, from François de Harlay de Champvallon, Archbishop of Rouen, who claimed authority over the operations of the Catholic Church in the colony. The archbishop had also given letters patent to de Queylus, naming him as his vicar general for the whole of New France. He did not tell de Queylus that his predecessor in Rouen had given that same authority to the Superior of the Jesuit missions in Canada in 1649.

De Queylus and his colleagues arrived at Île d’Orléans in late July of that year, where they were hosted in Rivière-des-Roches (now the Les Rivières Quarter of Quebec) at the house of René Maheut. As soon as he heard of the clerics' arrival, Jean de Quen, the Superior of the Jesuits, hastened to welcome them and brought them to Quebec. Their first meeting was polite and cordial. A few days later, de Queylus showed de Quen his letters of appointment. They agreed that the Jesuit would take no action in his capacity as vicar general, since the Archbishop of Rouen had left his status unclear. After confirming Joseph-Antoine Poncet, the Jesuit pastor of Quebec, in his appointment, the Sulpicians sailed for Montreal.

The Sulpicians had given Poncet a papal bull of indulgence granted by Pope Alexander VII on the occasion of his election to the papacy, with instructions to proclaim it from the pulpit. Without notifying his superior, Poncet read the papal document to his congregation. Quen interpreted this as a show of independence, and – as he was entitled to do by reason of his formal agreement with de Queylus – relieved Poncet as pastor and replaced him with Father Claude Pijart. Poncet, on his way to the Iroquois country, stopped at Ville-Marie at the beginning of September and informed de Queylus of this incident. De Queylus, taking offense in his turn, ordered Poncet to accompany him to Quebec. When they arrived there on 12 September, de Queylus immediately took control of the parish from Pijart and declared himself pastor. A battle of names ensued between de Queylus and de Quen.

De Queylus then took the Jesuits to court in an effort to claim their residence as parish property, but the Jesuits proved that they had purchased it. By the summer of 1658, a visitor reported that the religious leaders of the colony were in harmony. That July, documents from the Archbishop of Rouen confirmed de Queylus as vicar general in Montreal and Poncet as vicar general for the rest of the colony. While de Queylus initially balked, but soon relented and moved to Montreal.

During this period, de Queylus worked on building up the colony. In 1657 he reorganized the parish of Montreal and appointed his fellow Sulpician, Gabriel Souart, as its pastor. In 1658 he authorized the building of the Churches of Sainte-Anne at Beaupré and of Notre-Dame-de-la-Visitation at Château-Richer. In 1659 he supervised the development of the settlement of Ville-Marie, fixing the site of the town and making it ready for the arrival of new settlers, who were to clear the fiefs of Saint-Marie and of Saint-Gabriel.

De Queylus had envisioned the founding of a hospital at Ville-Marie for aged and sick Indians. He hoped that the natives, following their relatives who were being cared for there, would come to Montreal, settle there, and gradually acquire the French language and manners from their contacts with the settlers. Admiring the work of the Canonesses of St. Augustine of the Mercy of Jesus at Hôtel-Dieu de Québec, in 1658 he had offered them the administration of a hospital which was being operated by Jeanne Mance, a laywoman who had helped to found the colony, pending the arrival of canonesses from another religious Order in France. De Queylus obtained Laval's permission for the direction of this institution to be entrusted to the canonesses of Quebec. The administrator of the hospital, however, found another benefactor and was able to bring three Religious Hospitallers of St. Joseph from the Hôtel-Dieu of La Fleche in France.

De Queylus' position was eroded, moreover, with the hurried appointment of François de Laval as apostolic vicar for the colony by the Holy See, which rejected the protests of the Parlements of both Rouen and Paris. Laval landed in Quebec on 16 June 1659. While initially confused as to his authority relative to that of de Queylus, the colonists soon accepted him as their spiritual leader. De Queylus acknowledged him as apostolic vicar the following August.

This changed when new letters giving de Queyluy ecclesiastical authority over the colony were received from both the Archbishop of Rouen and King Louis XIV the following month. Recanting his earlier submission, de Queylus sought to have the governor of the colony enforce his authority. Unfortunately for him, the king had quickly reversed his decision. When a letter to that effect arrived, de Queylus relented. He then sailed back to France on 22 October 1659.

==== Second mission ====
After his return, de Queylus immediately began to form plans to return to New France. Laval, suspecting him of this, had already requested that the king take steps to prevent his return. In February 1660, King Louis explicitly forbade de Queylus from leaving France without his express permission. When de Queylus was unsuccessful in getting the king to reverse his decision, he covertly left for Rome, where he tricked the Apostolic Datary into giving him a papal bull which established a parish in Ville-Marie independent of the Vicar Apostolic's authority. It further gave the right of nomination of the pastor for said parish to the Superior General of the Sulpicians, and the right of appointment to the Archbishop of Rouen. Once he had received this appointment by the archbishop he sailed to New France under an alias. Disembarking at Percé, he then took a small boat which arrived in Quebec before the ship from Europe had arrived, landing there on 3 August 1661.

Laval was completely astonished at de Queylus' arrival and claims of authority. He refused to recognize the papal bull and threatened de Queylus with suspension of his priestly faculties if he were to proceed with his plans to go to Montreal. Completely ignoring the threats of sanctions, de Queylus took a canoe and arrived in Ville-Marie on 6 August. When King Louis heard of this, he ordered Pierre Dubois Davaugour, the newly appointed Governor of New France to have him sent back upon his arrival in the colony. De Queylus boarded a boat bound for France on 22 October 1661, which ended the struggle between himself and de Laval. It further led the Archbishop of Rouen to drop his claims of authority over the colony.

==== Third mission ====
De Queylus' forced return to France was a major setback for the waning Societé de Montréal. He had been a major financial supporter of their undertakings. In March 1663 they ceded ownership of Montreal Island to the Sulpicians. Though they were now the Seigneurs of the colony, without de Queylus' guidance and financial support, they questioned the viability of the project of a seminary there. During a visit to France, de Laval was asked to allow his return. This he steadfastly refused to do.

By 1668, however, de Queylus' quiet submission in the matter changed de Laval's mind and he allowed him to return to New France as the Superior of the Seminary of Ville-Marie. Laval even appointed him Vicar General for the island. Upon his return in the autumn of that year, de Queylus embarked on an ambitious program of missionary activity by the Sulpicians of the colony. He sent two priests to establish a mission among the Onondagas on Lake Ontario, aided the following year by François-Saturnin Lascaris d'Urfé. By 1670 there were three separate missions on the shores of the lake. At the same time, he sent two Sulpicians to evangelize the Odawa people in the Mississippi Valley. They traveled as far as Lake Erie, which they claimed in the name of France.

De Queylus also took up the challenge of the cultural conversion of the native children, having both boys and girls educated in French and useful trades by the Sulpicians and the early members of the Congregation of Notre Dame. These attempts proved ineffective. Additionally, he also attempted to fulfill his earlier promises to the canonesses of Quebec for funding a medical mission to the Native Americans. In 1671, in order to persuade them to assume this undertaking, he promised them a generous grant of land and a fund of 10,000 French livres. This project never reached completion. His offer of land grants to colonists who would come to serve for a time as indentured servants nearly tripled the population of Ville-Marie between 1666-71.

=== Final days ===
By 1671 de Queylus' accomplishments had won the praise of the king and others. That year he returned to France for the division of his father's estate among himself and his brothers. While there, he took seriously ill and retired to the motherhouse in Paris, where he died on 20 May 1677.
