= Carrero =

Carrero may refer to:

- Aimee Carrero (born 1988), Dominican actress
- Beto Carrero (1937–2008), Brazilian theme park owner and entertainer
- Daniel Gómez Carrero (born 1990), Spanish singer, known professionally as Kaydy Cain
- Hilda Carrero (1951–2002), Venezuelan beauty queen
- Leonardo Carrero (born 1992), Venezuelan model and male beauty pageant titleholder
- Lenore Carrero Nesbitt (1932–2001), American lawyer and judge.
- Luis Carrero Blanco (1904–1973), Spanish military officer and politician
- Mario Carrero (born 1952), Uruguayan musician
- Nelson Carrero (born 1953), Venezuelan football player and manager
- Raimundo Carrero (1947–2026), Brazilian journalist and writer
- Russel Carrero (1950–1990), Nicaraguan athlete
- Tico Carrero (born 1948), Puerto Rican tennis player
- Tônia Carrero (1922–2018), Brazilian actress
- Yaniel Carrero (born 1995), Cuban athlete
