= Montigny-sur-Avre =

- Commune
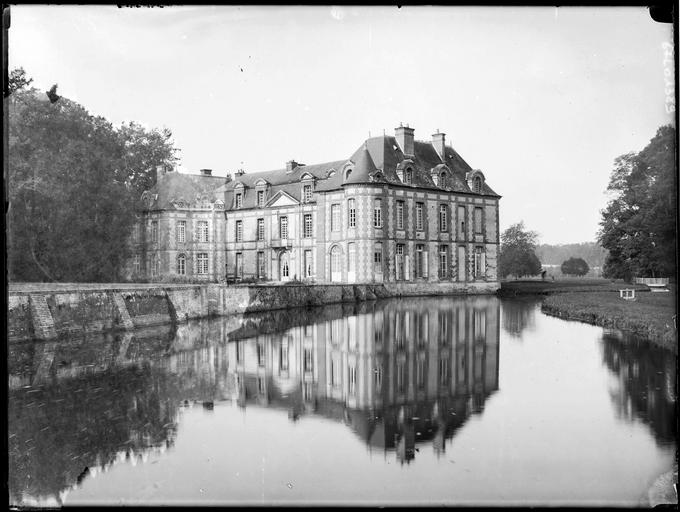
- The chateau in Montigny-sur-Avre
- Location of Montigny-sur-Avre
- Location within France Location within Centre-Val de Loire
- Coordinates: 48°43′49″N 1°01′23″E
- Country: France
- Region: Centre-Val de Loire
- Department: Eure-et-Loir
- Arrondissement: Dreux
- Canton: Saint-Lubin-des-Joncherets

Government
  - Mayor (2020–2026): Richard Boucherie
- Area^{1}: 7.26 km^{2} (2.80 sq mi)
- Highest elevation: 183 m (600 ft)
- Lowest elevation: 135 m (443 ft)
- Population (2023): 256
  - Density: 35.3/km^{2} (91.3/sq mi)
- Time zone: UTC+01:00 (CET)
  - Summer (DST): UTC+02:00 (CEST)
- INSEE/Postal code: 28263 /28270
- ^{1} French Land Register data, which excludes lakes, ponds, glaciers > 1 km^{2} (0.386 sq mi or 247 acres) and river estuaries.

Montigny-sur-Avre (French pronunciation: [mɔ̃tiɲi syʁ avʁ], literally Montigny on Avre) is a commune in the Eure-et-Loir department in northern France.

== Population ==
Historical population
Year	Pop.	±% p.a.
1968	219	—
1975	205	−0.94%
1982	225	+1.34%
1990	276	+2.59%
1999	275	−0.04%
2007	253	−1.04%
2012	258	+0.39%
2017	258	+0.00%
2023	256	−0.13%
Source: INSEE

== See also ==
- Communes of the Eure-et-Loir department
