= Saint-Genest-de-Beauzon =

- Commune
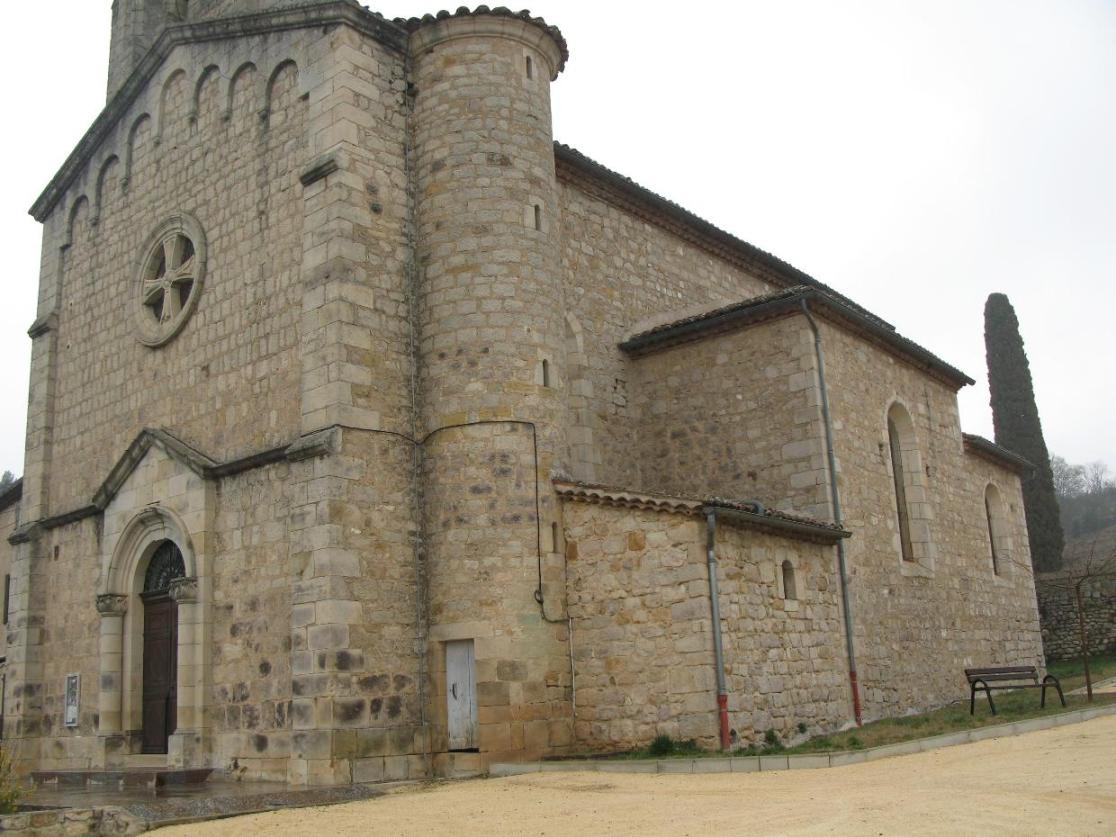
- The church in Saint-Genest-de-Beauzon
- Location of Saint-Genest-de-Beauzon
- Location within France Location within Auvergne-Rhône-Alpes
- Coordinates: 44°26′35″N 4°11′17″E
- Country: France
- Region: Auvergne-Rhône-Alpes
- Department: Ardèche
- Arrondissement: Largentière
- Canton: Les Cévennes ardéchoises

Government
  - Mayor (2020–2026): Nathalie Belva
- Area^{1}: 5.31 km^{2} (2.05 sq mi)
- Elevation: 250 m (820 ft)
- Highest elevation: 356 m (1,168 ft)
- Lowest elevation: 176 m (577 ft)
- Population (2023): 332
  - Density: 62.5/km^{2} (162/sq mi)
- Time zone: UTC+01:00 (CET)
  - Summer (DST): UTC+02:00 (CEST)
- INSEE/Postal code: 07238 /07230
- ^{1} French Land Register data, which excludes lakes, ponds, glaciers > 1 km^{2} (0.386 sq mi or 247 acres) and river estuaries.

Saint-Genest-de-Beauzon (French pronunciation: [sɛ̃ ʒənɛ də bozɔ̃]; Occitan: Sant Genèst de Beuson) is a commune in the Ardèche department in southern France.

== Population ==
Historical population
Year	Pop.	±% p.a.
1968	225	—
1975	191	−2.31%
1982	197	+0.44%
1990	201	+0.25%
1999	222	+1.11%
2007	236	+0.77%
2012	296	+4.63%
2017	318	+1.44%
2023	332	+0.72%
Source: INSEE

== See also ==
- Communes of the Ardèche department
