= Keumhee Carrière Chough =

Korean-Canadian statistician

- Hangul: 조금희
- RR: Jo Geumhui
- MR: Cho Kŭmhŭi

Keumhee Carrière Chough (also published as Keumhee Chough Carrière) is a Korean-Canadian statistician whose theoretical contributions include work on repeated measures design; she is co-editor of Analysis of Mixed Data: Methods & Application, and has also contributed to highly cited works on public health. She is a professor of mathematical and statistical sciences at the University of Alberta.

== Education and career ==
After graduating from Seoul National University in 1979 and earning a master's degree at the University of Manitoba in 1985, Chough went to the University of Wisconsin–Madison for doctoral study, earning a second master's degree in 1987 and completing her Ph.D. in 1989. Her dissertation, Statistical Issues for Repeated Measures Data in the Presence of Treatment Effects, was supervised by Gregory C. Reinsel.

She became an assistant professor and director of the statistical consulting center at the University of Iowa in 1990, moving to the University of Manitoba in 1993 and the University of Alberta in 1996. At the University of Alberta, she has directed the Training Consulting Centre and the Biostatistics Research Group since 1999. She was named full professor in 2000, and became head of the Statistics Division in the Department of Mathematical and Statistical Sciences in 2013.

== Recognition ==
Chough was president of the Biostatistics Section of the Statistical Society of Canada for 2002–2003. She was named a Fellow of the American Statistical Association in 2009.
