= Joseph Carrière =

French Sulpician moral theologian

Joseph Carrière, S.S. (19 February 1795, in Lapanouse-de-Cernon – 23 April 1864, in Lyon) was a French Sulpician moral theologian, and from 1850 the 13th Superior General of the Society of Saint-Sulpice. Carrière was the first writer of note to treat theology in its relations to the Napoleonic Code.

== Life ==
Carrière entered the seminary of Saint-Sulpice in 1812, and five years later, at the age of twenty-two, became a member of the society and was ordained a priest. The following year, he was appointed to teach the postgraduate course of moral theology at this seminary.

In 1829 Carrière came to America in the capacity of official Visitor to the Sulpician houses, and was invited to take part in the First Provincial Council of Baltimore.

Conservative in temperament and by education, Carrière was one of the first to combat the ideas of Félicité de La Mennais.

== Works ==
Carrière's published writings are:

- "Dissertation sur la réhabilitation des marriages nuls" (1828–34);
- "Juris cultor theologus circa obligationes restitutionis", by I. Vogler, S.J., enlarged and adapted to the French Law (1833), and incorporated in Migne's "Theologiae Cursus Completus";
- "Praelectiones theologicae: De Matrimonio" (2 vols., Paris, 1837; Louvain, 1838); a compendium of this work (1837), which has had eight editions;
- "Praelectiones theologicae: De justitia et jure" (3 vols., Paris, 1839; Louvain, 1845), and a compendium (1840) which also reached its eighth edition;
- "Praelectiones theologicae: De Contractibus (3 vols., Paris, 1844–47; Louvain, 1846–48), of which the compendium (1848) has had four editions.

He was inclined to the opinion, generally held in France in his day, that the State had the power to create diriment impediments to marriage among Catholics; but he abandoned it as soon as it was disapproved at Rome.
