= Serge Carrière =

Canadian physiologist

Dr. Serge Carrière, OC is a Canadian physiologist, physician and educator who received the Order of Canada in 1997. He received the award for being a strong leader in the fields of renal physiology and intra-renal circulation, for advancing the field of nephrology, and also for establishing a partnership of universities and industry that created several medicine-related chairs at the Université de Montréal.

He studied, graduating magna cum laude, at the Université de Montréal. He initially became a research fellow at Harvard University, before in 1964 become a professor, the director of the department of medicine, and then the dean at the Université de Montréal. Thereafter he was employed by Servier and Phoenix International Life Services.
