= Carrère =

- Commune
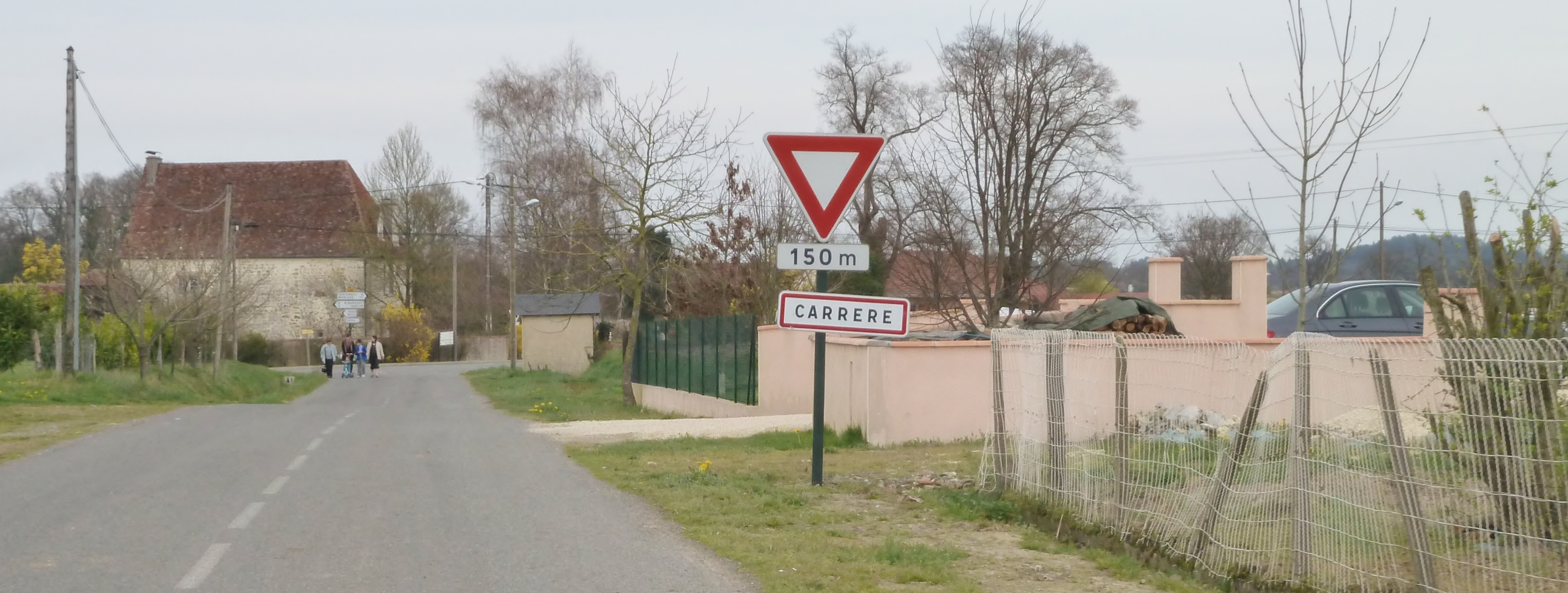
- The road into Carrère
- Location of Carrère
- Location within France Location within Nouvelle-Aquitaine
- Coordinates: 43°29′04″N 0°16′46″W
- Country: France
- Region: Nouvelle-Aquitaine
- Department: Pyrénées-Atlantiques
- Arrondissement: Pau
- Canton: Terres des Luys et Coteaux du Vic-Bilh
- Intercommunality: Luys en Béarn

Government
  - Mayor (2022–2026): Pierre-Michel Esain
- Area^{1}: 6.61 km^{2} (2.55 sq mi)
- Elevation: 246 m (807 ft)
- Highest elevation: 252 m (827 ft)
- Lowest elevation: 164 m (538 ft)
- Population (2023): 221
  - Density: 33.4/km^{2} (86.6/sq mi)
- Time zone: UTC+01:00 (CET)
  - Summer (DST): UTC+02:00 (CEST)
- INSEE/Postal code: 64167 /64160
- ^{1} French Land Register data, which excludes lakes, ponds, glaciers > 1 km^{2} (0.386 sq mi or 247 acres) and river estuaries.

Carrère (French pronunciation: [kaʁɛʁ]; Occitan: Carrèra) is a commune in the Pyrénées-Atlantiques department in south-western France.

== See also ==
- Communes of the Pyrénées-Atlantiques department
