= Society of the Priests of Saint Sulpice =

Roman Catholic society of apostolic life

Society of Priests of Saint-Sulpice
- Compagnie des Prêtres de Saint-Sulpice (French)
- Abbreviation: Post-nominal letters: P.S.S.
- Nickname: Sulpicians
- Formation: 1642; 384 years ago
- Founder: Fr. Jean-Jacques Olier, PSS
- Founded at: Paris, France
- Type: Society of apostolic life of Pontifical Right for men
- Headquarters: General Motherhouse; 6, rue du Regard, 75006 Paris, France
- Members: 243 members (243 priests) as of 2020
- Motto: Latin: Auspice Maria; English: Under the guidance of Mary
- Superior General: Fr. Shayne Craig, PSS
- Ministry: Education of seminarians and priests
- Countries served: France, Canada, and the United States.
- Parent organization: Roman Catholic Church
- Website: www.generalsaintsulpice.org/en/

The Society of Priests of Saint-Sulpice (French: Compagnie des Prêtres de Saint-Sulpice; PSS), also known as the Sulpicians, is a society of apostolic life of pontifical right for men, named after the Church of Saint-Sulpice, Paris, where it was founded. Members add the postnominal letters PSS. Typically, the society's priests become full members only after ordination and some years of pastoral work. The purpose of the society is mainly the education of priests and, to some extent, parish work. Sulpicians place great emphasis on the academic and spiritual formation of their own members, who commit themselves to undergoing lifelong development in these areas. The society is divided into provinces of France, Canada, and the United States, which operate in various countries.

== In France ==
The Society of Priests of Saint Sulpice was founded in France in 1641 by Father Jean-Jacques Olier (1608–1657), an exemplar of the French School of Spirituality. A disciple of Vincent de Paul and Charles de Condren, Olier took part in "missions" organized by them.

The French priesthood at that time suffered from low morale, academic deficits and other problems. Envisioning a new approach to priestly preparation, Olier gathered a few priests and seminarians around him in Vaugirard, a suburb of Paris, in the final months of 1641. Shortly thereafter, he moved his operation to the parish of Saint-Sulpice in Paris, hence the name of the new Society. After several adjustments, he built a seminary next to the current church of Saint-Sulpice. The Séminaire de Saint-Sulpice thereby became the first Sulpician seminary. There the first seminarians got their spiritual formation, while taking most theology courses at the Sorbonne. The spirit of this new seminary and its founder caught the attention of many leaders in the French Church; and before long, members of the new Society staffed a number of new seminaries elsewhere in the country.

Sulpician priests contributed to the parish community during the day, but at night they would return to their institutions. Jean-Jacques Olier attempted to control diverse social groups by having laymen of the community give reports on family life, poverty, and disorder. The Sulpicians were very strict in regards to women and sexuality to the extent that women were eventually banned from the seminary unless it was for short visits in the external area with appropriate attire. The Sulpicians accepted aspirants to the company as long as they were priests and had permission from their bishop. The Sulpicians would thus recruit wealthy individuals since Sulpicians did not take vows of poverty. They retained ownership of individual property and were free to dispose their wealth. The Sulpicians soon came to be known for the revival of the parish life, reform of seminary life, and the revitalization of spirituality.

In the 18th century they attracted the sons of the nobility, as well as candidates from the common class, and produced a large number of the French bishops. The Séminaire de Saint-Sulpice was closed during the French Revolution, and its teachers and students scattered to avoid persecution. That Revolution also led to the secularization of the University of Paris. When France stabilized, theology courses were offered exclusively in seminaries, and the Sulpicians resumed their educational mission. Sulpician seminaries earned and maintained reputations for solid academic teaching and high moral tone. The Society spread from France to Canada, the United States and to several other foreign countries, including eventually to Vietnam and French Africa, where French Sulpician seminaries are found even today.

== In Canada ==
=== New France ===
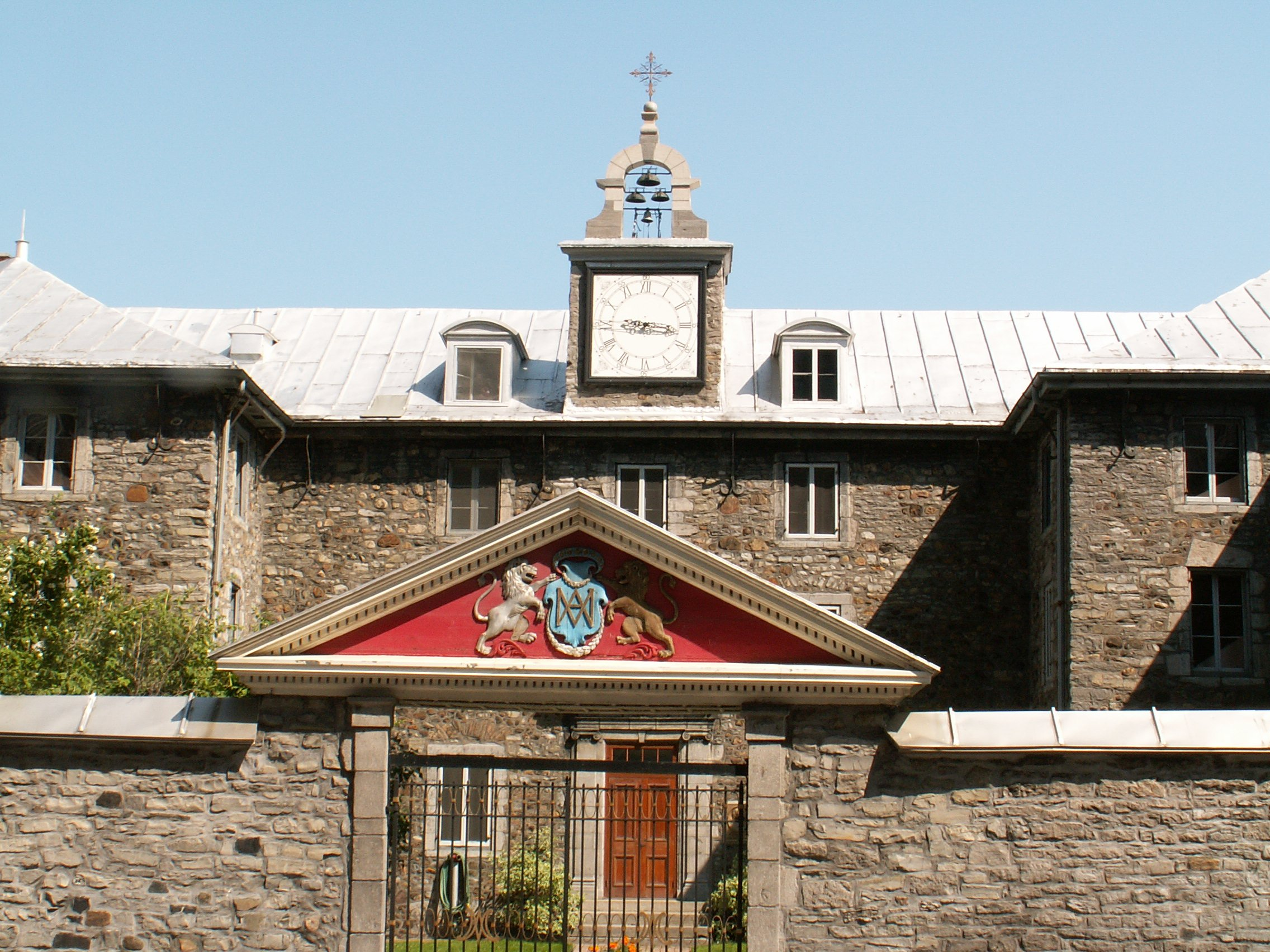
Saint-Sulpice Seminary in Old Montreal

The Sulpicians played a major role in the founding of the Canadian city of Montreal, where they engaged in missionary activities, trained priests and constructed the Saint-Sulpice Seminary.

The Société Notre-Dame de Montréal, of which Jean-Jacques Olier was an active founder, was granted the land of Montreal from the Company of One Hundred Associates, which owned New France, with the aim of converting the indigenous population and providing schools and hospitals for both them and the colonists. The Jesuits served as missionaries for the small colony until 1657 when Olier sent four priests from the Saint-Sulpice seminary in Paris to form the first parish. In 1663, France decided to substitute direct royal administration over New France for that hitherto exercised by the Company of One Hundred Associates, and in the same year the Société Notre-Dame de Montréal ceded its possessions to the Seminaire de Saint-Sulpice. Just as in Paris, the Montreal Sulpicians had important civil responsibilities. Most notably, they acted as seigneurs for the island of Montreal.

The Sulpicians served as missionaries, judges, explorers, schoolteachers, social workers, supervisors of convents, almsmen, canal builders, urban planners, colonization agents, and entrepreneurs. Despite their large role in society and their influence in shaping early Montreal, each night they would all return to the Saint-Sulpice Seminary. The administration of the Séminaire de Montreal was modeled on that of the Séminaire de Paris, in which the company was run by the superior, the four-man Consulting Council, and the Assembly of Twelve Assistants. According to the rules of the seminary in 1764, the superior, during his five-year renewable term, was to act like a father and was to be respected. The seminary kept careful records of all employees including birthday, place of birth, marital status, and salary. Female employees posed a particular problem since although a cheap source of labour, their presence in a male religious community was problematic. The superior of the Séminaire de Montréal was inherently also the Island of Montreal's seigneur. In the case of M. Vachon de Belmont, who was responsible for the mission of La Montagne, sixth superior of the Montreal Sulpicians, the master designer of the fort and Sulpicians' residential château, and who was independently wealthy, was very well educated and had trained as draughtsman and architect, M. Belmont had a more than passing interest in military strategy and architecture. M. Belmont's military strategy stamp is also evident in the implementation of the Sault-au-Récollet's fr:Fort Lorette and the seigneurie Lac-de-Deux-Montagnes' fort.

==== Early missionary work ====
In 1668, several Sulpicians went to evangelize the Haudenosaunee in the Bay of Quinte, north of Lake Ontario, the Mi'kmaq in Acadia, the Haudenosaunee on the present site of Ogdensburg in the State of New York and, finally, the Algonquins in Abitibi and Témiscamingue. François Dollier de Casson and Brehan de Gallinée explored the region of the Great Lakes (1669), of which they made a map. In 1676 the mission of La Montagne was opened on the site of the present Séminaire de Montréal, where M. Belmont built a fort (1685). Alcohol traffic, major loss of mission housing by fire in 1694, and other factors necessitated the move of the first mission to one on the edge of the rivière des Prairies, near the Sault-au-Récollet rapids, in north end Montreal island. In 1717, the Compagnie de Saint-Sulpice de Paris was granted a concession (~10.5 miles of frontage, ~9 miles deep) named seigneurie du Lac-des-Deux-Montagnes. In 1721, the Sulpicians moved the Sault-au-Récollet mission to two villages on seigneurie Lac-des-Deux-Montagnes territory; a first village to the west, which was their former hunting grounds and came to be called Kanesatake, was assigned to the Mohawks, and, later, a village to the east was assigned to the Algonquins and the Nipissings.

=== After the Conquest ===
On April 29, 1764, the Séminaire de Saint-Sulpice de Paris executed an act of donation giving all Canadian property to the Séminaire de Montréal making possible the survival of the Sulpicians to become British subjects, loyal to the Crown. In the wake of the Conquest of 1760, the Séminaire de Montreal thus became independent from the Séminaire de Saint-Sulpice de Paris. By contrast, since 1763, other male-affiliated religious orders deemed to be too dependent on France and Rome, that is, the Récollets and Jésuit orders, were prevented from recruiting members and these religious orders properties were confiscated to become British Crown property.

In 1794 after the French Revolution, twelve Sulpicians fled persecution by the National Convention and emigrated to Montreal, Quebec. According to Pierre-Auguste Fournet, the Sulpicians of Montreal would have died out had not the British Government opened Canada to the priests persecuted during the French Revolution.

After lengthy negotiations, in 1840 the British Crown recognized the possessions of the Sulpicians, the status of which had been ambiguous since the Conquest, while also providing for the gradual termination of the seigneurial regime. This enabled the Sulpicians to keep their holdings and continue their work, while allowing landowners who so desired to make a single final payment (commutation) and be relieved of all future seigneurial dues. Inauguration in 1825 of the Lachine Canal opened up markets to the United States' interior via the Erie Canal (opened in 1822), which in turn provided the impetus for the rapid sudden development of North America's largest industrial park in the area known as Pointe-Saint-Charles, named after Charles le Moyne. A large part of Pointe-Saint-Charles was occupied by the Sulpicians' Saint-Gabriel Farm established in 1659 and named after the first superior, Gabriel de Queylus.

At the request of Bishop Ignace Bourget, in 1840 the Sulpicians took over the diocesan school of theology, creating the famous Grand Séminaire de Montréal. Since 1857 it has been located on Sherbrooke Street near Atwater Avenue. This operation enabled the Montreal Sulpicians to expand their primary work, the education of priests. They have trained innumerable priests and bishops, Canadian and American, down to the present day.

Canadian Sulpicians may be found operating in seminaries in Montreal and Edmonton. In 1972 the Canadian Province established a Provincial Delegation for Latin America, based in Bogotá, Colombia. In Latin America, the Society functions in Brazil (Brasília and Londrina) and Colombia (Cali, Cúcuta and Manizales). They have also served in Fukuoka, Japan since 1933.

In 2006, the Society of St. Sulpice of Montreal created Univers culturel de Saint-Sulpice, a non-profit organization whose mission is to ensure the preservation, accessibility and outreach of the archives, movable heritage assets and old and rare books of their community.

The rare book collections situated at the Grand Séminaire de Montréal Library (now Institut de formation théologique de Montréal), and the Séminaire Saint-Sulpice located in Old Montreal, host different collections from different institutions Sulpicians created from the 17th century to the 20th century (Séminaire Saint-Sulpice, Collège de Montréal, Grand Séminaire de Montréal, Séminaire de Philosophie, Collège pontifical canadien de Rome, and Collège André Grasset). These books span from the late Middle Ages to the mid 20th century. The works in these libraries were used for teaching and for the enrichment of knowledge on various subjects, allowing the Sulpicians to fulfill their mission as educators. These collections are an expression of scholarly culture. They provide information on the social and intellectual concerns of Quebec's elites, on the evolution of ideas in many fields between the seventeenth and nineteenth centuries, and on the value of the education provided at the time. In 2021, these collections (including archives and moveable heritage assets) were added to the Cultural Heritage Act of Quebec.

== In the United States ==
Sulpicians set foot in what is now the United States as early as 1670 when Fathers Dollier de Casson and Brehan de Galinee from Brittany landed in what would later become Detroit, Michigan. In 1684 Robert de la Salle headed an ill-fated expedition from France to what is now Texas, taking with him three priests, all Sulpicians. These were Fathers Dollier de Casson, Brehan de Galinee, and Jean Cavelier, the explorer's older brother. This expedition ended in failure, and the vessel carrying the three Sulpicians was shipwrecked in what is now the state of Texas. Among the survivors were the three Sulpicians, two of whom returned to France on the next available vessel. The third, Dollier de Casson, decided to remain to catechize the natives. This, after all, was a major motive for his coming. He met with little success in this endeavor, however, and finally decided to return to France as had his companions. His missionary zeal unslaked, he soon found a vessel to transfer him to the Sulpician enterprise in Montreal, which was quite successful and has endured down to the present day.

In July 1791, four Sulpicians, newly arrived from France, established the first Catholic institution for the training of clergy in the newly formed United States: St. Mary's Seminary in Baltimore. They were Francis Charles Nagot, Anthony Gamier, Michael Levadoux, and John Tessier, who had fled the French Revolution. Purchasing the One Mile Tavern then on the edge of the city, they dedicated the house to the Blessed Virgin. In October they opened classes with five students whom they had brought from France, and thereby established the first enduring community of the Society in the nation.

In March, 1792 three more priests arrived, Abbé Chicoisneau, Abbé John Baptist Mary David, and Abbé Benedict Joseph Flaget. Two seminarians arrived with them, Stephen T. Badin and another named Barret. They were joined in June of that same year by the Abbés Ambrose Maréchal, Gabriel Richard and Francis Ciquard. Many of these early priests were sent as missionaries to remote areas of the United States and its territories. Flaget and David founded the Catholic Seminary of St. Thomas, at Bardstown, Kentucky. It was the first seminary west of the Appalachians. Their St. Thomas Catholic Church, built there in 1816, is the oldest surviving brick church in Kentucky. In 1796, Louis William Valentine Dubourg arrived and became the president of Georgetown University. Later he became the first bishop of the Louisiana Territory.

A decade later, Dubourg was instrumental in the transfer from New York City of the widow and recent convert Elizabeth Seton, who had been unsuccessful in her efforts to run a school, in part to care for her family. With his encouragement, she and other women drawn to the vision of caring for the poor in a religious way of life came to found the first American congregation of Sisters in 1809. The Sulpicians served as their religious superiors until 1850, when the original community located there chose to merge with another religious institute of Sisters. In 1829, Sulpician Fr. James Joubert worked with Mary Lange, a Haitian immigrant, to establish the first community of black sisters in the United States, the Oblate Sisters of Providence.

The Society helped to found and staff for a time St. John's Seminary, part of the Archdiocese of Boston (1884–1911). In that same period, for a brief time they also staffed St. Joseph Seminary, serving the Archdiocese of New York (1896–1906). The Sulpicians who staffed that institution chose to leave the Society and become part of the archdiocese. Among their number was Francis Gigot.

In 1898, at the invitation of the Archbishop of San Francisco, Patrick William Riordan, the Sulpicians founded what was, until 2017, their primary institution on the West Coast, Saint Patrick Seminary, Menlo Park, California. From the 1920s until about 1971, the Society operated St. Edward Seminary in Kenmore, Washington. The grounds now form Saint Edward State Park and Bastyr University. For a brief period in the 1990s, the Sulpicians were also involved in teaching at St. John's Seminary in Camarillo, the college seminary for the Archdiocese of Los Angeles.

In 1917, the construction of the Sulpician Seminary began in Washington, D.C., next to The Catholic University of America. The seminary, which became an independent institution in 1924, changed its name to Theological College in 1940. It has graduated over 1,500 priests, including 45 bishops and four cardinals. American Sulpicians gained a reputation for forward-thinking at certain points of their history, to the suspicion and dissatisfaction of more conservative members of the hierarchy. They were on the cutting edge of Vatican II thinking and thus gained both friends and enemies. A constant in the Sulpician seminaries has been an emphasis on personal spiritual direction and on collegial governance.

In 1989, U.S. Sulpicians began a collaborative approach to priestly formation with the bishops of Zambia. As of 2014 the American Province has several seminary placements in Zambia and a number of new Zambian Sulpicians and Candidates.

The American Province has also distinguished itself by producing several outstanding scholars and authors in the field of theology and scriptural studies. Among the most well-known was Scripture scholar Raymond E. Brown, S.S..

== Sainthood Causes ==
Blesseds

- Bernard-François de Cucsac and 11 Companions (died 2 September 1792), Martyrs of the French Revolution, beatified on 17 October 1926
- Charles-René Collas du Bignon (25 August 1743 - 3 June 1794), Martyr of the French Revolution, beatified on 1 October 1995
- Joseph Juge de Saint-Martin (4 June 1739 - 7 July 1794), Martyr of the French Revolution, beatified on 1 October 1995
- Claude-Joseph Jouffret de Bonnefont (23 December 1752 - 10 August 1794), Martyr of the French Revolution, beatified on 1 October 1995

Servants of God

- Jean-Jacques Olier (20 September 1608 – 2 April 1657), founder of the Society
- Jacques-Martin Ploquin (3 February 1766 - 25 February 1794), Martyr of the French Revolution

== Sulpicians today ==
The 2012 Annuario Pontificio gave 293 as the number of priest members as of 31 December 2010.

== List of superiors general ==
The following is a chronological list of superiors general of the Society of the Priests of Saint Sulpice:

1. Jean-Jacques Olier (1641–1657)
2. Alexandre Le Ragois de Bretonvilliers (1657–1676)
3. Louis Tronson (1676–1700)
4. François Leschassier (1700–1725)
5. Charles-Maurice Le Peletier (1725–1731)
6. Jean Cousturier (1731–1770)
7. Claude Bourachot (1770–1777)
8. Pierre Le Gallic (1777–1782)
9. Jacques-André Emery (1782–1811)
10. Antoine du Pouget Duclaux (1814–1826)
11. Antoine Garnier (1826–1845)
12. Louis de Courson (1845–1850)
13. Joseph Carrière (1850–1864)
14. Michel Caval (1864–1875)
15. Joseph-Henri Icard (1875–1893)
16. Arthur-Jules Captier (1893–1901)
17. Jules Lebas (1901–1904)
18. Henri Garriguet (1904–1929)
19. Jean Verdier (1929–1940)
20. Pierre Boisard (1945–1952)
21. Pierre Girard (1952–1966)
22. Jean-Baptiste Brunon (1966–1972)
23. Constant Bouchaud (1972–1984)
24. Raymond Deville (1984–1996)
25. Lawrence B. Terrien (1996–2008)
26. Ronald D. Witherup (2008–2022)
27. Shayne Craig (2022-present)

== List of Canadian Province Superiors ==
1. Gabriel de Thubières de Queylus (1657-1661, 1668-1671)
2. Gabriel Souart (1661-1667)
3. Dominique Galinier (1667-1668)
4. François Dollier de Casson (1671-1674, 1678-1701)
5. François Joseph Lefebvre (1676-1678)
6. François Vachon de Belmont (1701-1732)
7. Louis Normant du Faradon (1732-1759)
8. Étienne Montgolfier (1759-1791)
9. Jean Brassier (1791-1798)
10. Jean-Henry-Auguste Roux (1798-1831)
11. Joseph-Vincent Quiblier (1831-1846)
12. Pierre-Louis Billaudèle (1846-1856)
13. Dominique Granet (1856-1866)
14. Joseph-Alexandre Baile (1866-1881)
15. Frédéric-Louis Colin (1881-1902)
16. Charles Lecoq (1902-1917)
17. Narcisse-Amable Troie (1917-1919)
18. René Labelle (1919-1931)
19. Roméo Neveu (1931-1938)
20. Eugène Moreau (1938-1947)
21. Mgr Henri Jeannotte (1947-1949)
22. Maximilien Lacombe (1949-1954)
23. Jean-Paul Laurence (1954-1966)
24. Mgr Édouard Gagnon (1966-1970)
25. Roland Dorris (1970-1982)
26. Émilius Goulet (1982-1994)
27. Lionel Gendron (1994-2006)
28. Jacques D'Arcy (2006–2018)
29. Jorge Pacheco (2018-)

Source: https://sulpc.org/devenir-formateur/

== Notable members ==
- Raymond E. Brown
- John Francis Cronin
- Étienne-Michel Faillon
- Joseph Martin
- Georges Morand
- Marc Ouellet
- Emmanuel Célestin Suhard
- Joseph Tixeront, Theologian of the late 19th and early 20th Century
- François du Plessis de Grenédan (1921–2013), a chaplain of the FTP and FFI maquisards of the Saint-Nazaire Pocket during World War 2.

== See also ==
- Collège de Montréal
- Consecrated life
- Institute of consecrated life
- Joseph Onasakenrat
- Religious institute (Catholic)
- Secular institute
- Vocational discernment in the Catholic Church
