= Gabriel Souart =

French priest (1611-1691)

Abbé Gabriel Souart (c. 1611 – 8 March 1691) was a Sulpicien priest and the nephew of Father Joseph Le Caron. He is most often remembered in Canadian history as the first parish priest of Montreal.

Souart entered the priesthood later in life, having previously studied and practiced medicine. He became a priest in 1650 and was sent to New France to help found the Séminaire de Montréal. At the same time he began to organize the parish which had previously been ministered to by the Jesuits as a group since 1642. He also acted as an able replacement for his superior, Abbé Queylus, chaplain of the Notre-Dame congregation and Hôtel-Dieu de Montréal.
