= Quebec Federation of Real Estate Boards =

The Quebec Federation of Real Estate Boards (QFREB), or Fédération des Chambres immobilières du Québec (FCIQ), represents the 12,000+ real estate brokers and salespeople who are members of Quebec's 12 real estate boards.

== History ==
- 1991 - QFREB founded

== See also ==
- Canadian Real Estate Association
- Greater Montreal Real Estate Board
- Multiple Listing Service
