= 2023 Old Montreal fire =

2023 fire in Montreal

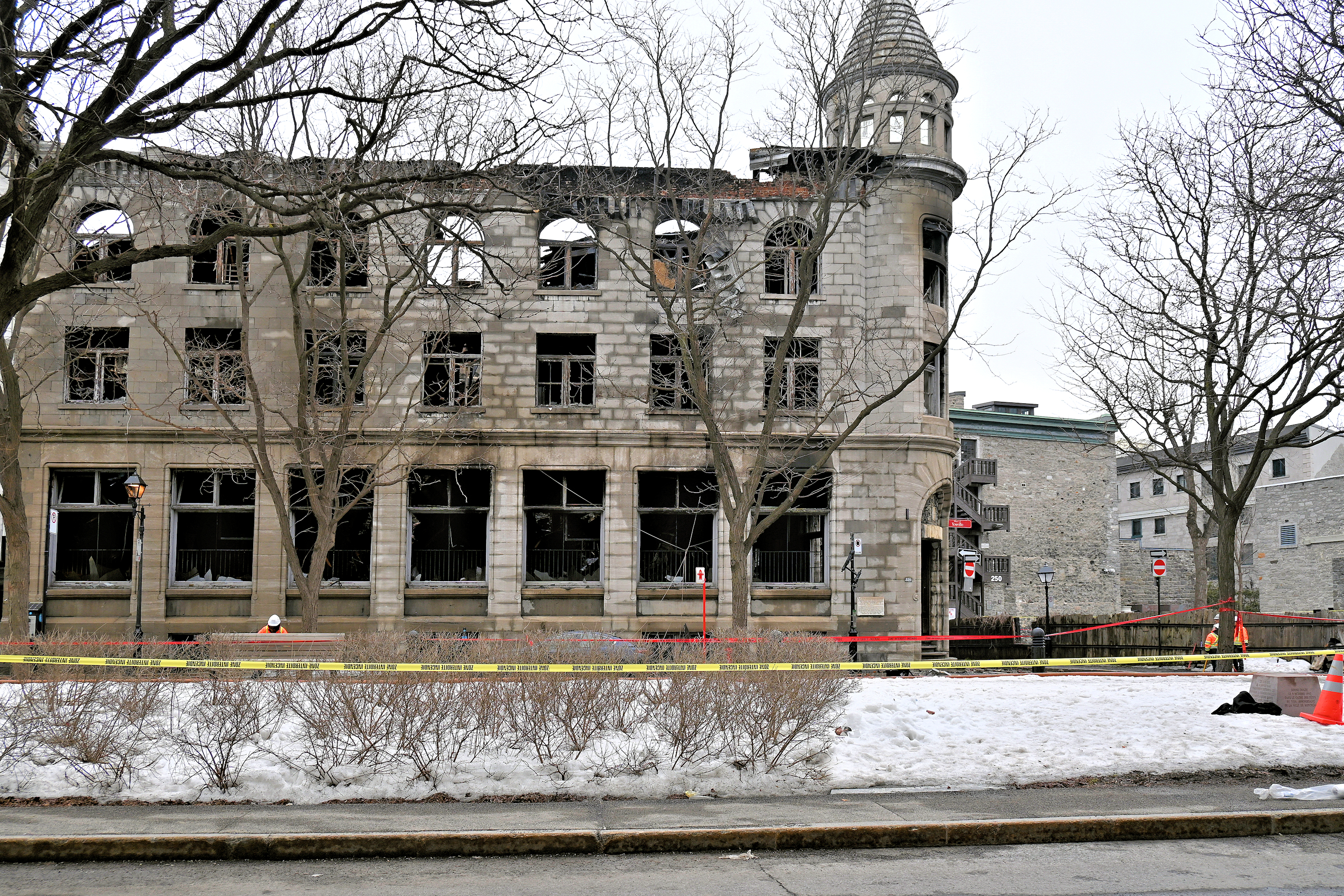
- Aftermath of the fire, day after on March 17, 2023.
- Date: 16 March 2023
- Time: 05:45 a.m. EST (fire began)
- Duration: 4 hours (under control)
- Location: 224 Place d’Youville/ 35 rue du Port, Old Montreal, Montreal, Quebec, Canada; 45.5019°N 73.5546°W
- Type: Structure fire
- Deaths: 7
- Injuries: 15 (9 hospitalized)

On March 16, 2023, a fire destroyed a heritage property on Place d'Youville in the neighbourhood of Old Montreal, Quebec, Canada.

The building built in the 1890s was known as Édifice William-Watson-Ogilvie and housed offices Ogilvie Milling Company until the 1940s when it was used by government agencies In the 1960s the upper floors were converted to housing units and further expansions on dwelling numbers were completed in the 1970s and 1980s. In 1994 the ground floor began using the space for their offices. The property was classified as being located in the cultural heritage site of the founding of Montreal in 1999.

There were 22 people in the building at the time of the fire. The fire killed seven of those people, six of whom were Airbnb tenants.

== Casualties ==
Victims included Charlie Lacroix (age 18), Walid Belkahla (18), Dr. An Wu (31), Dania Zafar (31), Saniya Khan (31), Nathan Sears (35), and Camille Maheux (78).

At least two of the victims, Nathan Sears and An Wu, were academics who were visiting Montreal for conferences.

The first identified of the victims, Camille Maheux, was a photographer and filmmaker whose pieces can be found in the collection of the National Gallery of Canada. Maheux was a long-term tenant of the building having lived there for over 30 years.

== Prior safety concerns ==
On Sunday May 20, 2018, of the Victoria Day long weekend, at approximately 07:00 p.m., Service de sécurité incendie de Montréal responded to a stove-top fire call from a resident renting a room in a short term housing section of the building on the second story.

The kitchen of the second story multi-room short term rental unit at 35 rue du Port, June 2018

The fire department indicated to the resident after clearing and inspecting the building, that building owner Émile-Haim Benamor would be issued a fine due to improper fire escape access, and non-functioning smoke detectors in the section of the building that the resident inhabited with residents of four other rooms. The fire department also communicated that the short term rental the resident inhabited was illegal, and that building owner Émile-Haim Benamor would also be fined and issued an order to cease the operation of the short term rental.

The resident inquired with relevant city departments upon learning of the fire in 2023, and was told no such fine or order was issued after the 2018 fire department emergency response. Further requests from the resident for updates remain unanswered as of 2024.

== AirBnB ==
The building had Airbnb rental units despite the fact that they are illegal in the part of Old Montreal where the building is located. The city of Montreal claims that there were never any official complaints that there were illegal Airbnb rentals in the building. Montreal mayor Valerie Plante stated that cities have limited means to respond to illegal listings and that in order to investigate they must receive formal complaints.

In 2022, a complaint was made by an Airbnb guest to the company regarding a rental unit concerning security and safety issues including a window that had been glued shut.

After the fire, Airbnb announced it would crackdown on illegal rentals. Part of these measures on the provincial level would include ensuring new listings had a Corporation de l’industrie touristique du Québec (CITQ) permit number, removing listings without permits, and providing a tool to the government of Quebec to ensure Airbnb host compliance. Prior to the fire Airbnb did not require rentals to prove that they possessed a CITQ permit.

In response to the fire, the National Assembly of Quebec passed Bill 25 which consisted of amendments to the Tourist Accommodation Act to enforce restrictions on short term rental companies like Airbnb Under the new legislation, companies must ensure that all listings are legal or face a fine of $100,000 and individuals may be fined up to $50,000 for providing a fake CITQ permit. However, permits are provided only as PDFs and Airbnb contested that there is no way to verify if permits have been faked or altered as they can only be manually checked by Airbnb.

In August 2023, the city of Montreal launched a task-force to inspect alleged short term rentals to determine if the rental was being operated illegally and issue municipal fines.

== Legal proceedings and actions ==
=== Inquests and investigations ===
In April 2023, Quebec's Chief Coroner said that it will hold an inquest into the deaths of the victims of the fire.

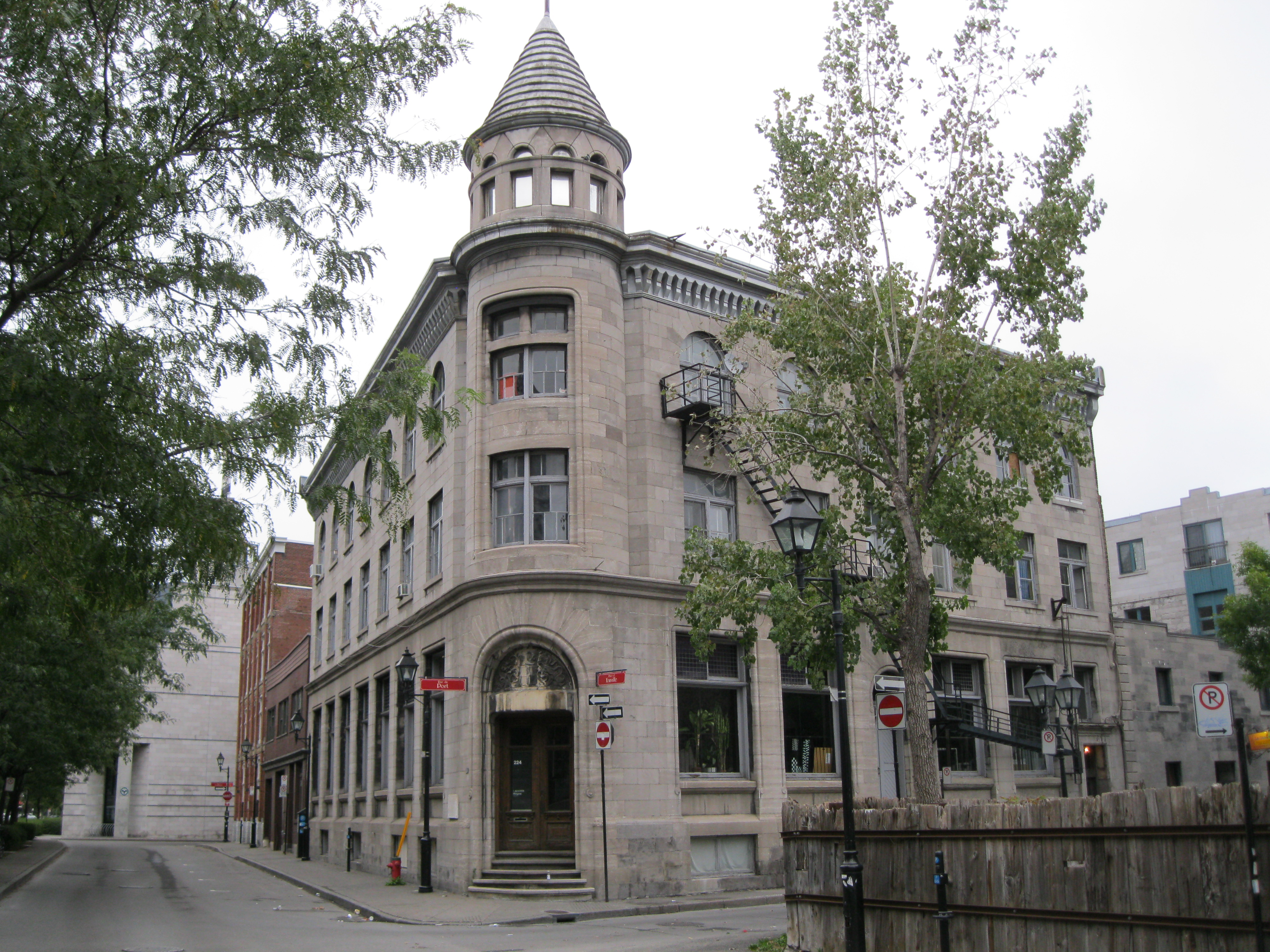
The William-Watson-Ogilvie building in 2012.

On August 28, 2023, Montreal police announced that an accidental cause for the fire had been ruled out and the case was being considered as suspected arson. Traces of an accelerant were found at the site though details had not been shared to preserve the integrity of the criminal investigation. The coroner's inquest has been paused pending the results of the investigation.

On October 26, 2023, Radio Canada reported Montreal Police suspected Denis Bégin for starting the fire. Bégin is a convicted murderer and escaped a minimum security facility in Laval, Quebec on Feb. 15, 2019, he was still on the lam when the fire occurred. Montreal Police investigators linked Bégin to the fire when he was seen on security cameras fleeing the scene, but Bégin has not been formally charged.

=== Lawsuits ===
Days after the fire, father of victim Nathan Sears launched a lawsuit on behalf of the victims against the building's owner Émile-Haim Benamor.

In September 2023 Pointe-à-Callière, an archaeological museum located near the site of the fire, launched a lawsuit against the city of Montreal for failing to follow up on safety violations in the building. As a result of the fire, the museum suffered three million dollars in damages.

Building owner Émile-Haim Benamor filed a lawsuit against the city of Montreal in September 2023 accusing that the strict restrictions the city has on renovations to heritage units contributed to the severity of the fire. He also accuses that city did not send an adequate number of firefighters to control the blaze.

On September 15, 2023, the family of victim Charlie Lacroix launched a lawsuit against building owner Émile-Haim Benamor, Tariq Hasan, and the city of Montreal.

On March 18, 2026, the owner of the building was charged with manslaughter and criminal negligence.
