= François Dollier de Casson =

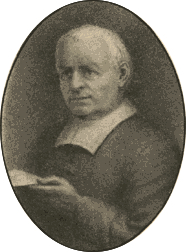
François Dollier de Casson

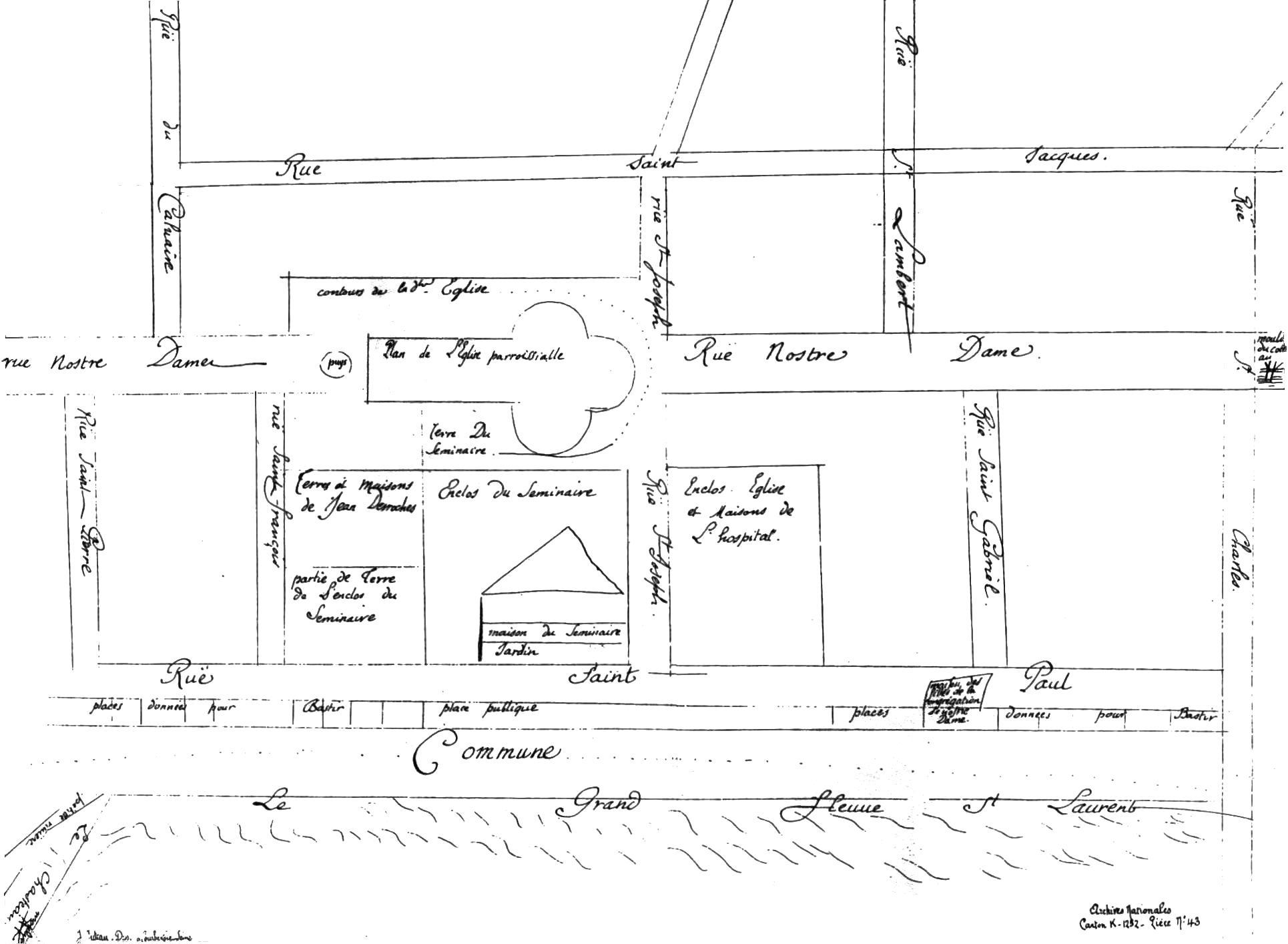
de Casson's street plan of Montreal, 1672.

François Dollier de Casson (1636 – 27 September 1701) was born in Vitré, Province of Brittany, France, into a wealthy bourgeois and military family. He began his adult life in the army which he left after three years to continue his studies and become a priest.

After becoming a Sulpician, he was assigned to New France, an assignment he took with some reluctance. He arrived in Quebec in 1666 and was immediately sent as a military chaplain with Prouville de Tracy in an action against the Mohawks. He was active as a missionary and explorer until becoming superior of the Sulpicians in New France in 1671. He also built the first canal.

In 1674, François returned to France for an extended rest and served as preceptor to his nephew. He returned to Canada in 1678 and served the Sulpicians until his death.

François Dollier de Casson is perhaps best known for his Histoire de Montréal. He also contributed to church architecture and served as vicar general of the diocese of Quebec. He ordered the first street survey of Montreal, executed by notary and surveyor Bénigne Basset Des Lauriers, creating the street layout of what is now known as Old Montreal. He was one of the key figures of the first attempt to dig the Lachine Canal, in 1689.
