= Dominican University College =

Defunct pontifical university in Ottawa, Canada

- Collège universitaire dominicain
- Former names: Dominican College of Philosophy and Theology
- Motto: "Discover Wisdom"
- Type: Public
- Active: 1900–2024
- Religious affiliation: Roman Catholic
- Academic affiliations: Carleton University, AUCC, IAU, AUFC
- Location: 96 Empress Avenue; Ottawa, Ontario; K1R 7G3; 45°24′40.02″N 75°42′32.92″W
- Campus: Urban
- Colours: Dark blue, yellow, light blue
- Website: www.dom.edu

The Dominican University College (DUC; French: Collège universitaire dominicain) was a bilingual university located in Ottawa, Ontario, Canada. From 2012 to its closure in 2024, Dominican University College was an affiliated college of Carleton University.

Founded in 1900 and granted a civil university charter in 1967, Dominican University College was modelled on the houses of studies of the Order of Preachers and was originally the centre of graduate studies for Canadian Dominicans. The Dominican University College offered civil and pontifical bachelor's, master's, and doctoral degrees in philosophy and theology.

== History ==
The Saint-Jean-Baptiste church was completed in November 1872 at the corner of Primrose and Victoria Avenue (now Empress) in Ottawa. The adjoining Dominican convent and house of studies opened in 1899, modelled after the medieval studium generale specializing in Philosophy and Theology. In 1900, the Dominicans brought their School of Theology to Ottawa, followed shortly thereafter by courses in Philosophy in 1902, and granted ecclesiastical degrees at the level of licentiate. The first regent of the university, from 1900 to 1920, was Raymond-Marie Rouleau, who would later become Archbishop of Quebec and then a Cardinal.

In 1930, the Institut d'Etudes Medievales d'Ottawa was established at the convent as the French-speaking equivalent to the Institute of Mediaeval Studies at St. Michael's College of the University of Toronto, founded in 1929. Étienne Gilson and Marie-Dominique Chenu were instrumental in the founding of the institute, which relocated to the Université de Montréal in 1942.

On February 8, 1931, a fire destroyed the original Saint-Jean-Baptiste church and portions of the convent. The rebuilt church and convent were opened on Easter 1932.

In 1967, a civil charter was granted to the Collège dominicain de philosophie et de théologie by the Ontario Government, allowing the college to offer civil university degrees in philosophy and theology. The first Doctorate in Theology from the Dominican College was granted in 1971. In 1974, the Dominican College joined the Association of Universities and Colleges of Canada. The university opened its undergraduate and graduate programs in Philosophy to English-speaking students in 1992 and 1997, respectively, and established English undergraduate and graduate programs in Theology in 2003 and 2007. The College closed in 2024.

The building that housed the Dominican Monastery and the Dominican University College has several architecturally interesting and historically significant features, including cloister vault ceilings, stained glass by Guido Nincheri, and a Casavant Frères organ. In June 2024, the building was sold to Les Ecoles Catholiques Centre-Est for use as a francophone secondary school .

== Research ==
The Faculty of Philosophy at DUC specialized in the history of philosophy, modern European philosophy, and Aristotelian-Thomistic metaphysics. Faculty members came from both the analytic and continental traditions.

The Faculty of Theology had strengths in New Testament hermeneutics and value personalism.

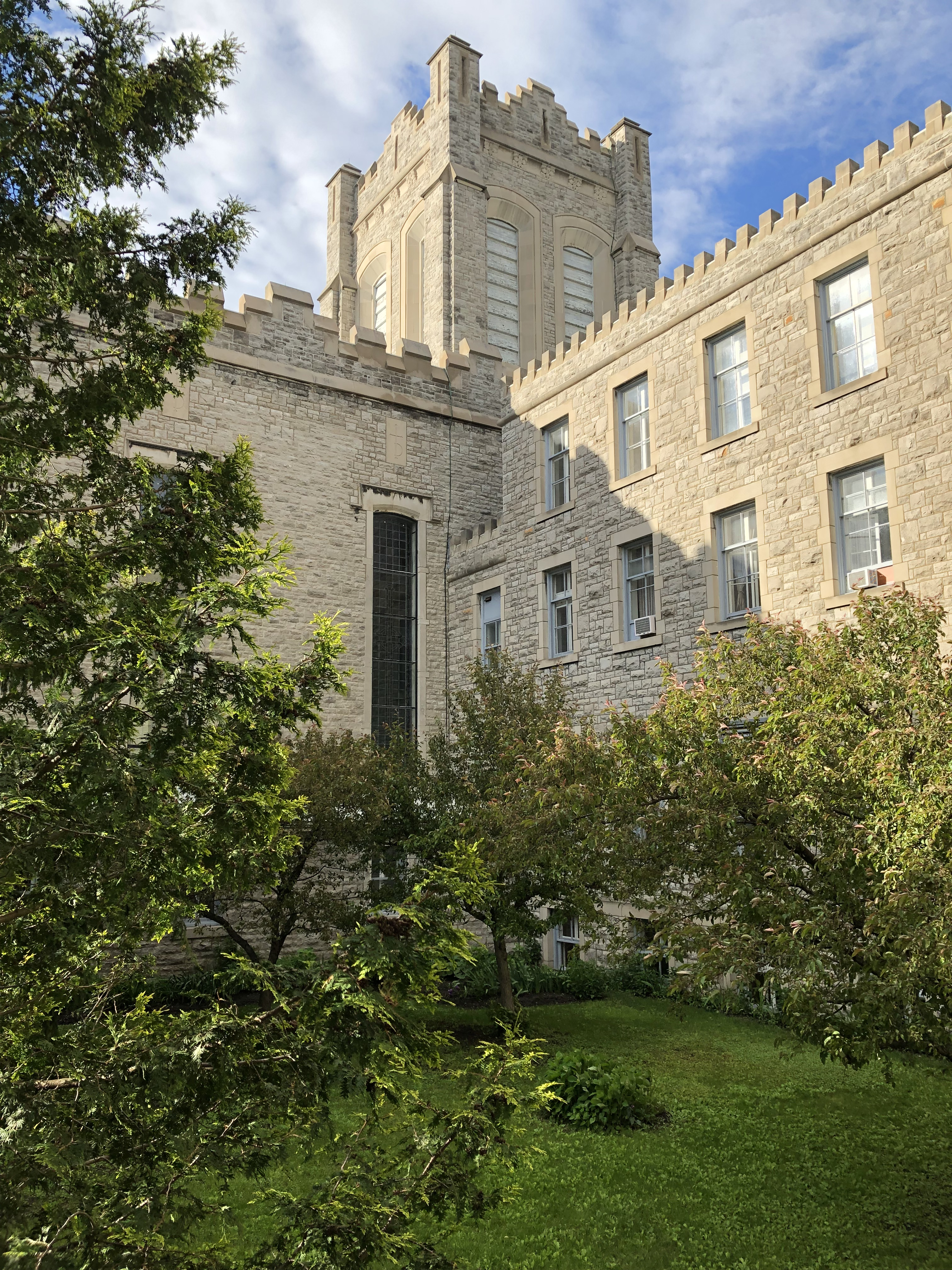
View of St-Jean-Baptiste Church from the inner garden

=== Science et Esprit ===
The journal Science et Esprit, first established in 1948 under the name Sciences Ecclésiastiques by professors in the Faculty of the Society of Jesus in Montreal, specializes in philosophy and theology, and publishes articles in both English and French. The journal ceased publication in 2024 with Volume 76, number 3.

== Student Association ==
The Association Étudiants Collège Dominicain (AECDO) elected representatives to sit on the boards for both the Faculty of Philosophy and of the Faculty of Theology. It organized and directed various activities (extracurricular, social justice committee, social gathering) pertaining to student life.

== Academics ==
=== Faculty of Philosophy ===
Undergraduate Programs

- Bachelor of Philosophy (Honours)
- Bachelor of Philosophy (Honours) with minor in Ethics
- Bachelor of Arts (Honours) with major in Philosophy and minor in Theology
- Bachelor of Arts with a concentration in Philosophy
- Bachelor of Arts in Philosophy with minor in Ethics

Graduate Programs

- Master of Arts in Philosophy
- Doctorate in Philosophy

=== Faculty of Theology ===
Undergraduate Programs

- Bachelor in Theology
- Bachelor of Arts with major in Theology and minor in Philosophy

Graduate Programs

- Master of Arts in Theology and Licenciate
- Master of Theology
- Doctorate in Theology (Ph.D. / Canonical Degree)

== Partnerships ==
=== Institut de pastorale des Dominicains ===
In 1967, DUC partnered with the Institut de pastorale des Dominicains in Montreal. The institute was founded in 1960 by the Dominican Order during the construction of the convent of Saint Albert the Great, and offered French programs in pastoral or liturgical theology or in catechism, leading to university certificates, bachelor's and master's degrees.

=== Carleton University ===
From 2012 to 2024 DUC was affiliated with Carleton University. Students at Dominican were entered into Carleton's student enrollment system, had access to its library, and – apart from those pursuing professional, ecclesiastical studies – received their diplomas jointly from both institutions. Carleton students could take electives at Dominican and vice versa. Their affiliation agreement was renewed in 2018.

Students of the DUC were also permitted to take courses within the Faculty of Arts at the University of Ottawa.

The DUC was a member of the Association of Universities and Colleges of Canada and of L'Association des collèges et universités de la francophonie canadienne, a network of academic institutions of the Canadian Francophonie.

== Dominican University College Foundation ==
The Dominican University College Foundation is a public charitable organization whose sole purpose is to raise funds for DUC and the Institut de pastorale in order to help build its future and support students and faculty through bursaries and endowed research chairs.

== Notable people and alumni ==
- Leslie Armour - former professor of philosophy, known for his work on Canadian philosophy and economics
- Benoît Lacroix - philosopher, theologian, and medievalist

== See also ==
- Higher education in Ontario
- List of colleges and universities named after people
- Ontario Student Assistance Program
