= Dominican Pastoral Institute =

Branch of Dominican University College in Montreal, Quebec

Coordinates: 45°30′23″N 73°37′16″W

- Type: Public
- Active: 1967–2024
- Religious affiliation: Roman Catholic
- Academic affiliations: AUCC, IAU, AUFC
- Faculty: 10 professors and two staff
- Location: Montreal, Quebec, Canada
- Campus: Urban
- Website: www.ipastorale.ca

Dominican Pastoral Institute also known as the Institut de pastorale des Dominicains was the Montreal, Quebec branch of the Dominican University College, a Roman Catholic university based in Ottawa, Ontario. The institute offered, in French, programs in pastoral or liturgical theology or in catechism, leading to university certificates and bachelor's degrees.

Both the Dominican Pastoral Institute and Dominican University College closed in 2024.

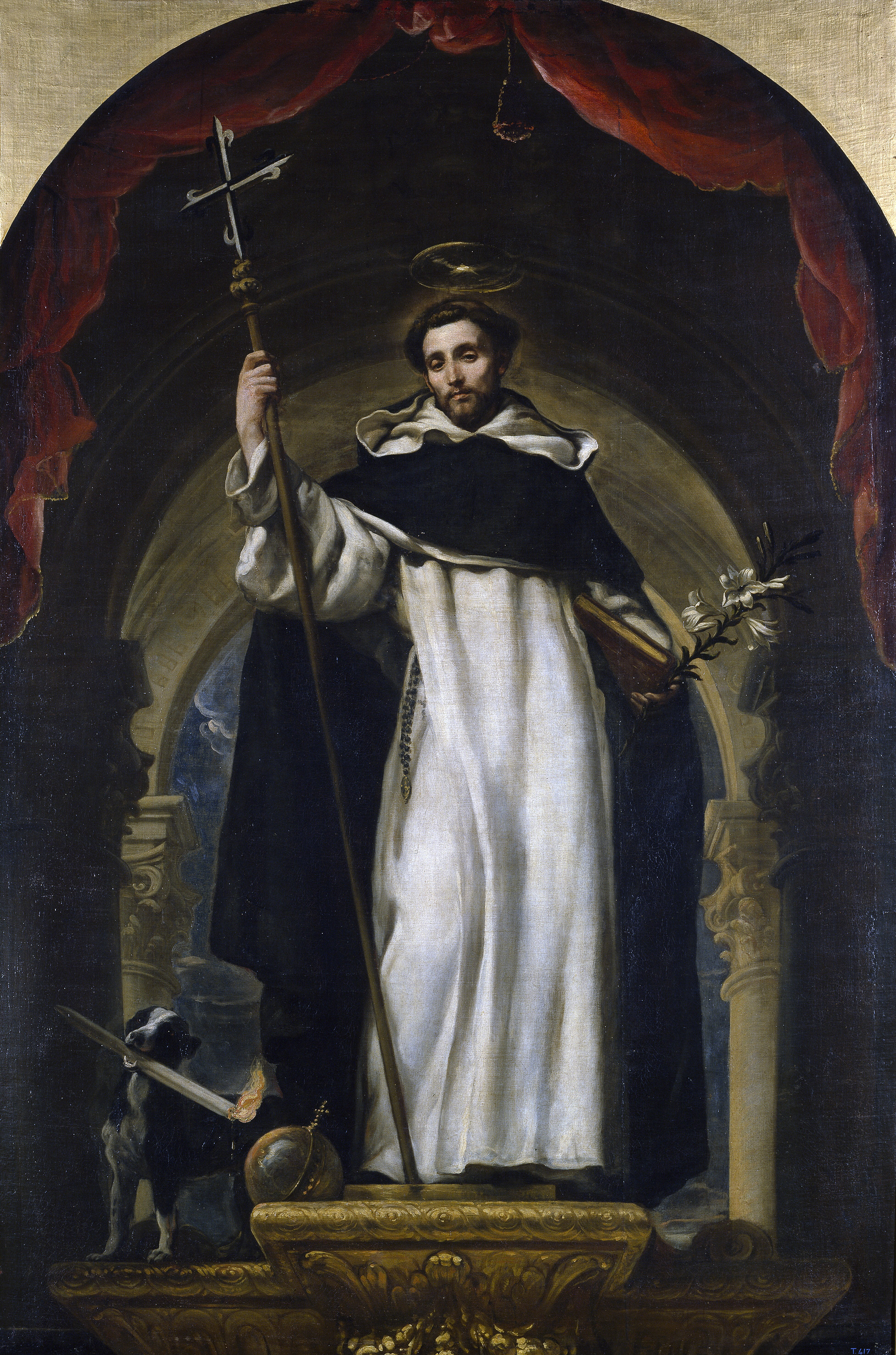
Saint Dominic

== History ==
The DPI was founded in 1960 in Montreal, Quebec by the Dominican Order during the construction of the Convent Saint-Albert-le-Grand. It offered programs in French concerning pastoral and liturgical theology as well as catechesis, leading to university certificates and bachelor's degrees.

The Institute partnered with the Dominican College in Ottawa, Ontario, which had acquired university status in 1967.

The institute consisted of ten professors and two staff and the motto was "C'est l'université à taille humaine" (This is the university with a human dimension).

=== 2019 financial crisis ===
Near the end of 2019, under serious financial stress, a conflict developed between the institute and the college, and the director was fired, as well as the interim director later. Two teachers resigned as consequence as well as the dean of the theology faculty.

Both the Dominican Pastoral Institute in Montreal and Dominican University College in Ottawa closed in 2024.
