= Thomas McCord =

Canadian politician

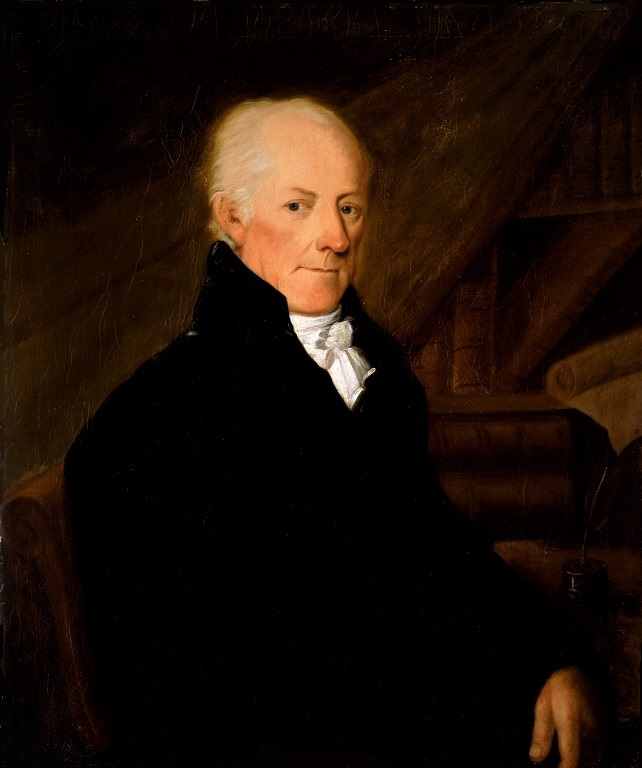
Portrait of Thomas McCord, 1816

Thomas McCord (February 7, 1750 – December 5, 1824) was an Irish-born businessman and political figure in Lower Canada.

Born 1750 at Antrim, County Antrim, Ireland, he was the fifth son of John McCord (1711–1793), a merchant, and his first wife, Margery Ellis (died c.1755). In 1764, the McCord family joined their father at Quebec City, where he had been supplying the army immediately after British Conquest of New France.

McCord entered business as a merchant at Quebec and Montreal. He was director of the Montréal Distillery Company from 1787 through 1788, and was named a justice of the peace in 1788. McCord was also provincial grand secretary for the freemasons. He travelled to Ireland on business in 1796, only returning in 1805; during this time, his business suffered some setbacks and his property was seized for unpaid debts.

In 1798, he married Sarah Solomons, the daughter of Montreal merchant Levy Solomons, at London. On his return, he again established himself as a merchant. In 1809, he was elected to the Legislative Assembly of Lower Canada for Montreal West; he was elected again for Bedford in 1816. In the assembly, he generally supported the English party.

McCord served as a lieutenant in the local militia. He helped establish a paid police force in Montreal and also served as a police magistrate there. With Jean-Marie Mondelet, McCord served as chairman for the Court of Quarter Sessions. McCord was also a member of the Freemasons.

== Death ==
He died of cancer at Montreal in 1824, aged 74.

== Sons ==
His sons, William King McCord and John Samuel McCord, became judges of the Supreme Court of Lower Canada.
