= Thomas Porteous (merchant) =

Canadian businessman and politician

Thomas Porteous (December 8, 1765 – February 2, 1830) was a merchant, seigneur and politician in Lower Canada. He represented Effingham in the Legislative Assembly of Lower Canada from 1804 to 1808.

Probably born in Quebec of Scottish descent, although one source states that he was born in Ayrshire, Porteous owned Île Bourdon where he operated a trading post and a ferry service between Lachenaie and the Island of Montreal. In 1786, he married Olivia Everest. Around 1790, he established a business on Île Jésus and then, four years later, at Terrebonne. In 1800, he purchased the seigneury of Terrebonne and, five years later, opened a store at Sainte-Thérèse-de-Blainville, where he also produced potash. Porteous also supplied material to the military during the War of 1812. Around the same time, he established a general store in Montreal. Porteous was an agent for the Saint-Maurice ironworks and helped establish the Lachine Canal, serving as one of the government commissioners. He also petitioned for the incorporation of the Bank of Montreal and served as one its directors. In 1819, he became vice-president of the Montreal Savings Bank. In the same year, with others in his family, he took over the operation of the Montreal Water Works and became its president; the wooden pipes were replaced by iron ones and a steam-powered pumping plant was added. Porteous served as lieutenant-colonel in the militia and was a prominent member of the local Presbyterian Church. He died in Montreal at the age of 64.
