= PS Accommodation =

First successful steamboat built in North America

The Canadian paddle steamer Accommodation was the first successful steamboat built entirely in North America.

Financed by brewer John Molson, she was constructed by John Jackson and John Bruce in Montréal in 1809, using engines built in Forges du Saint-Maurice, Trois-Rivières (long known for ironmongery). At a cost of £2000 she had two open-faced paddle wheels and an optional sail.

Her maiden voyage was a thirty-six-hour run from Montréal to Québec City on November 3, 1809.

She was not a commercial success; by 1810, Molson had lost £4000 on her, and she was broken up for scrap. She nevertheless pioneered steam packets on the St. Lawrence River and Great Lakes; by 1819, there were seven in regular service on the river, while the lakes featured PS Frontenac on Lake Ontario, General Stacey Smyth on the Saint John River, and SS Royal William (famous for making the first transatlantic crossing under steam in 1831) on the Québec City-Halifax run.
