= Greater Montreal Real Estate Board =

The Greater Montréal Real Estate Board (GMREB; French: Chambre immobilière du Grand Montréal, CIGM), is the second largest real estate board in Canada.

== History ==
Created in 1954, GMREB is a not-for-profit association that represents almost all of the 10,000 real estate brokers in the Montréal Metropolitan Area. It is the second largest real estate board in Canada and one of the 20 largest boards in North America.

In 2013, GMREB voted to break away from the Canadian Real Estate Association, and removed all listings from their national website, Realtor.ca.
