= Bénigne Basset Des Lauriers =

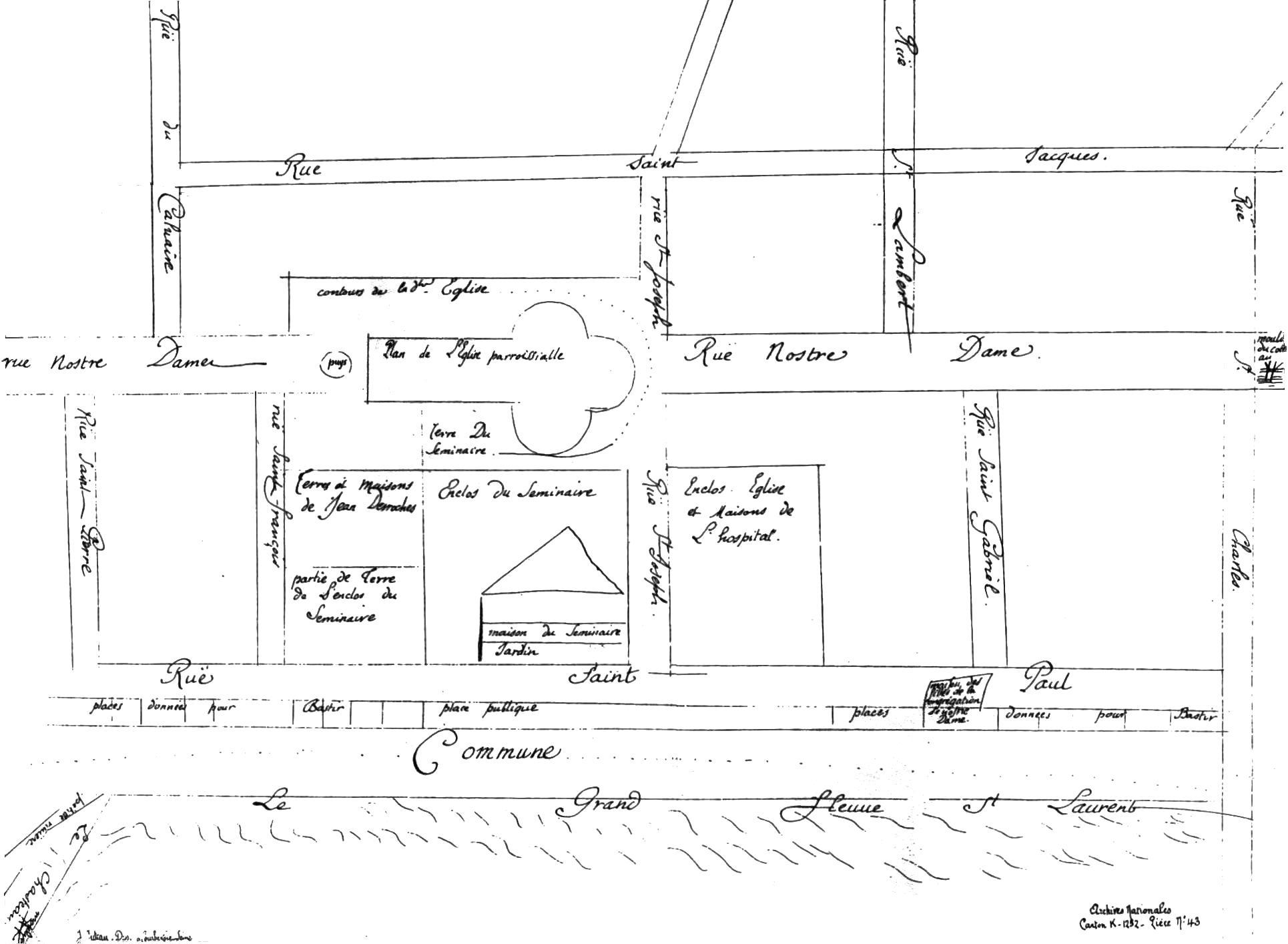
DollierRuesMontreal

Bénigne Basset Des Lauriers (c. 1639 – 4 August 1699) was born in France and gained historic importance after he emigrated to New France in 1657.

Bénigne Basset was almost immediately involved in the justice system becoming a seigneurial notary and, for a period, a royal notary. He also worked as a surveyor and was responsible for the first street layouts in Montreal in 1672. As a notary there are over 2500 acts that he signed that still exist with his signature.
