= Service de sécurité incendie de Montréal =

Service of public safety in Montréal

Operational area
- Country: Canada

Agency overview
- Established: 2002
- Annual calls: 140 402(2025)
- Employees: 2,305 uniformed 418 other & support
- Staffing: Career
- Fire chief: Richard Liebmann
- EMS level: BLS

Facilities and equipment
- Stations: 67
- Engines: 70 (4 stations have 2 engines)
- Trucks: 51
- Squads: 8
- Rescues: 3

Website
- sim.montreal.ca

The Service de sécurité incendie de Montréal (SIM; English: Montreal Fire Department, lit. 'Incendiary security service of Montreal') is responsible for fire and rescue operations in Montreal, Quebec, Canada. EMS first-response has been available in limited areas since 1976 and to the entire service area since 2009. The SIM is the 7th largest fire department in North America. The department offers Technical rescue capacity from the Technical Rescue Group (GST), which work together on Hi-Angle, collapse, confined and heavy rescue/extrication. The GST also performs structural evaluations during fire operations, in support of scene command and fire suppression teams. GST rescue consist of stations 13 ( units 213 & 613), station 27 (227 & 627) and station 47 (units 247,647, 947). The 200 units are engines/squads, the 600 units are mid size Rescue squads, and unit 947 is a rescue tender for collapse and heavy rescue equipment, hazmat response (Station 29 and 65), ice rescue (stations 15, 35, 38, 57 and 64) and nautical rescue (stations 14, 15, 35, 38, 55, 57, 64 and 66).

== History ==
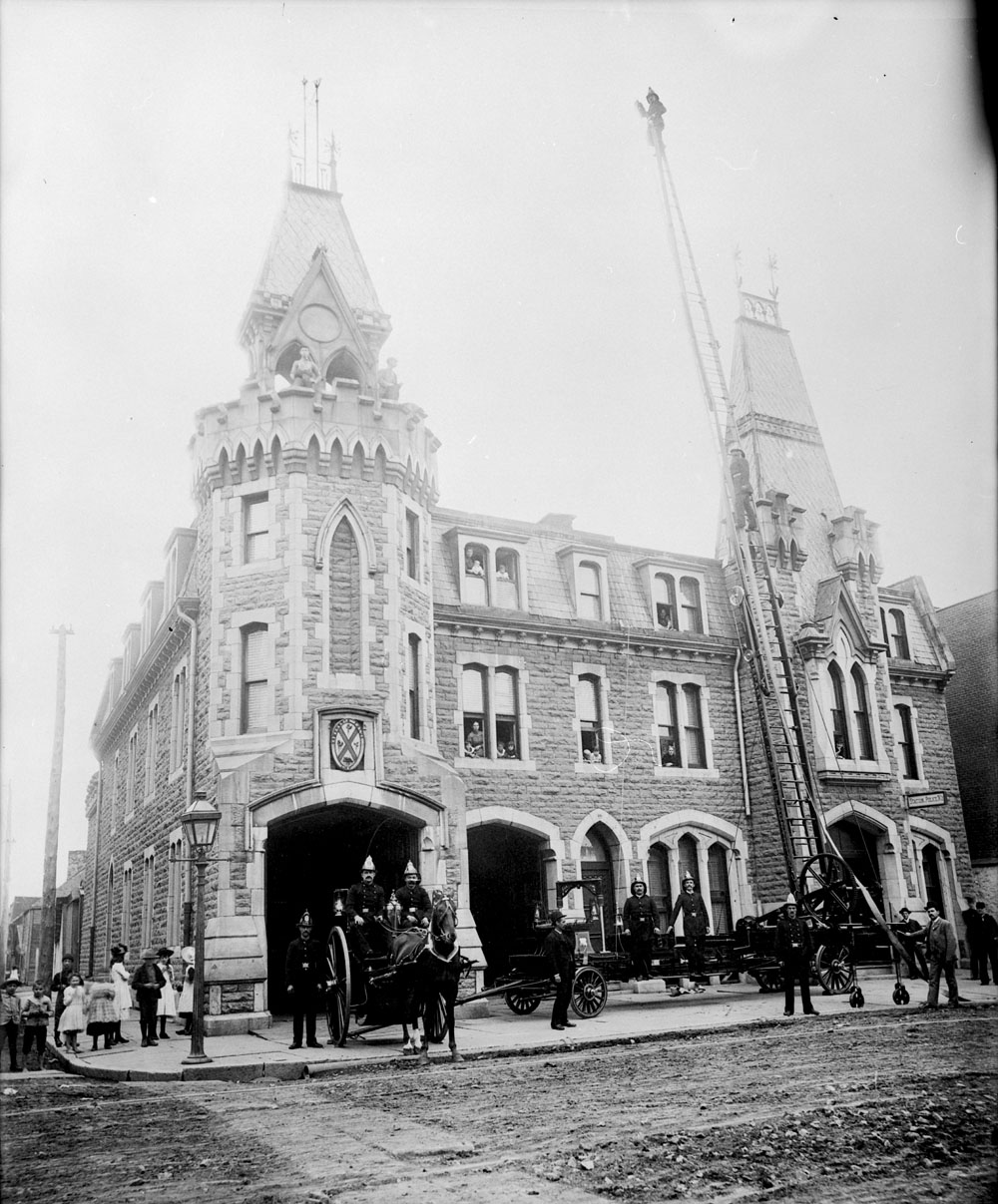
The Montreal Fire Department using fire apparatus including a La Force Langevin fire escape extension ladder, Montreal, Quebec.

Paid fire services in the city of Montreal started in 1863.

In 2002, as the result of provincially-mandated municipal mergers, the 23 existing suburban fire services were merged with the City of Montreal to form the SIM, which now serves over 1.9 million residents.

== Operations ==
There are 67 fire stations across Montreal staffed by 2,700 employees, including 2,300 fire fighters and 400 support staff.

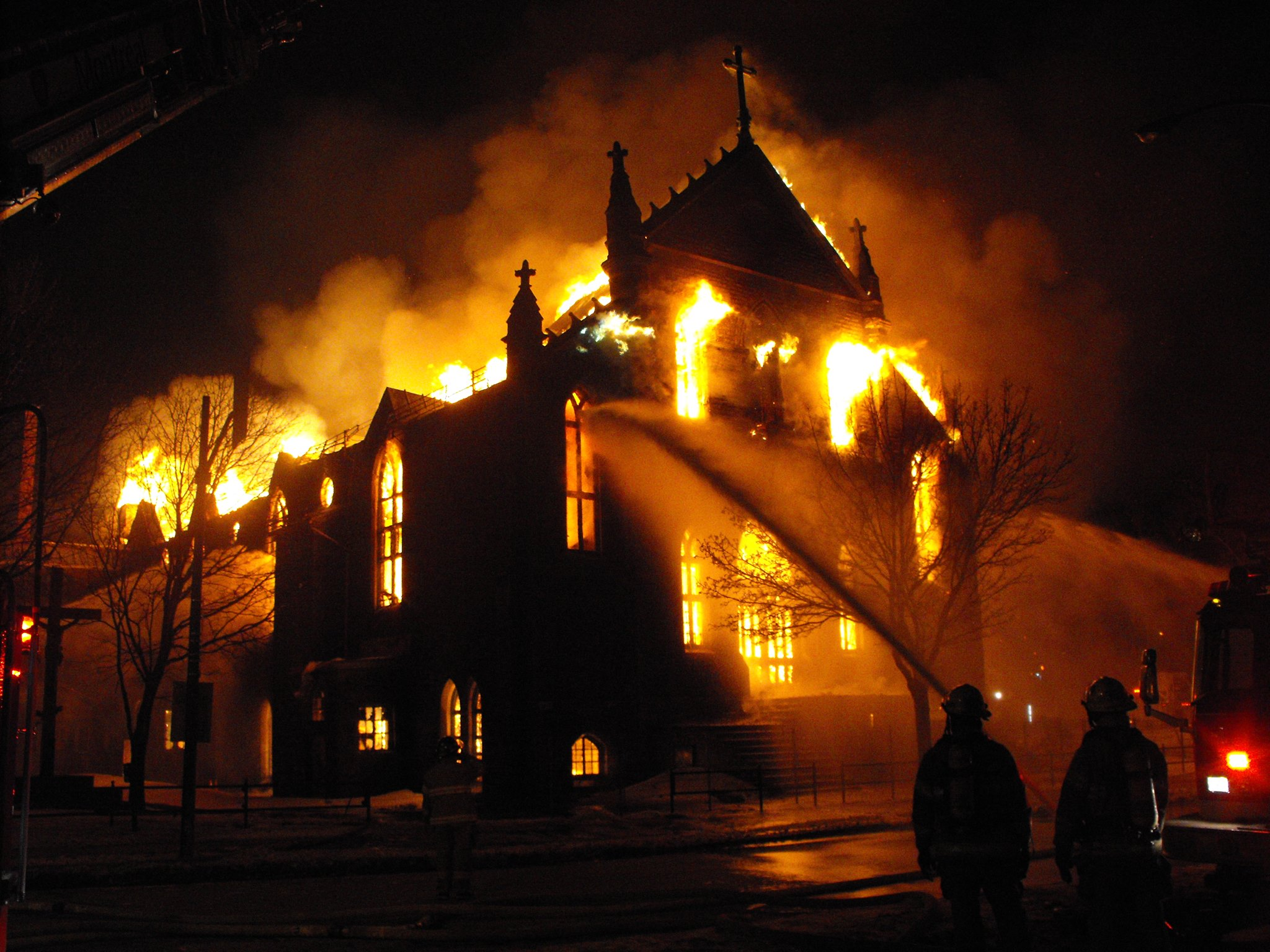
Montreal firefighters tackling a church on fire.

Each station is under the supervision of a Captain and several Lieutenants, who wear red helmets in the field. Field command is divided into six divisions. Each division is under the command of a Division Chief (chef de division). Each division is further divided into several districts, each commanded by an Operations Chief (chef aux opérations). Divisions 1-5 each have 12 stations. Division 6 has 7 stations.

In addition to fighting fires, SIM responds to numerous emergencies requiring specialized training and equipment. The four types of specialized teams are:

Hazardous materials - The hazardous materials team is trained to detect, control, limit and stabilize spills or leaks of dangerous materials.

Technical rescue teams - Heavy rescues are specialized in three types of rescue: confined spaces, structural collapse, excavation/trench rescue.

High-angle rescue - This team is utilized when victims cannot be evacuated without the use of climbing gear and where aerial ladders cannot reach.

Marine rescue (Sauvetage nautique) - This team performs water and ice rescue operations on Montreal's islands and in the surrounding St. Lawrence River.

SIM does not have a dedicated fire boat. The Sauvetage Nautique Team has small boats for near-shore and ice rescue operations:

- UMA17 - 5.18m (17ft) boats with sled-like hulls and an outboard motor used for ice rescue operations.
- RFV HammerHead (C20275QC) - This 6.7m (22ft) outboard driven is used as the primary rescue boat when waterways are ice-free. Built by Rosborough Boats, Nova Scotia.
- Rigid inflatable boats (RIBs) - Used for inland water rescue operations.

SIM may be assisted by the Canadian Coast Guard's Inland Rescue Boat Station at Montreal, which can provide rescue and some firefighting capabilities. In the Port of Montreal, private companies like Océan Remorquage Montréal operate tugboats that have firefighting capabilities.
