= De Vos =

De Vos is a Dutch-language surname meaning "the fox". In 2007 in the Netherlands, nearly all ≈11,000 people with the name spelled it de Vos, while in 2008 in Belgium, primarily in East Flanders, nearly all ≈11,000 people with the name capitalized it De Vos. Another 9220 people in Belgium, mostly in West Flanders have the concatenated form Devos, while in the United States the form DeVos can be found.

Notable people with the name include:

== de Vos ==
- Adam de Vos (born 1993), Canadian cyclist
- Anna-Marie de Vos (born 1960), South African lawyer and judge
- Asha de Vos, Sri Lankan marine biologist
- Charlotte De Vos (born 1983), Belgian field hockey player
- Cornelis de Vos (1584–1651), Flemish painter, draughtsman and art dealer, brother of Paul de Vos
- Dirk de Vos (disambiguation), multiple people
- Ernie de Vos (1941–2005), Dutch-born Canadian racing driver
- Frank de Vos (born 1956), Dutch sports sailor
- Geert De Vos (born 1981), Belgian dart player
- Hendrik de Vos (born 1969), South African cricketer
- Ingmar De Vos (born 1963), Belgian equestrian sports manager
- Jacob de Vos Willemsz (1774–1844), Dutch poet, art collector, illustrator
- Jan De Vos (disambiguation), multiple people
- Jason de Vos (born 1974), Canadian soccer player and commentator
- Judocus de Vos (1661–1734), Flemish weaver
- Justin de Vos (born 1998), Dutch footballer
- Lambert de Vos (fl 1563–1574), Flemish painter and illustrator
- Laurent de Vos (c.1533–1580), Flemish composer
- Lidewij de Vos (born 1997), Dutch politician
- Lu De Vos, philosopher
- Luc De Vos (born 1946), Belgian military historian
- Luc De Vos (1962–2014), Belgian rock musician and writer
- Maerten de Vos (1532–1603), Flemish painter
- Marc de Vos (1645–1717), Flemish sculptor
- Marie-Louise De Vos (born 1941), Belgian film actress
- Mark de Vos, South African linguist
- Miriam Phoebe de Vos (1912–2005), South African botanist
- Nathalie De Vos (born 1982), Belgian long-distance runner
- Niels de Vos (born 1967), British sports businessman and chief executive
- Paul de Vos (c.1592–1678), Flemish animal and still life painter, brother of Cornelis de Vos
- Paul De Vos (born 1950s), Belgian microbiologist
- Peter Jon de Vos (1938–2008), American ambassador
- Philip de Vos (born 1939), South African author
- Pierre de Vos (born 1963), South African constitutional law scholar
- Priscilla de Vos (born 1987), Dutch footballer
- Sander De Vos (born 1985), Flemish technology guru
- Simon de Vos (1603–1676), Flemish painter, draughtsman and art collector
- Tjakko de Vos (born 1956), Dutch ice hockey player
- Vincent De Vos (1829–1875), Belgian animal painter
- Willem de Vos (disambiguation), multiple people
- Willy de Vos (1880–1957), Dutch footballer
- Wim de Vos (born 1968), Dutch cyclo-cross racer

== De Vos van Steenwijk ==
- De Vos van Steenwijk, Dutch noble family
- Carel de Vos van Steenwijk (1759–1830), Dutch politician
- Jan Arend de Vos van Steenwijk (1746–1813), Dutch politician
- Jan Arend Godert de Vos van Steenwijk (1818–1905), Dutch politician
- Willem Lodewijk de Vos van Steenwijk (1859–1947), Dutch politician

== See also ==
- Reinaert de Vos, protagonist fox from the collection of fables known as Reynard
- Vos (surname), Dutch surname
