= Vos =

Vos or VOS may refer to:

== Language ==
- VOS, Verb–object–subject, in linguistic typology
- v.o.s. (Czech: veřejná obchodní společnost), a Czech company designator similar to Inc./LLP/LLC
- VOS (Latin: vinum optima signatum), a denominación de origen classification for sherries aged more than 20 years
- Vos (Spanish), a second person singular pronoun used in place of tú in some countries
- Vos, formal second person pronoun, see T–V distinction

== People ==
- Vos (surname), a Dutch surname meaning "fox", and a list of people with that name

== Media and entertainment ==
- Vintage Original Spec, a Gibson-branded method of relic'ing guitars
- Vos, a 2003 album by Leo García
- V.O.S (band), a South Korean boy band
- Vos (Danish band)
- Voice of the Strait, a Chinese radio station

== Science and technology ==
- Virtual Operating System, a type of Virtual Machine
  - Hitachi VOS, a mainframe computer operating system by Hitachi Data Systems
  - Stratus VOS, a fault-tolerant computer operating system developed by Stratus
- Virtual Object System, computer software primarily used for multiuser 3D virtual reality applications
- Veritas Operations Services, a web-based suite of services
- Voluntary observing ship program, a system for weather reporting from the ocean surface
- Volatile organic solvents

== See also ==
- Mirari Vos, a papal encyclical issued by Gregory XVI
