= Devos =

Devos is a concatenated form of the Dutch-language surname De Vos (meaning "the fox"), common in the Belgian province of West Flanders and French Flanders. DeVos is a version of "De Vos" found in the United States.

Notable people with the Devos or DeVos name include:

== Devos ==
- Betsy DeVos (born 1958) American politician and philanthropist, former U. S. Secretary of Education
- Danny Devos (born 1959), Belgian body and performance artist
- Emmanuelle Devos (born 1964), French actress
- Gérard Devos (1903–1972), Belgian footballer
- Hendrik Devos (born 1955), Belgian racing cyclist
- Jeanne Devos (born 1935), Belgian nun and missionary in India
- Katrien Devos, Belgian-born American plant geneticist
- Laurens Devos (born 2000), Belgian table tennis player
- Léon Devos (1896–1963), Belgian racing cyclist
- Léon Devos (1897–1974), Belgian painter
- Louis Devos (1926–2015), Belgian opera tenor and music director
- Paul Devos (1911–1981), Belgian chess master
- Philip-Michael Devos (born 1990), Canadian ice hockey player
- Raymond Devos (1922–2006), Belgian-French humorist
- Werner Devos (born 1957), Belgian racing cyclist
- William Devos (1857– aft. 1902), American businessman and Wisconsin politician

== DeVos ==
- Bob DeVos (born 1946), American jazz guitarist

== DeVos family ==
- Richard DeVos (1926–2018), American businessman, co-founder of Amway, and sports team owner; wife Helen DeVos (née Van Wesep, 1927–2017), American philanthropist
  - Dick DeVos (born 1955), American businessman who ran for Governor of Michigan, Richard DeVos' son; wife Betsy DeVos (née Prince, 1958), American businesswoman, former United States Secretary of Education, and Erik Prince's sister
  - Dan DeVos (born c. 1959), American businessman and sports executive, Richard DeVos' son
  - Doug DeVos (born 1964), American businessman, Amway President, Richard DeVos' son

== Named after Richard DeVos (1926-2018) ==
- DeVos Fieldhouse
- DeVos Place Convention Center
- Richard and Helen DeVos Foundation

== See also ==
- De Vos
- Davos, a Swiss municipality
  - Davos (disambiguation)
- Devo, an American band
- Devos the Devastator, a Marvel Comics character
