= Marie Louise De Meester =

- Born: April 8, 1857
- Died: October 10, 1928

Mother Marie Louise De Meester, M.C.R.S.A. (8 April 1857 – 10 October 1928), founded the Missionary Canonesses of St. Augustine in Mulagumudu, then British India. They are now known as the Missionary Sisters of the "Immaculati Cordis Mariae" or Missionary Sisters of the Immaculate Heart of Mary (I.C.M.), an international religious institute serving in the fields of social and pastoral work, technology and medicine.

== Life ==
=== Early life ===
De Meester was born in Roeselare, Belgium. As a teenager, she studied to become a teacher and proved to be a competent and kind teacher who was admired and respected by her students. She then decided to leave the school where she taught to be able to serve the poor. On May 4, 1881, she joined the Canonesses Regular of Ypres, Belgium, at the medieval Abbey of Notre Dame de la Nouvelle Plante, to fulfill her calling.

=== Missionary ===
In the 1880s the abbey received an appeal from a Catholic priest in the city of Mulagumudu, then in the British Raj, for help in administering an orphanage. De Meester felt that this was an opportunity to serve for which she had longed. With the permission of her superiors she left Belgium, accompanied only by an enthusiastic volunteer novice of the community, and set sail for India. The pair arrived there, only to find that the priest had died during their journey. Though she lacked the understanding and support of the local bishop, Mother Louise and her companion took charge of the orphanage and began to care for the children it housed.

To find support in their work, new members of the community were recruited, including local women. To allow for the formation of a sustainable community, De Meester saw that separation from Belgium was needed, otherwise candidates would have to travel to Europe for their religious formation as members of the Order. As a result, in 1897 she established a new religious institute called the Missionary Canonesses of St. Augustine.

=== Foundress ===
After establishing missions and schools in India, at the request of the Superior General of the Congregation of the Immaculate Heart of Mary (the Scheut Fathers), in 1910 Pope Pius X approved having the Missionary Canonesses work with the Belgian missionary priests in their work in the Philippines. De Meester enthusiastically set out for that nation, accompanied by three companions, Mother Marie Charles, Mother Marie Vincent, and Mother Marie Adeltrude, arriving in Manila on 10 June of that year. From there they traveled to the town of Tagudin, Ilocos Sur, arriving on 21 June, being warmly welcomed by the populace and led to their home in an abandoned friary in the town. They opened St. Augustine's School in the basement of the convent that following 4 July and began to teach, with 225 children enrolled the very first day. That enrollment rose to 300 within a month. De Meester shared the chores of the small community, teaching the children and caring for the house, as well as carrying out her responsibility for the young Congregation.

From that small start, the Missionary Canonesses founded what became Saint Theresa's College Manila at San Marcelino in 1915, soon followed by schools and colleges around the nation, including Saint Theresa's College of Quezon City, Saint Theresa's College of Baguio City, and Saint Theresa's College of Cebu City.

After the Philippines, foundations were established in China, the United States, the Belgian Congo. De Meester returned to Belgium in 1923 and in 1928 died in Heverlee (now part of the city of Leuven) at the age of 71.

== Legacy ==
In 1963 the Congregation formally associated itself with the Scheut Fathers for mutual help in spiritual matters as well as in missionary activities. They then changed the name of the congregation to Missionary Sisters of the "Immaculati Cordis Mariae" (I.C.M.) or Missionary Sisters of the Immaculate Heart of Mary.

Today the Missionary Sisters of the Immaculate Heart of Mary serve in Belgium, Brazil, Burundi, Cameroun, the Caribbean, Congo, Guatemala, Hong Kong, India, Italy, Mongolia, the Philippines, South Africa, Taiwan and the United States.

== Sources ==
- ICM history
