= Mark de Vos =

Academic background
- Education: Rhodes University (1996), University of Tromsø (2001), Leiden University (2005)
- Thesis: The Syntax of Pseudocoordination in English and Afrikaans
- Academic advisors: Tarald Taraldsen, Johan Rooryck, Sjef Barbiers

Academic work
- Discipline: Psycholinguistics, syntax, literacy
- Institutions: Rhodes University

Mark de Vos is Professor of Linguistics at Rhodes University. His primary research interests are in the area of Minimalist Syntactic Theory, specifically in areas of pseudo-coordination and agreement as well as Linguistic approaches to the Psycholinguistics of early reading in indigenous languages of South Africa.

== Education ==
Mark de Vos graduated with a Bachelor of Journalism Degree from Rhodes University (1996) after which he pursued his MPhil degree at the University of Tromsø. His masters thesis was entitled Afrikaans verb clusters. A functional-head Analysis and explores the hierarchy of functional heads between the IP and vP in Afrikaans.

He was supervised by Prof. Tarald Taraldsen. His Ph.D. studies (2005) were completed at Leiden University under the supervision of Prof. Johan Rooryck and Prof. Sjef Barbiers. His PhD thesis was titled The Syntax of Pseudocoordination in English and Afrikaans

In this Ph.D. thesis, he argues that English verbal pseudo-coordinative constructions are true coordinations at the level of the syntactic head. He then goes on to apply the same analysis to Afrikaans verbal pseudo-coordinative structures although the data play out in different ways owing to parametric variation in the languages concerned (e.g. verb second and Quirky Verb Second).

== Career and research ==
A body of his academic work explores the linearization of functional dependencies in Language. Broadly couched within the Minimalist Program, he develops the idea that phrase structure markers are partially ordered sets which, for reasons of computational parsimony and data structure need to be structured and ordered in a process known as Normalization. From these assumptions a range of core properties of Narrow Syntax can be deduced including a pathway to the evolution of Language in the species as a consequence of development of the lexicon.

Mark de Vos also explores the consequences of using Linguistic Functional Dependencies as inputs for Linearization as an alternative to Richard Kayne's Linear Correspondence Axiom. Whereas Kayne uses C-command relations as the input to Linearization, De Vos uses syntactic Functional Dependencies as the input where: If A functionally determines B then A precedes B. The nett effect of this is that selectors are spelled out as preceding dependents and categories with interpretable features are spelled out preceding categories with the uninterpretable counterparts. From this can be derived a number of properties of natural language syntax including the Head Movement Constraint.

Mark de Vos has also argued that linguists have an important role to play in explaining how early literacy develops, especially with respect to indigenous languages of South Africa. He argues that there is no single, simple path to reading literacy but that literacy acquisition is interdependent with orthography and the linguistic, morpho-syntactic and phonological properties of a language.

He is a member of the editorial board of Literator and was Chairperson of the Linguistics Society of Southern Africa (2014–2018). He was co-chair of the Southern African Linguistics and Applied Language Society (2018-2020).
