= Canoness =

Member of a religious community of women

A canoness is a member of a religious community of women, historically a stable community dedicated to the celebration of the Liturgy of the Hours in a particular church. The name corresponds to a canon, the male equivalent, and both roles share a common historical origin. As with the canons, there are two types: canonesses regular, who follow the Rule of St Augustine, and secular canonesses, who follow no monastic rule of life.

In the 21st century, the term has come to extend to women exercising the historically male role of canon in some Anglican context. Many female Anglican clerics however use the title canon and not canoness (see Male as norm), e.g., Sarah Foot.

== Background ==
The involvement of women in the work of the Church goes back to the earliest time, and their uniting together for community exercises was a natural development of religious worship. Many religious orders and congregations of men have related convents of nuns, following the same rules and constitutions, with many communities of canonesses taking the name and rule of life laid down for the congregations of regular canons.

== History ==
Saint Basil the Great in his rules addresses both men and women. Augustine of Hippo drew up the first general rule for such communities of women. It was written in the year 423 and was addressed to Felicitas, Superioress of the Monastery of Hippo, and to Rusticus, the priest whom Augustine had appointed to have charge of the nuns. In Ireland, Saint Patrick instituted canons regular, and Saint Bridget was the first of numberless canonesses. The monasteries of the Gilbertine Order were nearly always double, for men and women.

Towards the close of the 8th century, the title of canoness is found for the first time, and it was given to these communities of women who, while they professed a common life, yet did not carry out to its full extent the original Rule of St. Augustine. These canonesses were practically an imitation of the chapters of canons regular which had then recently been received through the introduction of the Regula vitæ communis of St. Chrodegang of Metz. The canonesses took but two vows, chastity and obedience. Their superiors were known as abbesses, often held princely rank and had feudal jurisdiction.

The occupations of the canonesses consisted in the recitation of the Divine Office, the care of the church vestments, and the education of the young, particularly the daughters of the nobility. The regular canonesses, for the most part, follow the Rule of St. Augustine, but local circumstances have been the means of introducing various changes in details.

Some communities of canonesses occupied themselves in the education of children, for example the Canonesses of the Congregation of Notre Dame (French: Congrégation de Notre-Dame de chanoinesses de Saint-Augustin), instituted in 1597 at Mattaincourt, in Lorraine, by St. Peter Fourier, C.R.S.A., and the Blessed Alix Le Clerc, C.N.D. This congregation, whose charism is the education of poor girls, spread rapidly in France and Italy. In France alone, until the persecution of 1907, they had some thirty communities and as many schools for externs and boarders. Driven from France, some took refuge in England, like those of the famous convent of Les Oiseaux, Paris, who moved to Westgate-on-Sea, and those of Versailles who settled in Hull.

== Development ==
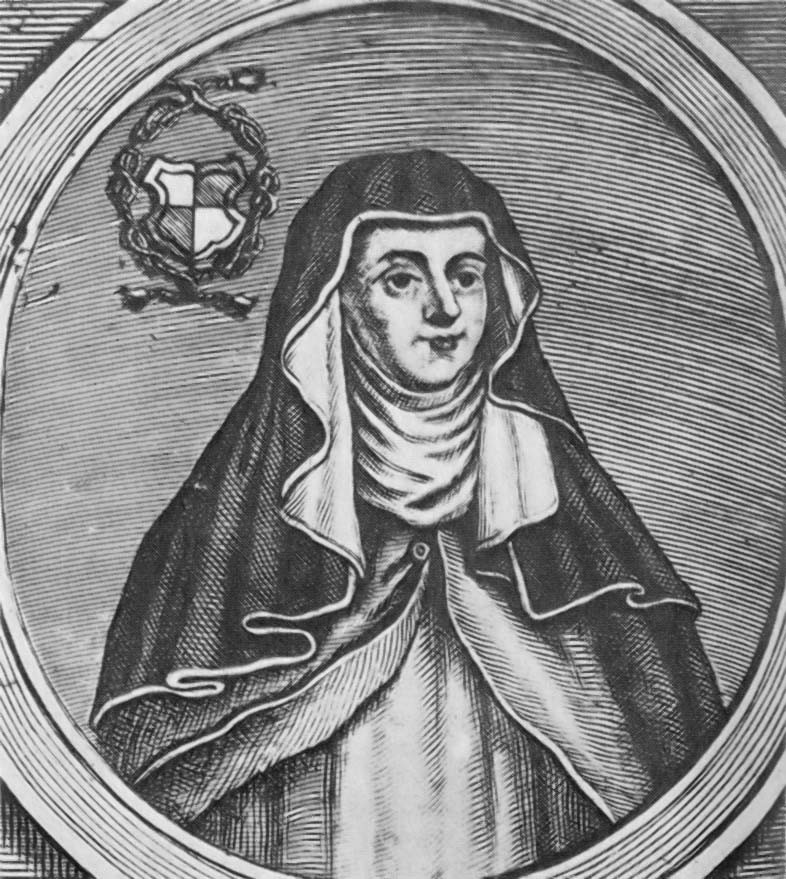
The canoness Hrotsvitha of Gandersheim

In many religious orders and congregations, communities of men and communities of women are related, following the same rules and constitutions. In the first centuries of the Church, the one generally began with the other. Most, if not all, of the congregations which go to form the canonical order had, or still have, a correlative congregation for women.

Some communities of canonesses developed unenclosed institutes of Religious Sisters to complement their activity. The Congregation of Notre Dame of Montreal, grew from the Canonesses of St. Augustine of the Congregation of Our Lady, with the same goal of free education for the poor.

In a similar manner, in 1897, the Canonesses of St. Augustine in Belgium answered the request of a missionary priest in Mulagumudu, India, for help with an orphanage he ran there. They sent several of their members to serve at this facility. Although they found, upon their arrival, that the priest had since died, they took on the care of the orphans he left behind. Not long after their arrival, and led by their Mother Superior, Mother Marie Louise De Meester, the Sisters went on to form an independent religious congregation called the Missionary Canonesses of St. Augustine, composed of many local Indian women as well as Europeans. In 1963, however, inspired by the Scheut Fathers with whom they frequently worked and from whom they received much spiritual support, the congregation chose to drop its monastic element, and transformed itself into the Missionary Sisters of the Immaculate Heart of Mary.

In England the Canonesses Regular of the Holy Sepulchre established a school at New Hall; although no longer ministering in the school, what they founded continues to flourish. At one time there was a community at Hoddesdon, devoted to the contemplative life and perpetual Eucharistic Adoration. This convent was a link with the pre-Reformation canonesses, through Sister Elizabeth Woodford, who was professed at Barnharm Priory, Buckinghamshire on 8 December 1519. When the convent was suppressed, in 1539, she went to the Low Countries and was received into the convent of canonesses regular at Saint Ursula's, Louvain. Numerous women followed and a separate English-speaking community was established. Towards the end of the eighteenth century, this community of English canonesses returned to England.

As with the canons so also among the canonesses, commitment to liturgical prayer, discipline and love of community life at first flourished but then languished, so that in the tenth and eleventh centuries several monasteries became secular and, though living in the same house, no longer observed the spirit of poverty or kept a common table.

=== Canoness regular ===
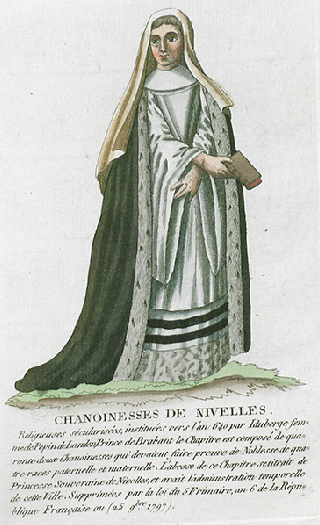
Noble Canoness of Nivelles in choir dress with ermine

There are canonesses regular as well as canons regular with the apostolic origin being common to both.

Communities of canonesses regular developed from the groups of women who took the name and the rule of life laid down for the various congregations of canons regular. They would take religious vows and, like the canons, followed the Rule of St. Augustine. They have the same obligation to the Divine Office as do the canons, and like them, the distinctive part of their religious habit is the white, linen rochet over the traditional black tunic. Again, like the canons, some congregations have simply replaced the rochet with a white tunic for their habit. Unlike nuns, whose communities generally followed the Rule of St. Benedict and supported themselves through farming, communities of canonesses would dedicate themselves entirely to various forms of social service, such as nursing or teaching.

=== Secular canoness ===
In medieval Europe, many communities arose where unmarried daughters and widows from among the nobility could withdraw to monasteries in which they lived pious lives of devotion, but did not become nuns. As they did not follow a monastic Rule (Latin: Regula), they were termed secular canonesses. Generally speaking, these monasteries were entirely composed of aristocrats. Unlike nuns, they took no permanent vows, and were not committed to a life of poverty, or to a common life for eating and sleeping. Essentially they provided a respectable, yet religious, way of life for those women who might not have been desirous of marriage at that stage in their lives, or simply wanted to focus on prayer in a manner befitting their station in life. In some examples they lived in their own houses, and most had servants available. They took no vows of perpetual celibacy (often excepting the abbess, as at Essen Abbey), and thus could leave at any time to marry, which happened not infrequently. An influx of Greek names at Essen suggests that after the death of the Empress Theophanu in 991, a Byzantine princess, her Greek ladies-in-waiting were retired en masse to Essen, where at this period the powerful abbesses were mostly women from the ruling Ottonian dynasty.

Where affected by the Protestant Reformation, these communities almost invariably accepted the new faith. Some continued to exist as communities of single women supported by the local rulers. Almost all had ceased to exist by the 20th century.

=== Notable canonesses ===
==== Secular canonesses ====
- Gerberga II, Abbess of Gandersheim (c. 940 – 1001)
- Hrotsvitha (c. 935–973), a German secular canoness known for her impact on literature and history
- Mathilde, Abbess of Essen
- Matilda of Ringelheim
- Matilda, Abbess of Quedlinburg (955–999)
- Adelaide I, Abbess of Quedlinburg (c. 973 – c. 1044)
- Sophia I, Abbess of Gandersheim

== Present day ==
In 2009, the Canonesses of the Mother of God were to be found at Gap in France, and are linked to the Canons at Lagrasse.

Further extant orders of canonesses include:

- The Canonesses Regular of the Holy Sepulchre, founded in the 14th century, were originally the female branch of the ancient religious order of that name, the Canons Regular of the Holy Sepulchre. As of A.D. 2011, there were monasteries of the Order in Belgium, Brazil, England, the Netherlands and Spain. The majority of the communities have ceased to wear a traditional religious habit, but their identifying insignia remains the double-barred Cross of the Order.
- The Canonesses of St Victor d'Ypres trace their foundation to William de Champeaux, founder of the Congregation of St Victor of Paris (Victorines), (1108). In 1236 the community was based in Roebrugge, in western Flanders (Belgium). They have since moved to nearby Ypres, where they operated a school. As of 2014 there are six canonesses based out of the Ypres house, which is affiliated with the Sisters Oblates of the Canonesses of Saint Victor in Champagne.
- The Augustinian Canonesses of the Mercy of Jesus have their roots in a group who, more than 700 years ago, began serving the needy and distressed in the expanding French fishing port of Dieppe. As of 2014, the community operates a nursing home in Cumbria, and in Liverpool.
- The Canonesses of St. Augustine of the Congregation of Our Lady were instituted in 1597 by Peter Fourier and Alix Le Clerc.
- The Canonesses de Windesheim-Saint Victor
- The Norbertine Canonesses

In 1997, a public association of the faithful, the Norbertine Association of St. Joseph, was established by the Canons Regular of Premontre of St. Michael's Norbertine Abbey in Orange, California. In 2000, the public association took up the common life in Tehachapi, California. In January 2011, the association was recognized as an autonomous priory of the Canonesses Regular of Premontre by the Holy See's Congregation for Institutes of Consecrated Life, the abbot-general and his council of the Norbertine Order and the Diocese of Fresno, California. One of two known communities of canonesses regular in the United States, they had grown from the original five foundresses to 49 sisters as of September, 2019.
