= Saint Theresa's College of Quezon City =

Roman Catholic school in Quezon City, Philippines

St. Theresa's College, Q.C.
- Dalubhasaang Sta. Theresa ng Lungsod Quezon (Filipino)
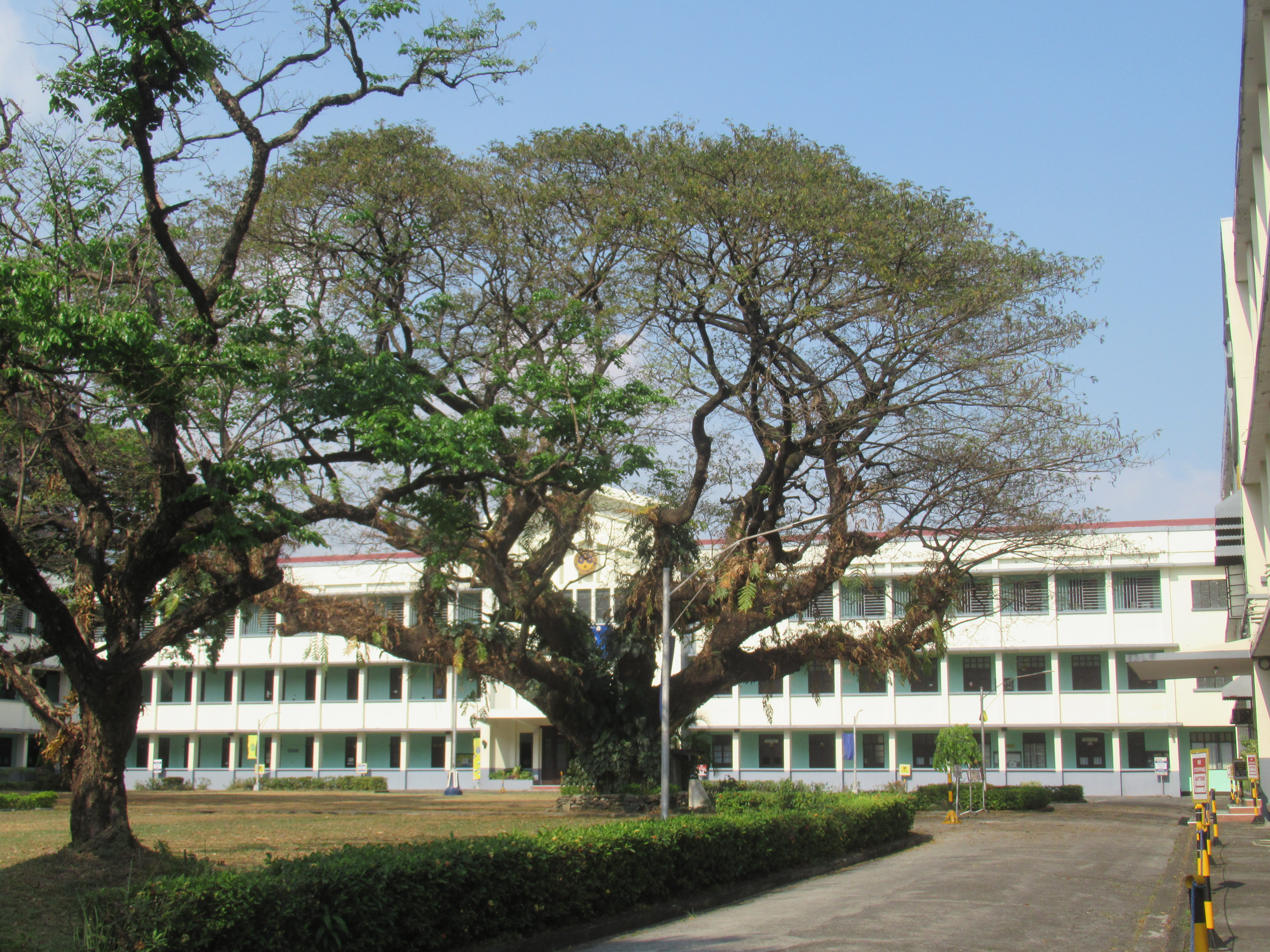
- Motto: Virtute, Scientia, Artibus Floreat (Latin)
- Motto in English: Education in and through Virtue, Science and Art
- Type: Private Catholic Non-profit Exclusive all-girls Basic education institution
- Established: 7 January 1947; 79 years ago
- Founders: Mo. Marie Louise de Meester, ICM
- Religious affiliation: Roman Catholic (ICM Sisters)
- Academic affiliations: CEAP PAASCU
- Directress: Dr. Maria Teresa C. Bayle
- Location: 116 D. Tuazon Street; Sta. Mesa Heights; Quezon City, Metro Manila, Philippines; 14°37′39.97″N 121°0′3.21″E
- Campus: Urban Sta. Mesa Heights, Quezon City
- Patroness: St. Teresa of Avila
- Basic education: K–12
- Colors: Blue and Gold
- Nickname: Theresian
- Website: stcqc.edu.ph
- Location in Metro Manila Location in Luzon Location in the Philippines

St. Theresa's College of Quezon City, also called by its acronym STC, is a private Catholic basic education institution for girls (formerly also a higher education institution) run by the Missionary Sisters of the Immaculate Heart of Mary in Quezon City, Metro Manila, Philippines. It was officially established on January 7, 1947, by the ICM Sisters but opened only in June 1947.

STC offers programs from the kindergarten through the elementary and secondary levels. As an ICM school, its educational program draws inspiration from Mother Marie Louise De Meester, Foundress of ICM.

Its students are called “Theresians”, from the name of its patroness St. Teresa of Avila.

Heading the school for the ICM sisters is Sr. Josefina Nebres, the former school directress. Now, Dr. Maria Bayle is the school directress after Sr. Nebres retired from her position.

The school is a member of the Catholic Educational Association of the Philippines (CEAP) and the Philippine Accrediting Association of Schools, Colleges, and Universities (PAASCU).

== History ==
Mother Marie Louise De Meester (born on April 8, 1857, in Roesalare, West Flanders, Belgium) and her novices arrived on the shores of Tagudin, Ilocos Sur on June 21, 1910. Tagudin became the base of the ICM missionary work throughout the Philippines which gave birth to institutions of learning in the country including the different campuses of St. Theresa's College. Mother Marie Louise De Meester founded St. Theresa's College Manila (STCM) in 1915 at the invitation of the Most Reverend Jeremiah James Harty, the first American Archbishop of Manila. World War II wrought havoc on the St. Theresa's College campus in San Marcelino, Manila, leaving it in ruins. The school was re-built and re-opened. It continued to be run by the Belgian Sisters until 1980 when the STCM property was sold to Adamson University.

In 1933, a sister school, St. Theresa's College of Cebu was established.

In January 1946, a contract was signed which turned over to the ICM sisters (Missionary Sisters of the Immaculate Heart of Mary), the property consisting of five blocks, in Sta. Mesa Heights, Quezon City. In accordance with the Philippines' law on properties held by the Catholic Church, it was tax free.

A rudimentary makeshift building used by the U.S. Army, which previously occupied the place, as a garrison to protect the area, was utilized temporarily for the classrooms of St. Theresa's College, Quezon City, and for the quarters of the ICM sisters. January 7, 1947, marked the establishment of STCQC. However, the school was officially opened in June 1947.

In 1957 St. Theresa's College Baguio City was opened, offering elementary and secondary education. It was one of the two all-girls school in the city. The other was Maryknoll College operated then by the Maryknoll Sisters.

In 1963, the Philippine Orthopedic Center was moved from Mandaluyong, Rizal, to occupy 1/4 of the original 5 block property of STCQC.

In 1972, the ICM Congregation launched a social orientation thrust for all its ministries in education and socio-pastoral, making St. Theresa’s College, Quezon City a pilot school for the implementation of this thrust. An ICM Sister was then commissioned to prepare a program for St. Theresa’s College, Quezon City which called for the school to make available the educational program to deserving families from the lower - middle income group by way of tuition discount, subsidized by Sambayan Educational Foundation, Inc. (SEFI), the funding arm.

In 1980, before STCM was phased out, a kindergarten level was opened to boys, by Sister Redempta Biltereyst, known to her students as Mother Redempta.

In May 2013, President Benigno Aquino III signed the Republic Act No. 10533, otherwise known as "Enhanced Basic Education Act of 2013" into law.

In June 2016 DepEd launched the senior high school (SHS) program nationwide, a new level of basic education consisting of grades 11 and 12 (K-12). Following this, STCQC launched its Senior High School program.

On March 8, 2024, STC sets its first historic football camp - first-ever women’s football team — The STC Golden Zebras.

== Institution ==
St. Theresa's College provides both academic, non-academic, and extra-curricular activities for their students' learning.

=== Grade School Department ===
The STC QC Grade School is an elementary school for girls. It has facilities and classrooms for students from Kindergarten to Grade 6.

==== Practicum ====
The practicum emphasizes experience-based learning. Theories are learned and applied to practical situations or vice versa, through observation, practice, workshops, team research, media demonstrations and educational trips.

==== Co-curricular activities ====
Students interested in Sciences, Arts and Writing are invited to join an organization for enthusiasts, called SINAG. In this organization, the students' talents and skills in a particular field are cultivated and developed. SINAG (or Socialized Instructional Activities for the Advanced Group) in Science, Mathematics, Performing Arts, and Creative-Writing helps students enhance their potentials in various subjects.

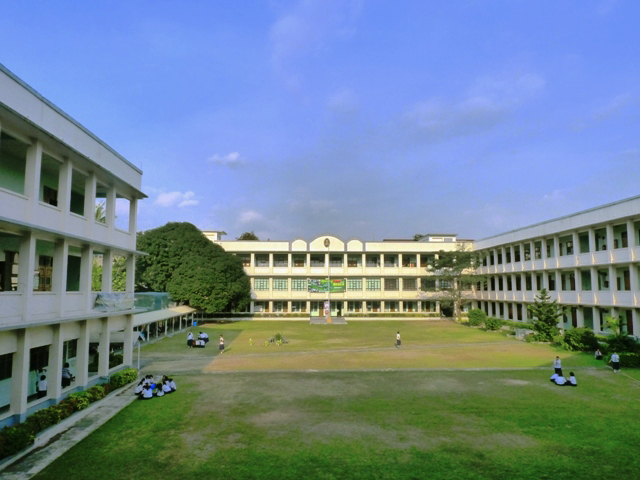
St. Theresa's College Quezon City High School Department

=== High School Department ===
The High School Department is a Catholic college-preparatory school for female students. The campus features a library, the Instructional Media Center, Biology laboratory, Chemistry laboratory, Physics laboratory, computer laboratories, High School Chapel, cooking rooms, sewing room, canteen and cafeteria, clinic and the covered court.

== School traditions ==
=== Seal ===
On a field of gold and blue are imposed the cross and three stars. The blue stands for faithful courage, and the gold proclaims jubilant victory - always - through love. The Latin cross within the seal stands for the victory with Christ over evil. The gold of the cross stands for the love for Christ who died on it and rose from the dead. The three stars stand for the three theological virtues: faith, hope, and charity.

The inscription around the seal reads Virtute, Scientia, Artibus Floreat - which is Latin for "education in and through virtue, science, and the arts."

The seal is a badge showing the mountain peak of Carmel, linked with the school's patron saint, St. Teresa of Avila, the first woman doctor of the Church.

=== STC Hymn ===
The lyrics of the STC Hymn was written by Aurea Carballo-Gonzalez (STCM HS '31, COL '34) while music was composed by Angeles Rodriguez (STCM HS '26, COL '33).

== Family Council ==
The Family Council is the official organization of the parents of the students of St. Theresa's College. They are the ones that organize the annual STC Family Day. The Family council celebrated their Golden Jubilee in 2011

== Sambayan Educational Foundation, Inc. ==
The Sambayan Educational Foundation, Inc. or SEFI was organized in 1972 by the Missionary Sisters of the Immaculate Heart of Mary (ICM) and a group of STCQC parents and alumnae which called forth the school to make available the educational program to deserving families from the lower-middle-income group by way of socialized tuition fee. Its main objective is to make available quality education for less privileged but deserving students.

The SEFI program is not a scholarship program. It is a reduced tuition fee scheme for twelve years of schooling from Grade 1 until Grade 12 for qualified lower-middle-income groups. It is perhaps the only such program in existence in the Philippines today. Applicants have to pass a rigorous set of criteria as well as entrance exams to qualify. Once a student has been accepted into the program, a social worker regularly monitors her progress and checks on the family environment.

The initial seed money was provided by the ICM congregation. STCQC parents, alumnae and friends have made substantial contributions to the fund through the years.

== Notable alumnae ==
- Aicelle Santos - singer, songwriter, actress
- Lydia B. Echauz - former President, Far Eastern University
- Marilou Diaz-Abaya - movie director
- Maxine Medina - designer, model, beauty pageant titleholder (Completed up to Grade 6 only)
- Dianne Medina - actress, dancer, television host, anchor and part-time model
- Mel Tiangco - newscaster
- Jessica Zafra - fiction writer, columnist
- Jessica Soho - newscaster
- Jing Castañeda - broadcast journalist, newscaster, host, & entrepreneur
- Rikki Mathay - former broadcast journalist, philanthropist, Senate Spokesperson
- Lisa Macuja-Elizalde - prima ballerina
- Margie Moran - Miss Universe 1973 winner
- Gemma Cruz-Araneta - Miss International 1964 winner; former Philippine Secretary of Tourism
- Leah Navarro - singer and socio-civic member
- Loida Nicolas-Lewis - philanthropist, lawyer (St. Theresa's College of Manila)
- Patricia Evangelista - writer, host
- Korina Sanchez - newscaster
- Jannelle So - journalist, broadcaster, TV host
- Yayo Aguila - actress
- Maggie de la Riva - film actress, former pageant beauty queen

== See also ==
- Saint Theresa's College of Cebu
- Christ the King College, San Fernando, La Union

== Sources ==
- http://www.stcqc.edu.ph
- Remembrance St. Theresa's College Manila 1915-1980, published by the STAA Manila, 1st edition 1991, 2nd edition 2004
- Esprit de Corps, published by St. Theresa's College Manila
