= Dirk de Vos =

Dirk de Vos may refer to:

- Dirk de Vos (cricketer)
- Dirk de Vos (art historian)
- Dirk de Vos (rugby union)
