= Vos (surname) =

Vos is a Dutch surname meaning "fox". With 30,279 people, it was the 15th most common surname in the Netherlands in 2007. Notable people with this name include:

- Aafje Looijenga-Vos (1928–2018), Dutch chemist and crystallographer
- Aart Vos (1905–1990), Dutch WWII resistance worker, husband of Johtje
- Albert Vos (1886–1949), Belgian sailor
- Amalberga Vos (fl. 1534–1572), Dutch abbess
- André Vos (born 1975), South African rugby player
- Arie Vos (born 1976), Dutch motorcycle racer
- Auguste Vos (1902–?), Belgian shot putter
- Chris Vos (born 1998), Dutch para-snowboarder
- Cor Vos (1948–2025), Dutch photographer
- Cornelis Johannes Vos (1768–1819), Dutch physician and politician
- Dave Vos (born 1983), Dutch football manager
- Dennis Vos (born 2001), Dutch footballer
- Edgar Vos (1931–2010), Dutch fashion designer
- Ella Vos, American pop singer-songwriter; stage name of Lauren Salamone
- Erik Vos (born 1929), Dutch stage director who founded theatre (group) De Appel
- Frans Vos (1925–2001), Dutch racing cyclist
- Freek Vos (born 1997), Dutch basketball player
- Geerhardus Vos (1862–1949), American Reformed theologian
- Geoffrey Vos (born 1955), British High Court judge, Master of the Rolls
- Gino Vos (born 1990), Dutch darts player
- Giny Vos (born 1959), Dutch visual and conceptual artist
- Harry Vos (1946–2010), Dutch footballer
- Hein Vos (1903–1972), Dutch Labour Party politician
- Hendrik Vos (died 1523), Flemish monk, one of the first two Lutheran martyrs
- Henk Vos (born 1968), Dutch football player and coach
- Hubert Vos (1855–1935), Dutch painter
- Ida Vos (1931–2006), Dutch author
- Ingmar Vos (born 1986), Dutch Decathlete
- James Vos, South African politician
- Jan Vos (disambiguation), multiple people
- Janneke Vos (born 1977), Dutch racing cyclist
- Jannie van Eyck-Vos (1936–2020), Dutch track and field athlete
- Johannes G. Vos (born 1949), Dutch-born Irish chemist
- Johtje Vos (1909–2007), Dutch WWII resistance worker, wife of Aart
- Lien Vos-van Gortel (1931–2023): Dutch liberal politician, mayor of Utrecht
- Maaike Vos (born 1985), Dutch short track speed skater
- Manuela Vos (born 1968), Dutch-born Spanish para-cyclist
- Maria Vos (1824–1906), Dutch still-life painter
- Marianne Vos (born 1987), Dutch cyclo-cross and road bicycle racer
- Marijke Vos (born 1957), Dutch politician
- Marik Vos-Lundh (1923–1994), Swedish costume and production designer
- Mark Vos (born 1983), Australian professional poker player
- Mei Li Vos (born 1970): Dutch politician, author and former trade unionist
- Michiel Vos (born 1970), Dutch-American journalist, lawyer and jurist
- Ralph Vos (born 1996), Dutch footballer
- Rich Vos (born 1957), American comedian
- Robbert Vos (born 1986), Dutch euphonium player and conductor
- Robin J. Vos (born 1968), American politician in Wisconsin
- Roelf Vos (1921–1992), Tasmanian businessman; founder of a supermarket chain
- Roosje Vos (1860–1932), Dutch trade unionist and women's rights activist
- Sander Vos (born 1967), Dutch film editor
- Silvano Vos (born 2005), Dutch footballer
- Suzanne Vos (contemporary), South African politician
- Tim P. Vos, American academic and professor
- Uli Vos (1946–2017), German field hockey player
- Willem Vos (born 1964), Dutch physicist
- Xandré Vos (born 1996), South African rugby player

Fictional characters

- Dryden Vos, in the Star Wars universe
- Jan Vos, in radio and television shows by Wim T. Schippers
- Quinlan Vos, in the Star Wars universe
- Vos, in Minecraft Story Mode Season 2

== See also ==
- De Vos
- Fox (surname)
- Fuchs (surname)
- Voss (surname)
- Joan Vohs (1927–2001), American model and actress
