= Afrikaans grammar =

Grammar of the Afrikaans language

This article describes the grammar of Afrikaans, a language in the Low Franconian family spoken primarily in South Africa and Namibia, which arose in the Dutch Cape Colony under the influence of various other languages and language groups.

The article discusses, among other things, the various synonyms for Afrikaans concepts, common language errors, spelling patterns, the compound and non-compound spelling of words and writing and punctuation marks. It also discusses abbreviations and acronyms, the different types of parts of speech that one finds in Afrikaans, gender, plural and diminutive as well as intensive word forms, loanwords and language concepts. The article also focuses on the different parts of speech found in the Afrikaans language, syntax and sentence analysis, gives an overview of literary terminology and finally focuses on figurative and rhetorical language and literary stylistic devices.

== Standardised Afrikaans ==
As is the case with many languages, there are regional spoken dialects of Afrikaans, but there is also a standardised written form. Standardised Afrikaans is the form used in dictionaries and most magazines and newspapers written in Afrikaans.

== Lexical categories ==
=== Adjectives ===
Adjectives describe nouns, e.g. die nuwe skool (the new school).

In Afrikaans, adjectives can be inflected, e.g. nuut vs nuwe (both 'new', but in predicative vs attributive form). They can also have degrees of comparison, e.g. nuut; nuwer en nuutste (new (determinative); newer (augmentative) and newest (superlative)). They can also sometimes have intensive forms, such as splinternuut (brand new). Intensive forms are always written as one word.

The adjective can be attributive, coming before the noun, e.g. die nuwe skool (the new school), or predicative, coming after the noun. e.g. die skool is nuut (the school is new).

Adjectives may, however, be inflected when they precede a noun. As a general rule, polysyllabic adjectives are normally inflected when used as attributive adjectives. Monosyllabic attributive adjectives may or may not be inflected, depending on the historical forms of the adjective. Inflected adjectives retain the ending "-e" and for some adjectives, word-final consonants that were lost in attributive uses are retained. For example, the final "t" following an /x/ sound that deleted in predicative uses in like reg (cf. Dutch recht), is retained when the adjective is inflected (regte). A similar phenomenon applies to the apocope of "t" after /s/. For example, the adjective vas becomes vaste when inflected. Conversely, adjectives ending in "-d" (pronounced /t/) or "-g" (pronounced /x/) following a long vowel or diphthong, lose the "-d" and "-g" when inflected. For example, look at the inflected form of:

Predicative	Gloss	Attributive	Notes
goed	good	goeie	
laag	low	lae	
hoog	high	hoë	(a diaeresis is used to mark a syllable break)

In some exceptional cases, after the syncope of the intervocalic consonant, there is also an additional apocope of the inflection marker. For example,

oud (old) – ou (when it precedes a noun)

Broadly speaking, the same morphological changes that apply to inflected adjectives also apply in the formation of the plural of nouns. For example, the plural of vraag (question) is vraë (questions).

=== Adverbs ===
Adverbs are used with the following:

- Verbs, e.g. Die kind werk hard. (The child works hard.)
- Adjectives, e.g. Die boek is besonder mooi. (The book is particularly beautiful.)
- Counting words: e.g Daar was ongeveer twintig deelnemers. (There were about twenty participants.)
- Other adverbs, e.g. Refentse sing besonder mooi. (Refentse sings particularly beautifully.)

=== Articles ===
No grammatical case distinction exists for nouns, adjectives and articles.

Definite Article(s)			Indefinite Article		
Gloss	Afrikaans	Dutch	Gloss	Afrikaans	Dutch
the	die	de/het	a(n)	ŉ	een/ŉ

=== Conjunctions ===
Conjunctions join words and sentences together, e.g. Hulle werk soggens en saans. (They work in the morning and in the evening. ) Dit is koud, want dit is winter. (It is cold, because it is winter.)

==== Types of conjunctions ====
1. Coordinating conjunctions connect sentences without changing the word order after the conjunction from a regular sentence, e.g. Hy is moeg, want hy leer hard. (He is tired, because he is studying hard.)
2. Subordinating conjunctions bring about a change in the word order after the conjunction, e.g. Sy rus, omdat sy moeg is (She is resting, because she is tired.)

=== Interjections ===
Interjections typically express feelings, e.g. Siestog, is jy siek? (Poor thing, are you sick?) Eina, jy trap op my voet! (Ouch, you are stepping on my foot!)

=== Nouns ===
Nouns can be used with "‘a" and "the" and can have plural and diminutive forms.

==== Classification ====
1. Proper noun is the name of a person or place or object and is written with a capital letter, e.g. Thuli, Pretoria.
2. Common nouns can be plural or sometimes have a gender.
3. Abstract nouns indicates concepts that cannot be touched, e.g. liefde (love), haat (hate).
4. Collective nouns: indicates a collection, e.g. 'n swerm voëls (a flock of birds) or 'n skool visse (a school of fish).
5. Uncountable nouns indicate something that cannot be counted, e.g. goud, sand, water, suiker (gold, sand, water, sugar).
6. Measuring nouns are used with nouns to indicate quantity, e.g. 'n emmer sand, 'n koppie melk (a bucket of sand, a cup of milk).

Nouns in Afrikaans have no inflectional case system, and do not have grammatical gender. However, there is a distinction between the singular and plural forms of nouns. The most common plural marker is the suffix "-e", but several common nouns form their plural instead by adding a final "-s". A number of common nouns have irregular plurals:

English	Afrikaans	Dutch
child, children	kind, kinders	kind, kinderen
woman, women	vrou, vroue (vrouens)	vrouw, vrouwen
shirt, shirts	hemp, hemde	hemd, hemden

=== Numbers ===
Afrikaans has both cardinal numbers denoting quantity and ordinal numerals denoting the position of an item in a sequence.

Cardinal numbers:

- Definite cardinal number: Daar was tweehonderd gaste. (There were two hundred guests.)
- Indefinite cardinal number: Daar was baie toeskouers. (There were many spectators.)

Ordinal numbers:

- Definite ordinal number: Die tweede klaskamer is gesluit. (The second classroom is locked.)
- Indefinite ordinal number: Die middelste vertrek is die personeelkamer. (The middle room is the staff room.)

=== Prepositions ===
Prepositions are used to express a relationship between things.

1. Free prepositions: These are freely interchangeable, e.g. Die kleuter sit op/onder/by/langs die stoel. (The toddler is sitting on/under/by/next to the chair.)
2. Fixed prepositions: Only certain words can be used in these fixed expressions, e.g. Die skelm is op heter daad betrap. (The crook was caught in the act.) Ek is besig met my werk. (lit. I am busy with my work.)

=== Pronouns ===
Pronouns can take the place of nouns.

1. Personal pronouns replace the noun. e.g. Hy (in plaas van die seun) doen sy werk. (He (instead of the boy) does his work.)
2. Dummy pronouns are often found with natural phenomena, e.g. Dit reën. (It is raining. ) Daar was eendag 'n liewe heksie. (There was once a dear little witch.)
3. Possessive pronouns indicate possession, e.g. Ek lees jou boek.(I am reading your book. ) Myne is weg. (Mine is gone.) (Also: syne, hare, ons s’n, hulle s’n, etc.)
4. Interrogative pronouns form questions: Wie is daar? (Who is there?) (Also: wat, waar, hoe, hoekom, waarom).
5. Relative pronouns further describe the noun, e.g. Die stoel waarop ek sit, is hard. (The chair on which I sit is hard.) (Also: waaruit, waarmee, waarin, wie se, wat.)
6. Indefinite pronouns do not refer to anyone or anything specific, e.g. Iemand het die deur gesluit. (Someone locked the door. (Also: niemand, almal, diegene).
7. Reciprocal pronouns indicate that the person or thing performing and undergoing the action is the same, e.g. Ek vererg my. (I get annoyed.) Hy skaam hom .(He feels embarrassed)
8. Reciprocal pronoun (only the word mekaar): Hulle help mekaar. (They help each other).

Remnants of the case distinction remain in the pronoun system. For example,

Personal pronouns
Subject pronouns			Object pronouns		
Afrikaans	Dutch	English	Afrikaans	Dutch	English
ek	ik	I	my	mĳ/me	me
jy/u	jĳ/u/gij (Note: Archaic/regional variant)	ye/you (SG)	jou/u	jou/u	you (SG)
hy/sy/dit	hĳ/zĳ/het	he/she/it	hom/haar/dit	hem/haar/het	him/her/it
ons	wĳ	we	ons	ons	us
julle	jullie/gij	you (PL)	julle	jullie	you (PL)
hulle	zĳ (Note: Note that hullie and zullie are used instead of zĳ (subject, third person plural) in several dialects of Dutch.)	they	hulle	hen	them

No case distinction is made for the plural pronouns. There is often no distinction between object and possessive pronouns when used before nouns. For example,

my – my, me
ons – our (the alternative form onse is now considered archaic)

An exception to the previous rule occurs in the third-person singular masculine and neuter forms, where Afrikaans clearly distinguishes between hom ("him") and sy ("his"). Similarly, the neuter pronoun dit ("it" as subject or object) is distinct from the possessive sy ("its"). Notably, the pronoun hy ("he") can also be emphatically applied to inanimate objects, much like the use of gendered language in English for instance, in the slogan of the Rooibaard hot sauce brand: "Hy brand mooi rooi" ("He burns beautifully red"), referring to the product's intense spiciness. For 3rd person plural pronouns, whereas hulle can also mean their, a variant hul is frequently used to mean "their" so as to differentiate between their and they/them. Similarly, julle when meaning your has a possessive variant jul.

=== Verbs ===
There are different kinds of verbs in Afrikaans.

Independent verbs/main verbs can stand alone in a sentence.

- With a transitive main verb, the action of the doer is transferred to the recipient, e.g. Sy doen haar werk. The word doen (do) is the transitive main verb here, because the action of doing is happening to the work. You can test this by asking who (for people) and what (for things) together with the subject and predicate, e.g. Wat doen sy? (What is she doing?) The answer is haar werk (her work) and that is the object in the sentence.
- With an intransitive main verb, there is no recipient of the action, e.g. Die kind werk hard. (The child works hard.) Hence, there is no recipient of the work action.

Particle verbs/separable verbs can be used as one word or separated in a sentence. E.g. unseparated verb: Jy moet opstaan. (You have to get up.) Separated: Jy staan vroeg op; (You get up early) or jy het vanoggend vroeg opgestaan (you got up early this morning.) (Note that the word in the past tense gets the –ge- between the two parts.)

Linking verbs cannot exist independently and are linked to a word or part of a sentence, e.g. Hy lyk vrolik. (He looks cheerful.) Sy is mooi. (She is beautiful.) More examples of inking verbs: is, was, word, lyk, blyk, skyn, klink, heet, bly, voel.

Auxiliary verbs cannot act alone in sentences, but must support the main verb.

1. Auxiliary time verb: het, e.g. Ek het my werk gedoen. (I have done my work.) (het = auxiliary verb; gedoen = main verb)
2. Auxiliary manner verb: kan, kon, wil, wou, sal, sou, moet, moes, mag (can, could, want to, would, would, would, would, must, must, might) e.g. Ek wil goed presteer. (I want to perform well.) (wil = auxiliary verb; presteer = main verb)
3. Auxiliary form verb: word, is (becomes, is) e.g. Die kind word gehelp. / Die kind is gehelp. (The child is / was helped.) This is a way to indicate the passive form.

There are only 3 main verb tenses (and a 4th that is sometimes used) in Afrikaans.

1. Present tense - When something is happening now, regularly or is a fact, e.g. Ons skryf toets. (We write a test.)
2. Past tense - For something that has already happened, e.g. Ons het vanoggend toets geskryf (We wrote a test this morning.)
3. Future tense - Used for something that has yet to happen, e.g. Ons gaan / sal môre toets skryf. (We are going to / will write a test tomorrow.) The present tense is often also used here, e.g. Ons skryf môre toets. (We are writing a test tomorrow.).
4. Historical present tense: The word toe is sometimes used with something that happened in the past, but the verb/s remain in the present tense, e.g. Toe ek gister daar aankom, staan die vreemde man voor my. (When I arrived yesterday, the strange man stood before me.) The simple past tense can also be used in this case.

==== Verb forms ====
- The infinitive verb form is used after the word te of om te e.g. Dis goed om genoeg te slaap. (It is good to sleep enough.) Jy hoef nie tuis te bly nie. (You do not have to stay home.)
- Demonstrative / indicative form: indicates an action in reality and is the usual way used in our times in the passive and active form, e.g. Ek eet 'n appel. 'n Appel word geëet. (I eat an apple. An apple is eaten.)
- Subjunctive: indicates a possibility, probability or wish, e.g. Sy sal seker nog kom. (She will probably still come.) As ek maar beter geluister het! (If only I had listened better!) Mag dit baie goed gaan! (May it go very well!)
- Imperative: indicates a request, desire or command, e.g. Was jou hande! (Wash your hands!)
- Interrogative: is indicated by a questioning sentence, e.g. Waarom is jy laat? Sal jy my help? (Why are you late? Will you help me?)

==== Other verb examples ====
There is no distinction for example between the infinitive and present forms of verbs, with the exception of these two verbs:

infinitive form	present indicative form	English
hê	het	have
wees	is	be

This phenomenon is somewhat akin to English verbs, since infinitives are mostly equivalent to verbs in the simple tense, except in English singular 3rd person forms, in which case an extra -s is added.

In addition, Afrikaans verbs do not conjugate differently depending on the subject. For example,

Afrikaans	Dutch	English
ek is	ik ben	I am
jy/u is	jĳ/u bent	you are (SG)
hy/sy/dit is	hĳ/zĳ/het is	he/she/it is
ons is	wĳ zĳn	we are
julle is	jullie zĳn	you are (PL)
hulle is	zĳ zĳn	they are

For most verbs, the preterite (e.g. I watched) has been completely replaced by the perfect (e.g. I have watched), or in storytelling by the present tense (i.e. the use of a historical present, which is sometimes also employed in Dutch). The only common exceptions to this are the modal verbs (see the following table) and the verb wees "be" (preterite form was).

Modal verbs
Present form			Preterite form		
Afrikaans	Dutch (3SG)	English	Afrikaans	Dutch (3SG)	English
kan	kan	can	kon	kon	could
sal	zal	shall (will)	sou	zou	should (would)
moet	moet	mote (must)	moes	moest	must (had to)
mag	mag	may	mog (arch.)	mocht	might (was allowed to)
wil	wil	will (want to)	wou	wilde / wou	would (wanted to)

The following four full verbs also have (rarely used) preterite forms:

Afrikaans		Dutch (3SG)		English
present	preterite	present	preterite	English
dink	dag / dog	denkt	dacht	think
het	had	heeft	had	have
weet	wis	weet	wist	know
word	werd	wordt	werd	become

Several verbs have irregular perfect forms which are used alongside regular forms, sometimes with different meanings:

Afrikaans			Dutch (3SG)		English
present	perfect		present	perfect	English
present	irregular	regular	present	perfect	English
baar	gebore	gebaar	baart	gebaard / geboren	bear, give birth
dink	dag(arch.)/dog	gedink	denkt	gedacht	think
oorly	oorlede	oorly	overlijdt	overleden	die
sterf	gestorwe (arch.)/gesterwe	gesterf	sterft	gestorven	die
trou	getroud	getrou	trouwt	getrouwd	marry

The verb baar (to bear, to give birth) has two past participles: gebaar and gebore. The former is used in the active voice ("she has borne") and the latter in the passive voice ("she was born"). This is akin to Dutch, in which the verb baren has the past participles gebaard and geboren, with a similar distinction. Compare also the distinction between English born and borne.

Modern Afrikaans also lacks a pluperfect (e.g. I had watched). Instead, the pluperfect, like the preterite, is expressed using the perfect.

The perfect is constructed with the auxiliary verb het + past participle, which—except for the verb hê (past participle gehad), separable verbs such as reghelp (past participle reggehelp) and verbs with beginnings such as "ver-" and "ont-" (verkoop, ontmoet are both infinitive and past participle)—is formed regularly by adding the prefix "ge-" to the verb's infinitive/present form. For example,

Ek breek – I break
Ek het dit gebreek – I broke it, I have broken it, I had broken it

An object is necessary in this case, otherwise it implies that the subject (ek) is broken.

The future tense is in turn indicated using the auxiliary "sal" + infinitive. For example,

Ek sal kom – I will come (or lit. I shall come)

The conditional is indicated by the preterite form "sou" + infinitive. For example,

Ek sou kom – I would come (lit. I should come)

Like other Germanic languages, Afrikaans also has an analytic passive voice that is formed in the present tense by using the auxiliary verb word (to become) + past participle, and, in the past tense, by using the auxiliary is + past participle. For example,

Dit word gemaak – It is being made
Dit is (Dis) gemaak – It is made, It was made, It has been made (so it already exists)

Formal written Afrikaans also admits the construction of was gemaak to indicate passive voice in the pluperfect, which in this case corresponds to had been made. The meaning of the sentence can change based on which auxiliary verb is used (is/was), e.g. is gemaak implies that something has been made and is still in existence today, whereas was gemaak implies that something had been made, but was destroyed or lost.

The present participle is normally formed with the suffix -ende (kom/komende), but sometimes it is irregular (wees/synde, hê/hebbende, sterf/sterwende, bly/blywende), although this is considered archaic for function verbs. Sometimes there is a spelling change to the root which does not affect the pronunciation (maak/makende, weet/wetende)

The verb wees uniquely has subjunctive forms, although they are seldom ever used in the present day: sy is the present subjunctive form, and ware is the past subjunctive form.

== Morphology ==
=== Morphemes ===
A morpheme is any of the smallest meaningful constituents within a linguistic expression and particularly within a word. Many words are themselves standalone morphemes, while other words contain multiple morphemes; in linguistic terminology, this is the distinction, respectively, between bound and free morphemes. The field of linguistic study dedicated to morphemes is called morphology.

==== Root ====
A root (also called root word, or radical) is the smallest part of a word that has independent meaning. It is the basic form of the word to which prefixes and suffixes can be added to form complexes.

==== Stem ====
Roots are composed of only one morpheme, but stems can be composed of more than one morpheme.

===== Types of stems in Afrikaans =====
- Derivational: the word consists of a base and at least one prefix or suffix, e.g. ongeluk (accident) (prefix on- + stem geluk); gelukkig (stem geluk + suffix -ig). It can also be formed by vowel change, e.g. berede (mounted) from ry (ride).
- Compound: consists of at least two stems without prefix or suffix, e.g. blomtuin (flower garden), voëlhok (bird cage).
- Inflected: consists of more than one stem and one or more suffixes, e.g. blomtuine (blom+tuin+e) (flower gardens); voëlhokkie (voël+hok+kie) (little bird cage).

==== Affixes ====
Affixes (prefixes and suffixes) only occur in compound words, e.g. heldedaad (heroic deed), kinderboek (children's' book). Affixes have no meaning value, but only serve to connect words.

Affixes in Afrikaans can:

- indicate gender, e.g. onderwyser → onderwyseres (male teacher → female teacher)
- indicate a feeling, e.g. bittere lyding (bitter suffering)
- change the part of speech, e.g. wapen → ontwapen (weapon → unarm)
- indicate a plural or diminutive, e.g. kinders (children), kindjie (little child)
- indicate degrees of comparison, e.g. swak → swakker → swakste (weak → weaker → weakest)
- form a profession name, e.g. arbeider (worker)
- have meaning

== Syntax ==
=== Punctuation ===
Diacritics form part of the word and punctuation marks are written between words.

==== Diacritics ====
Diacritical marks (or accents) used in Afrikaans are the diaeresis, hyphen, circumflex, apostrophe as well as other accent marks added to letters. Diacritics are used to indicate the pronunciation of certain letters.

===== Apostrophe =====
The apostrophe is used with plural forms and diminutives:

- that end in i, o and u, e.g. ma's (moms), foto'tjie (little photo), skadu's (shadows), Israeli's (Israelis) (but not if it is part of a diphthong, e.g. koeitjie (little cow), leeus (lions) or where words end in double vowels, such as komitees (committees)
- proper nouns that end in e and r's that are not pronounced e.g. Marais's, Du Plessis'tjie (surnames)
- plural forms and diminutives of abbreviations where the letters are pronounced separately (i.e. initialisms), e.g. BMW’s (BMWs), TV’s (TVs)
- of letters, e.g. a's (A's), m'e (M's), m'etjie (little M)
- of digits and numbers, e.g. 8's (8s), 21's (21s)
- it is used where sounds have been omitted, e.g., s'n instead of syne (his); g'n instead of geen (none)

===== Accent marks =====
- The acute accent (left downward stroke on top of letters) is only placed on vowels in Afrikaans words to emphasise the word, e.g. néé (NO), móét (MUST). It is only placed on the i if it is the only vowel, e.g. wíl (WILL), but not on the i in lúi (LAZY).
- The grave accent (right downward stroke on top of letters) is only used on four Afrikaans words, namely: nè , dè, hè (have) and appèl (appeal)
- Accent marks are placed on certain words of foreign origin, e.g. cliché, première, ampère, Adèle

===== Circumflex ◌̂ =====
In Afrikaans the circumflex (a cap or upwards arrow above a letter) is used on the vowels o, i, e and u:

- when the vowel occurs in an open syllable, the circumflex lengthens the sound, e.g. wêreld (world), lêer (file), môre (tomorrow)
- when e occurs in a closed syllable ending in a single consonant, e.g. skêr (scissors), miljoenêr (millionaire),sekondêr (secondary)

====== Diaeresis ◌̈ ======
The diaeresis (two dots above a letter) is used with:

- two or more vowels that belong to different syllables; here the punctuation mark indicates the beginning of the new syllable, e.g. "reën" = "re-en" (rain), "geëis" = "ge-eis" (demanded), "voëls" = "vo-els" (birds).
- words where confusion of pronunciation may occur, e.g. sosioëkonomies (or sosio-ekonomies) (socio-economic), koöperasie (or ko-operasie) (co-operation), mikroörganisme (or mikro-organisme) (micro-organism)
- loanwords with aër, e.g. aërodinamika (aerodynamics)
- plurals of words ending in ee, i, ie, oe or g after any vowel, and the plural ending in –e, e.g. "feë" (fairies), "knieë" (knees), "boë" (bows), "ploeë" (plows), "vlieë" (flies)

===== Hyphen =====
A hyphenated word is still one word in Afrikaans.

Hyphens are used:

- to make reading easier when vowels are clustered, e.g. "na-aap" (copying)
- with parts of words of foreign origin, e.g. hidro-elektries (also spelled hidroëlektries) (hydroelectric)
- where there may be ambiguity, e.g. bo-sluis (top sluice) versus bosluis (tick)
- with long compounds to make reading easier, e.g. ontwikkelingspelerspan-afrigting (development player team coaching)
- with compounds with numbers and symbols, abbreviations and acronyms, e.g. BTW-syfers (VAT figures), e-pos (e-mail)
- with repeated words, e.g. lag-lag (lit. laugh-laugh meaning easily), so-so (so-so)
- with word group compounds, e.g. klem-in-die-kaak (lockjaw disease), piet-my-vrou (name of a bird)
- when –hulle is connected to a noun, e.g. Thabo-hulle (Thabo and co'), ma-hulle (mom and co')
- where eks-, nie-, non-, and oud-(ex-, non-, non-, and old-) is used before a proper noun, e.g. oud-Matie (Stellenbosch University alumni) note that with oudleerder (ex pupil) there is notably no hyphen
- with certain proper nouns, e.g. Aliwal-Noord (Aliwal North), Pretoria-Oos (Pretoria East), Nieu-Seeland (New Zealand)
- compound ranks, e.g. generaal-majoor (general major)
- when omitting a part of a word, e.g. sokkerspelers en –afrigters (soccer players and coaches), Moot- en Vinkstraat (lit. Moot and Vinkstreet - not streets, because the word straat is repeated and not streets)

==== Punctuation marks ====
Punctuation marks make reading easier. Examples of punctuation marks used in Afrikaans are commas, periods / full stops, semicolons, quotation marks, exclamation marks, question marks, colons, parenthesis, and ellipsis.

===== Period / Full stop =====
The period is used at the end of a sentence and with abbreviations.

===== Comma =====
The comma is used:

- between two or more nouns, adjectives or verbs, e.g. Ek het penne, potlode, boeke, 'n liniaal en uitveër in my skooltas. (I have pens, pencils, books, a ruler and an eraser in my school bag.)
- between two verbs that form separate sentences, e.g. Nadat ons geëet het, het ons gerus. (After we ate, we rested.)
- before or after the name of the person addressed, e.g. Magda, waarom huil jy? (Magda, why are you crying?) Wanneer gaan jy huis toe, Ben? (When are you going home, Ben?)
- to indicate a parenthetical phrase such as an apposition, e.g. Mnr. De Wet, hoof van die skool, is baie dinamies. (Mr. De Wet, the head of the school, is very dynamic.)
- after an interjection with an exclamation mark at the end of the sentence, e.g. Sjoe, dis warm vandag! (Wow, it's hot today!)
- between rand and cent in monetary amounts, e.g. R99,99

===== Semicolon =====
The semicolon:

- sometimes replaces the conjunctions en, maar and want (and, but and because), e.g. Ek kan nie kom nie; ek is siek. (I can't come; I'm sick.)
- is used before the conjunctions dus, daarom, gevolglik, nogtans, tog, nietemin and inteendeel (thus, therefore, consequently, nonetheless, still, nevertheless and on the contrary), e.g. Hy het my diep teleurgestel; nogtans sal ek hom help. (He has deeply disappointed me; I will help him nonetheless.)

===== Colon =====
The colon is used:

- when a sequence of things is listed, e.g. Bring die volgende saam: jou swemklere, sonbrandmiddel, hoed, rugsak en gemaklike skoene. (Bring the following along: your swimsuit, sunscreen, hat, backpack and comfortable shoes.)
- before words quoted in direct speech, e.g. Hy sê: “Die busse vertrek 06:00.” (He says: “The buses leave at 06:00.”)
- before an explanation, e.g. Onthou altyd: onderwysers gee om vir jou. (Always remember: teachers care about you.)
- in time indications, e.g. 08:15
- in references to Bible verses, e.g. Psalm 23:6

===== Quotation marks =====
Quotation marks are used:

- at the beginning and end of quotations, e.g. “Dit is die maand Oktober/ die mooiste, mooiste maand.” (“It is the month of October/ the most beautiful, most beautiful month.”)
- in direct speech, e.g. Hy vra: “Hoe laat is dit?” (He asks: “What time is it?”)

===== Question mark =====
The question mark is used after a question, e.g. Waar is jy? (Where are you?)

===== Exclamation mark =====
The exclamation mark is used after commands, exclamations, wishes and warnings, e.g. As ek net vroeër begin leer het! (If I had just started studying earlier!) Pasop! (Watch out!)

===== Parentheses =====
Parentheses are used to add something to or into a sentence, e.g. Hy sal die tiende (Dinsdag) hier wees. (He will be here on the tenth (Tuesday).)

===== Dash =====
The dash is used as a stylistic device:

- before and after a remark that is inserted into the sentence, e.g. Hy sal – soos sy geaardheid is – betyds wees. (He will – as is his nature – be on time.)
- at the end of a statement in place of a colon, as well as the words naamlik (namely) and byvoorbeeld (for example), e.g. Drie leerders is vandag afwesig – Thuli, Agnes en Sarel. (Three learners are absent today – Thuli, Agnes and Sarel.)

===== Ellipsis =====
The ellipsis consists of only three dots and is used to emphasize something that is dramatic or indicates doubt, e.g. Ek moes nooit alleen gegaan het nie... (I should never have gone alone...)

=== Spelling patterns ===
There are four fundamental principles for Afrikaans spelling or reasons why words are spelled in a certain way:

1. Many words originate from Dutch and therefore it is traditional to spell certain words with v or f or with y (stemming from the 'ij' in Dutch) or ei, for example.
2. Afrikaans is written in Standardised Afrikaans. This is to facilitate understanding for all Afrikaans speakers, regardless of dialect.
3. Afrikaans is written down according to the principle of similarity. This means that words are not always written down as they sound. For example, even though the Afrikaans word for 'dog' sounds like hont, it is spelled hond, because of the plural, honde. The spelling of the singular and plural may not differ.
4. If you are in doubt whether to write a word as one word or two, it's safer to write it as one word. The golden rule in Afrikaans is: one concept, one word. E.g. artilleriekolom (artillery column), not artillerie kolom; rusperwiele (caterpillar wheels), not rusper wiele.

The single-letter vowels are a, e, i, o, u, and the consonants are all the other letters of the alphabet.

==== Diphthongs ====
A diphthong, also known as a gliding vowel or a vowel glide, is a combination of two adjacent vowel sounds within the same syllable. You can feel your mouth changing the sound: ou, oei, ooi, y, ei, eeu, oi, ui, ai, aai

Sounds that look like diphthongs, but are only vowels: ie, oe, eu. Your mouth does not change when you pronounce the sounds. Remember the rhyme; ' die toe deur ' (the closed door). They look like diphthongs, but are vowels.

==== Open and closed syllables ====
Open syllables end in a vowel or diphthong, e.g. dro-me (dreams), meeu-e (gulls).

Closed syllables end in a consonant, e.g. tuin (garden), skool (school).

=== Spelling rules ===
==== Vowels ====
- Long sounds in closed syllables are written double, such as in boom (tree), skool (school), muur (wall).
- Long sounds in open syllables (except for u such as skuuste) are written single, e.g. bome (trees), skole (schools), mure (walls).

==== Consonants ====
The consonant is doubled when:

- It is between a short stressed vowel and another vowel, such as manne (men), bakke (bowls), balle (balls).
- The base in the superlative case ends in –s, e.g. snaaksste (funniest);
- In compound words where one word ends in –s and the next word begins with –s, e.g. lappop (rag doll), gronddam (earthen dam).
- When words in –s get a derivation, e.g. adresseer (address), bypassend, (matching)

When a short vowel does not carry the main stress, it is not doubled, e.g., huwelike (marriages), heerlike, (delightful).

In words like seunskool (boys' school) and meisieskoen (girls' shoe), only one –s is written, because it is seun+skool and meisies+skoen.

==== The i- and ie-sounds ====
- Words that are loanwords from other languages get –i, e.g. idee (idea), tittel (title), but those that are not borrowed get –ie, such as mielie (corn), kierie (cane), biete (beets).

==== Alternate spelling ====
- There are some words that can be spelled in more than one way, such as pawiljoen and pavilion (pavilion); tsunami and tsoonami (tsunami).

=== Compound words ===
==== One concept = one word ====
Words that are one concept are written as one word in Afrikaans (unlike in English), e.g. Afrikaansonderwyser (Afrikaans teacher).

A hyphenated word also counts as one word.

Thus, compounds are written as one word, e.g.

- a noun + noun, e.g. skoolkind (school child)
- a noun + pronoun, e.g. pa-hulle (dad and them), Naledi-hulle (Naledi and them)
- a noun + preposition, e.g. stroomop (upstream), kopaf (head-down), bergop (up the mountain)
- a noun and verb, e.g. perdry (horse riding), asemskep (breath-taking)
- a noun + adjective, e.g. kiemvry (germ-free), vuurvas (fireproof)
- an adjective + adjective, e.g. donkergroen (dark green), stomverbaas (stunned beyond words)

More rules:

- Compounds with an abbreviation, symbol or number as the first part, are written with a hyphen, e.g. B-span (B-team), 2016-verkiesing (2016 election), R100-donasie (R100 donation).
- Proper names with compounds can be spelled in different ways, e.g. Klerksdorphospitaal, Klerksdorp-Hospitaal, Klerksdorp-hospitaal, or even Klerksdorp Hospitaal (Klerksdorp Hospital).
- Proper names with a number or symbol as the first part, get hyphenated, e.g. 4x4-Toyota
- Language names are written as one word, e.g. Standaardafrikaans (standardised Afrikaans), Praatafrikaans (spoken Afrikaans).
- Plant and animal names, e.g. geelslang (yellow snake), blouaap (blue monkey), witstinkhout (white stinkwood) are written as one word.
- Words with -eens, e.g. meteens (suddenly) are also written as one word
- Adverbs + toe, e.g. vorentoe (forward), agtertoe (backwards), boontoe (upwards) and ondertoe (downwards) are written as one word

=== Non-compound words (NOT written as one word) ===
- Compound language names where the first part is inflected, e.g. Kaapse Afrikaans (Cape Afrikaans)
- Word groups, e.g. op groot skaal (on a large scale), gevange neem (to capture)
- Compounds of adjectives and nouns, e.g. 'n blink plan (a brilliant plan), 'n groen rok (a green dress)
- Ordinal numbers in names, e.g. 3e Laan (3rd Lane) 33ste Straat (33rd Street)
- Number + the word al, (all) e.g. al twintig kinders (all twenty children).
- Compound of a noun + toe (to), e.g. huis toe (home - lit. home to), skool toe (to school), dorp toe (to town), Kaap toe (to the Cape)

=== Numbers ===
Numbers can be written in a number of different ways, compound or not: drie en twintig OR drie-en-twintig (twenty-three); twee duisend twee honderd OR tweeduisend tweehonderd (two thousand two hundred)

=== Word order ===
Afrikaans has a strict word order, described in many South African textbooks using the so-called "STOMPI rule". The name of the rule indicates the order in which the parts of a sentence should appear.

The "STOMPI" rule
S	v1	T	O	M	P	v2	I
Subject	First verb	Time	Object	Manner	Place	Second verb	Infinitive

Word order in Afrikaans follows broadly the same rules as in Dutch: in main clauses, the finite verb appears in "second position" (V2 word order), while subordinate clauses (e.g. content clauses and relative clauses) have subject–object–verb order, with the verb at (or near) the end of the clause.

Afrikaans	Dutch	English
Hy is siek.	Hĳ is ziek.	He is sick.
Ek weet dat hy siek is.	Ik weet dat hĳ ziek is.	I know that he is sick.

As in Dutch and German, infinitives and past participles appear in final position in main clauses, split from the corresponding auxiliary verb. For example,

Afrikaans: Hy het 'n huis gekoop.
Dutch: Hĳ heeft een huis gekocht.
English: He (has) bought a house.

Relative clauses usually begin with the pronoun "wat", used both for personal and non-personal antecedents. For example,

Afrikaans: Die man wat hier gebly het was ŉ Amerikaner.
Dutch: De man die hier bleef was een Amerikaan.
English: The man who stayed here was an American.

Alternatively, a relative clause may begin with a preposition + "wie" when referring to a personal antecedent, or an agglutination between "waar" and a preposition when referring to a non-personal antecedent.

=== Double negative ===
A particular feature of Afrikaans is its use of the double negative. For example,

Afrikaans: Hy kan nie Afrikaans praat nie. (lit. He can not Afrikaans speak not.)
Dutch: Hĳ kan geen Afrikaans spreken.
English: He cannot speak Afrikaans.

Both French and San origins have been suggested for double negation in Afrikaans. While double negation is still found in Low Franconian dialects in West Flanders and in some "isolated" villages in the centre of the Netherlands (i.e. Garderen), it takes a different form, which is not found in Afrikaans. The following is an example:

Afrikaans	Dutch	English
Ek wil dit nie doen nie.	Ik wil dit niet doen.	I do not want to do it.

^{*}Compare with "Ek wil nie dit doen nie", which changes the meaning to "I do not want to do this specific thing." Whereas "Ek wil dit nie doen nie" emphasises the unwillingness to act, "Ek wil nie dit doen nie" emphasises the unwillingness to do the specified action.

The double negative construction has been fully integrated into standard Afrikaans and its proper use follows a set of fairly complex rules as the examples below show:

Afrikaans	Dutch	English
Ek het nie geweet dat hy sou kom nie.	Ik heb niet geweten dat hij zou komen.^{1}	I did not know that he would be coming
Ek het geweet dat hy nie sou kom nie.	Ik heb geweten dat hĳ niet zou komen.²	I knew that he would not come.
Ek het nie geweet dat hy nie sou kom nie.	Ik heb niet geweten dat hĳ niet zou komen.³	I did not know that he would not come.
Hy sal nie kom nie, want hy is siek.	Hĳ zal niet komen, want hĳ is ziek.^{4}	He will not be coming because he is sick.
Dis (Dit is) nie so moeilik om Afrikaans te leer nie.	Het is niet zo moeilĳk om Afrikaans te leren.	It is not so difficult to learn Afrikaans.

The word het in Dutch does not correspond to het in Afrikaans. The het in Dutch means it in English. The Dutch word that corresponds to het in Afrikaans (in these cases) is heb.

Note that in these cases, most Dutch speakers would say instead:

No.	Dutch	English
1	Ik wist niet dat hĳ zou komen.	I knew not that he would come.
2	Ik wist dat hĳ niet zou komen.	I knew that he would not come.
3	Ik wist niet dat hĳ niet zou komen.	I knew not that he would not come.
4	Hĳ komt niet, want hĳ is ziek. (or more commonly Hĳ komt niet omdat hĳ ziek is.)	He does not come because he is sick.

A notable exception to this is the use of the negating grammar form that coincides with negating the English present participle. In this case there is only a single negation.

Afrikaans	English
Hy is in die hospitaal, maar hy eet nie. (lit. ...he eats not.)	He is in hospital, but he isn't eating.

Certain words in Afrikaans arise due to grammar. For example, moet nie, which literally means "must not", usually becomes moenie; although one does not have to write or say it like this, virtually all Afrikaans speakers will change the two words to moenie in the same way as do not shifts to don't in English.

== Linguistic concepts ==
=== Gender, plural and diminutive ===
==== Gender ====
In many cases, gendered words are less significant now, as, for example, a director can be of any gender — male or female. However, there are still some terms in Afrikaans where gender distinctions are maintained, such as:

- the feminine form gets a suffix, e.g. danseres (female dancer), vorstin (princess).
- The word differs for different genders, e.g. man – vrou (man – woman); seun – dogter (son – daughter); swaer – skoonsuster (brother-in-law – sister-in-law)
- The common word is also used, e.g. hoenderhaan – hoenderhen (cock – hen); leeumannetjie – leeuwyfie (male lion – female lion); bokram – bokooi. (goat ram – goat ewe).

==== Plural ====
Most plurals in Afrikaans are formed by adding –e or –s to the singular form. Examples:

- The –g is sometimes dropped, e.g. dag – dae (day – days) (but nag – nagte (night – nights)); maag – mae (stomach – stomachs)
- Words that end in stressed –ie are added with an ë, e.g. knie – knieë (knee – knees)
- Words ending in –f, get –we, e.g. hof – howe (court - courts); sif – siwwe (sieve - sieves)
- Words ending in –oog, get –oë, e.g. boog – boë (bow - bows); oog – oë (eye - eyes)
- Sometimes words can get –e OR –s in the plural, e.g. professor - professors OR professore (professor - professors); resep - reseppe OR resepte (recipe - recipes)
- Homonyms can have different endings depending on their meaning, –e or –s, e.g. hart - harte OR hartens (heart - hearts) (could mean either normal hearts or the playing card suite 'hearts'); motor - motors OR motore (car - cars OR engine - engines)(the word "motor" can mean car or engine in Afrikaans)
- Words ending in –heid get –hede, e.g. skoonheid – skoonhede (beauty - beauties)
- Words ending in –kus, can get –kusse OR –ci, e.g. medikus - medikusse OR medici (medical practitioner - medical practitioners)
- Words ending in –um, can get –ums or –ia, e.g. museum - museums OR musea (museum - museums); laboratorium - laboratoriums OR laboratoria (laboratory - laboratories)
- Words ending in –man, can get –ne or –lui, e.g. werksman – werkslui OR werksmanne (worker – workers)
- Measurement units such as SI symbols do not get plurals, e.g. twee meter materiaal (two meters of material)

==== Diminutives ====
Diminutives can be created in Afrikans in several ways:

- Words ending in –d or –t, get –jie, e.g. hondjie (doggie), paadjie (small road), saadjie (little seed), katjie (small cat)
- Words ending in a diphthong or –ie, get –tjie, e.g. ruitjie (little window), mandjietjie (tiny little basket), rusietjie (little quarrel), ooitjie (little ewe)
- In words with a short stressed vowel that ends in l, m, n and r, the consonant is doubled and the word gets –etjie, e.g. rammetjie (little ram), kannetjie (little can), karretjie (little car), balletjie (little ball)
- Words ending in –ng and a stressed vowel, get –tjie, e.g. ringetjie (little ring), dingetjie (little thing), leerlingetjie (little scholar), BUT
- Words ending in –ng in an unstressed syllable, get – kie and the –g is dropped, e.g. dorinkie (little thorn), koninkie (little king), piesankie (little banana), rekeninkie (little bill)
- Words ending in –m and preceded by a diphthong or long-pronounced vowel, get –pie, e.g. asempie (little breath), duimpie (little thumb), roompie (little cream), kostuumpie (little costume)
- Words ending in i, o, u and a stressed a, get ’tjie, e.g. foto’tjie (little photo), skadu’tjie (little shadow), mini’tjie (little mini), ma’tjie (little mom)
- Abbreviations, letters, symbols and numbers get ’tjie, ‘etjie, -‘ie, e.g. a’tjie (little A), m’etjie (little M), TV’tjie (little TV), 8’ie (little 8), 9’tjie (little 9)

=== Degrees of comparison ===
With most adjectives, the degrees of comparison are formed with the help of suffixes. The degrees are:

- the stellende trap (positive degree)
- the vergrotende trap (comparative degree) (gets –er) and
- the oortreffende trap (superlative degree) (gets –ste)

e.g. sag → sagter → sagste (soft → softer → softest); koud → kouer → koudste (cold → colder → coldest); mooi → mooier → mooiste (beautiful → more beautiful → most beautiful)

==== Other forms ====
- When the root ends in –s, the –s is doubled, e.g. los → losser → losste (loose → looser → loosest)
- When the root ends in –f, the comparative degree gets –w, e.g. dof → dowwer → dofste (dull → more dull → most dull)

==== Irregular examples ====
- Multi-syllable adjectives ending on –e, usually get meer (more) and mees (most), e.g. tevrede → meer tevrede → mees tevrede (satisfied → more satisfied → most satisfied); verlate → meer verlate → mees verlate (desolate → more desolate → most desolate)
- Some words can get –er and –ste, as well as –mer and mees.
- NOTE: Adjectives can NEVER get meer or mees together with –er and –ste, e.g. die mees interessantste is completely wrong.

=== Intensifiers ===
When a word is emphasised, an intensifier can be used. Intensifiers can be seen as grammatical expletives.

In Afrikaans the result is written as one word, e.g. bloedrooi (blood red), grasgroen (grass green), pikswart (pitch black).

Some words have more than one intensifier, but they don't have the same meaning, e.g. fyn (fine): ragfyn sydrade (delicate silk threads); haarfyn (deeglike) beplanning (hair-fine (thorough) planning); piekfyn uitgevat (looking amazing (in clothing)); papfyn perske (very fine peach).

Also helder (clear): glashelder rivier of argumente (crystal-clear river or arguments); kristalhelder water (crystal-clear water); klokhelder stem (bell-clear voice.)

=== Loanwords ===
All languages borrow words from other languages, which are then either used as is or slightly changed, as loanwords.

Afrikaans has borrowed many words from Dutch that we understand well; from the Khoi languages (e.g. karee (karee), dagga (marijuana), kwagga (quagga)); from Malay-Portuguese (bobotie (bobotie - a South African traditional dish), blatjang (chutney), piesang (banana), piering (saucer), spens (pantry)); from African languages (lobola (dowry), mamba (mamba - a type of snake), pasella (free)); from German (bank (bank), stoel (chair), poedel (poodle)); from French (garage (garage), restaurant (restaurant), plafon (ceiling)); from Latin (especially legal terms, such as modus operandi (mode of operation)); from Portuguese, Spanish, Italian, Persian, Greek and English: gholf (golf), trein (train), speaker (speaker), parlement (parliament).

=== Neologisms/new creations ===
Neologisms are words that are new to a language, often as a result of new technology, such as internet terms, e.g. e-pos (email).

=== Archaisms/old words ===
Archaic words are no longer commonly used, but still exist in older writings, such as the words for items of use from the past, e.g. Japons (archaic form of Japans (Japanese)).

=== Contamination ===
A contamination is when two expressions that mean almost the same thing are used as one word or expression, e.g. betref (concerning): aangaan and betref; in pleks van (in lieu of): in plaas van + in plek van.

=== Tautology ===
A tautology is the repetition of the same concept in one word, e.g. kabeltou (cable rope): kabel = tou; brokstuk (fragment): brok = stuk.

=== Pleonasm ===
A pleonasm is the repetition of the same concept in a phrase using different words e.g. dooie lyk (dead body), ronde sirkel (round circle). This is considered poor grammar.

=== Analogy ===
Analogies are used in the language for the formation of words after the example of words that are related, e.g. hondmak (dog-tame) is the intensifier for mak (tame), but the word hond (dog) is also used as an intensifier in many other words, which have nothing to do with a tame dog, e.g. hondmoeg (dog-tired), hondsiek (dog-sick).

=== Polysemy ===
Polysemy means that words sometimes have many meanings, but they still have something to do with each other. For instance, huis (house) can be the place where you live, it can be the church, it can be a royal house, or it can be used in an idiom, like die huis op horings neem (taking the house by the horns). Another example would be the word skool (school), which can mean place of instruction, building, you hate or like school, sports teams, etc.

=== Homonyms ===
Homomnyms are words that differ in meaning, but have the same pronunciation and spelling. For instance, a haas (hare) has two long ears and you have to haas (hurry) to be on time. Also: food is duur (expensive); something can also duur lang (take a long amount of time). The stove works with gas (gas); you are my gas (guest) today.

=== Homophones ===
Homophones are words that sound the same, but the spelling and meaning differ, e.g. something is as heavy as lood (lead); the twig has made a new loot (bud). More examples include verys/vereis (iced/required), vlei/vly (flatter/fly), vel/fel (skin/fierce), and vier/fier (four/celebrate).

=== Synonyms ===
A synonym is a word that means the same as another word, e.g. basis/grondslag (basis/grounds); pragtig/lieflik/mooi (beautiful/lovely/pretty).

=== Antonyms ===
An antonym is a word that means the opposite of another word, e.g. aanval/verdedig (attack/defend); mooi/lelik (pretty/ugly); vroeg/laat (early/late).

=== Paronyms ===
Paronyms are words that are derived from the same root, but the compound and meaning differ. These are also called stem-related words, e.g. We are bewoners (citizens) of the earth. They are inwoners (residents) of the home.

We are getrou (faithful) to our principles. We vertrou (trust) our parents to give us the best.

Reviewers give a kritiese (critical) judgment about movies. He is in a kritieke (critical) condition after the accident.

Doublets have two forms of the root word that do not have the same meaning, e.g. The old man smokes tabak (tobacco). You talk twak (nonesense).

The boom (handle) of the saucepan is uneven. The bodem (bottom) of the swimming pool is scabby.

We like to braai vleis (meat). His poor performance is a thorn in my vlees (flesh).

=== Abbreviations ===
Traditionally, periods are used with abbreviations. However, there are exceptions.

Some guidelines for abbreviations in Afrikaans:

- The first syllable, sometimes plus the first letter of the next syllable is used, e.g. Feb. or Febr.
- The first letter of the word, e.g. s. (sekonde - second) or sometimes the first and last letters, e.g. dt (debiet - debit)
- Word groups are abbreviated by using the initial letters of the words, e.g. d.w.s. (dit wil sê - that is to say); a.g.v. (as gevolg van - due to)
- Names of institutions or members are abbreviated by using the initial letters, e.g. LP (Lid van die Parlement - Member of Parliament)
- In abbreviations of names of degrees, diplomas and abbreviations that consist only of capital letters, periods are optional, e.g. MIV (HIV) or M.I.V (HIV).
- Only recognized abbreviations are acceptable in writing. You cannot simply use h/d for hierdie (this) or v/d for van die (of the) in writing.
- Abbreviations are not usually used at the beginning of sentences.
- Points are not used with SI symbols. They indicate distance, volume, measure and weight, e.g. 50 kg, 100 m, 130 km

=== Acronyms ===
An acronym is a type of abbreviation consisting of a phrase whose only pronounced elements are the initial letters or initial sounds of words inside that phrase.

In Afrikaans acrononyms can be written in uppercase or lowercase, e.g. VIGS or vigs (verworwe immuniteitsgebreksindroom - AIDS (acquired immune deficiency syndrome)); SARVU of Sarvu (Suid-Afrikaanse Rugbyvoetbalunie - South African Rugby Football Union).

== Synonyms for concepts ==
Many of the concepts you will learn in Afrikaans have synonyms. This will be indicated each time. This means you can use any one of the concepts:

=== Examples of synonyms for concepts ===
- Root word - stem, simplex, infinitive
- Prefix – premorpheme, prefix
- Suffix – postmorpheme, suffix
- Affix – prefix or suffix

== Grammatical errors ==
Grammatical errors can be found in advertisements every day. One of the most horrible is uitmis (to miss out on). This is often used in sentences such as: Moenie uitmis op die geleentheid nie. (From the English: Don't miss out on the opportunity.) A much better sentence would be: Moenie die geleentheid laat verbygaan nie. (Don't let the opportunity pass you by.)

Some more common grammatical errors:

- Australiërs live in Australia – NOT Australianers.
- Don't use Die mense wie jy moet bedank (lit. The people whom you should thank), but rather Die mense wat jy moet bedank. (lit. The people what you should thank.)
- Don't use Moet jou nie komkommer nie (Don't cucumber), but rather Moet jou nie bekommer nie. (Don't worry.)
- Don't use Kom saam my (Come with me) but rather Kom saam met my. (Come along with me.) (The error is due the English sentence: Come with me.)
- In written language only was is used for the past tense and not is gewees, was gewees or gewees het e.g. Hy was gister siek. (He was sick yesterday.)
- Time is usually written in military time and separated by a colon, e.g. 22:00 or 22h00.

== See also ==
- His genitive
