= Saint Theresa's College of Cebu =

Roman Catholic college in Cebu City, Philippines

St. Theresa's College of Cebu
- Dalubhasaang Sta. Theresa ng Cebu (Filipino)
- Training leaders for a better world
- Former name: St. Theresa's Academy of Cebu
- Motto: Virtute Scientia Artibus Floreat (Latin)
- Motto in English: Virtue, Science, and Art may flourish
- Type: Private Roman Catholic Non-profit Coeducational Basic and Higher education institution
- Established: 1 June 1933; 93 years ago
- Founder: Missionary Sisters of the Immaculate Heart of Mary
- Religious affiliation: Roman Catholic (ICM Sisters)
- Academic affiliations: PAASCU; CEAP
- Directress: Sr. Maria Cora P. Sastre, ICM
- Location: 21 Juana Osmeña St., Camputhaw, Cebu City, Cebu, Philippines; 10°18′42″N 123°53′46″E
- Campus: Urban Juana Osmeña St., Cebu City
- Patron saint: St. Theresa of Avila
- Colors: Blue and Gold
- Nickname: Theresian
- Website: www.stccebu.edu.ph
- Location in the Visayas Location in the Philippines

St. Theresa's College of Cebu (STC), is a private Catholic institution of basic and higher learning run by the sisters of the Immaculate Heart of Mary in Cebu City, Philippines. It was founded by the Immaculate heart of Mary sisters on June 1, 1933 upon the invitation of Monsignor Gabriel Reyes, then Archbishop of Cebu.

The institution offers all levels of instruction for boys and girls from preschool to Grade 6, for girls exclusively in junior high school (grades 7-10), and for men and women in senior high school (grades 11 & 12).

== About STC ==
=== History ===
St. Theresa's College of Cebu (formerly known as St. Theresa's Academy of Cebu), was founded by the Missionary Sisters of St. Augustine of Cebu (now the Missionary Sisters of the Immaculate Heart of Mary) on June 1, 1933 upon the expressed invitation of Msgr. Gabriel Reyes (then the Archbishop of Cebu).

The institution first operated in Sikatuna Street, Cebu City, while school buildings were being erected on its present site, bounded by General Maxilom Avenue (Mango Avenue), Juana Osmeña Street, Redemptorist Road, and Ramon Aboitiz Street (Elizabeth Pond Street).

In 1935, the college department was opened. Liberal Arts, Education, and Commerce undergraduate courses were offered. These three courses were fully recognized by the Bureau of Education in 1940.

After the outbreak of World War II in 1941, only the primary grades were reopened in 1945 as all the school buildings were destroyed by fire and bombs. The following year, high school classes were resumed in temporary shacks. The buildings were rebuilt from 1946 to 1955. The latest additions were built in 1960 and 1965.

In 1957, St. Theresa's College of Cebu became a Charter Member of the Philippine Accrediting Association of Schools, Colleges, and Universities (PAASCU) and has satisfactorily maintained its accredited status. St. Theresa's College, High School Department was accredited in 1970 and reaccredited in 1973, 1979, 1985, 1991, 1995, and 2005.

It is also a member of the Catholic Educational Association of the Philippines (CEAP).

In 2008, St. Theresa's College celebrated its Diamond Jubilee Year.

=== Patron Saint ===
Teresa de Avila, the first woman doctor of the Church, is the patron saint of St. Theresa’s College.

=== Incorporation ===
St. Theresa's College of Cebu, was originally incorporated in accordance with Philippine Laws on March 29, 1935. After World War II, the Articles of Incorporation were duly reconstituted and with the Securities and Exchange Commission, Manila, October 1948. The transcript of these amended Articles of Incorporation was issued on September 8, 1949. In February 1991, the papers of Incorporation registered at the Securities and Exchange Commission were revised.

Until August 1991 the members of the Board of Trustees of St. Theresa's College Cebu were the ICM District Superior and her Council. As of 2016, St. Theresa's College Cebu is governed by a separate Board of Trustees with ten members, six of whom are ICMs and four non-ICMs.

== Academic programs ==
=== Basic Education ===
- Kindergarten to Grade 12

=== College ===
==== Liberal Arts ====
- Bachelor of Arts in Communication
  - Major in Corporate Communication
  - Major in Media Communication
- Bachelor of Arts in Psychology
- Bachelor of Science in Psychology
  - Major in Counseling Psychology
  - Major in Industrial Psychology

==== Education ====
- Bachelor of Secondary Education
  - Major in English
  - Major in Mathematics
- Bachelor of Elementary Education
  - General Education
  - Pre-School Education
  - Special Needs Education

==== Social Work ====
- Bachelor of Science in Social Work

==== Management and Accountancy ====
- Bachelor of Science in Accountancy
- Bachelor of Science in Business Administration
  - Major in Entrepreneurial Management
  - Major in Financial Management
  - Major in Marketing Management

==== Diploma Courses ====
- Certificate Course in Community Development

The course is designed to aid aspiring community organizers to gain basic knowledge and understanding of community development work. The course provides both theory and practice.

- Diploma in Professional Education

This is designed for students who wish to take the Licensure Examination for Teachers in the Pre-School, Elementary, and Secondary Levels, but whose educational qualifications are not those degrees expressly prescribed in the law. This program provides the student the opportunity to pursue teacher education.

- Diploma in Teaching Special Education

== Notable alumni ==
- Daisy Ba-ad – playwright, stage director, composer, motivational speaker and life coach
- Gwendolyn Garcia – politician
- Ellen Adarna – actress, model, socialite
- Gwendolyn Ecleo – politician
- Emmarie "Lolypop" Ouano-Dizon - political figure
- Laurice Guillen – director, actress
- Anna Maris Igpit – beauty pageant titleholder
- Monique Lhuillier – Filipino fashion designer based in the United States
- Cecilia Manguerra Brainard – novelist
- Deanna Wong – Volleyball Player

== See also ==
- Saint Theresa's College of Quezon City
- Christ the King College, San Fernando, La Union
