= Johtje and Aart Vos =

Dutch humanitarians during the Nazi era

Johtje and Aart Vos, a Dutch married couple, were members of the Dutch Resistance during World War II. They saved 36 lives during the war by hiding Jews in their home.

== Early years ==
Johtje Vos was born Johanna Kuyper on 29 December 1909 in Amersfoort, Netherlands. The Voses were married in 1942; they had five children.

== World War II ==
The Voses began their resistance work when the Germans forced their Jewish friends to move into the Jewish quarter of Amsterdam. One friend asked the Voses to hide a Jewish child and a piano from the Germans. The Voses agreed. Another friend asked them to hide a suitcase full of valuables. Once again, the Voses agreed.

Before long, the couple joined the Laren Resistance Group. The Voses agreed to use their home as a hiding space for Jews. The Voses lived on a dead-end street, backing up to the woods, making transporting individuals discreetly an easier task. Aart constructed a 55 yard tunnel from their house to the woods. Johtje oversaw the household matters and tended to the refugees. Aart supplied food for the refugees and communicated with the larger Resistance community.

Jews seeking refuge at the Vos house were required to bring special identification paper work. In one instance, Johtje turned away a man begging for asylum because he failed to produce these identification. The Voses later discovered that he was a German informant.

On one occasion, the Gestapo arrested a member of the Laren group. In response, the Voses retrieved contraband from his home and buried it in their back yard. Soon afterwards, the Gestapo arrived at the Vos house with the resistance member, bloodied from torture . The Gestapo officers told the Voses to return the contraband or they would execute the prisoner.

Johtje devised a plan to save him. He sent the man's wife to dig up the contraband and bring it to the Gestapo, telling them she found it at her brother-in-law's house (who was safe in hiding). The Gestapo released the prisoner.

== Legacy ==
During the German occupation of the Netherlands, the Voses saved a total of 36 lives.

After the war, the Voses was honored with the Righteous Among the Nations award. They tried to adopt a young girl they had sheltered, but the Jewish community, anxious to preserve her Jewish identity, send her instead to an orphanage.

Johtje was interviewed for Gay Block and Malka Drucker's book Rescuers: Portraits of Moral Courage in the Holocaust which was released in 1992. Vos, in this interview, disagreed with the characterization of the couple's actions as heroic: “I want to say right away that the words ‘hero’ and ‘righteous gentile’ are terribly misplaced.” In 1999, Johtje Vos wrote a memoir about their experiences titled The End of the Tunnel.

Aart Vos died in 1990, Johtja Vos on 10 October 2007. The couple is survived by fifteen grandchildren and fifteen great-grandchildren.

In 1998, Paramount Global produced the TV drama series "Stories of Courage: Two Couples" which reproduced the historical story of this couple who rescued the Jewish people.
