= Willy de Vos =

Dutch footballer

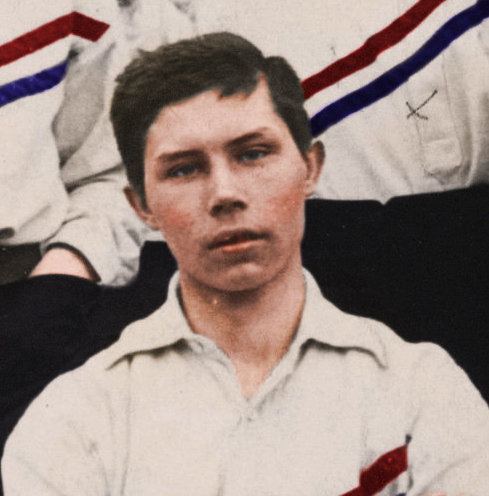
- De Vos (1905)

Personal information
- Full name: Willem Hendrik de Vos
- Date of birth: 26 January 1880
- Place of birth: Geervliet, Netherlands
- Date of death: 15 July 1957 (aged 77)

Senior career*
Years	Team	Apps	(Gls)
- DFC

International career
1905	Netherlands	2	(0)
- * Club domestic league appearances and goals

Willem Hendrik "Willy" de Vos (26 January 1880 – 15 July 1957) was a Dutch footballer who played in the Netherlands' first ever international match on 30 April 1905. De Vos, who played club football for DFC, made a total of two appearances for the national side in 1905.
