= Johan Rooryck =

Belgian linguist

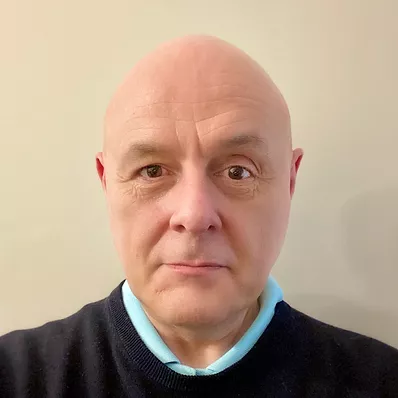
- Born: 1 July 1961 (age 65); Leuven
- Awards: Distinguished Lorentz Fellowship (2011/2012)

Academic background
- Education: KU Leuven (BA, MA, PhD)
- Thesis: Control verbs: an analysis of the interpretation of the non-expressed subject of infinitival constructions in French (1987)

Academic work
- Discipline: linguistics
- Sub-discipline: syntax, morphology
- Institutions: Leiden University
- Website: www.rooryck.org

Johan Rooryck (born 1 July 1961) is a Belgian linguist and a visiting professor at Leiden University where he was Professor of French Linguistics between 1993 and 2020. He is co-editor-in-chief of the journal Glossa and the former executive editor of Lingua (1999-2015). Rooryck is known for his works on generative grammar. He is the executive director of cOAlition S and is a recipient of Distinguished Lorentz Fellowship (2011/2012).

== Books ==
- Dissolving Binding Theory, with Guido Vanden Wyngaerd, Oxford University Press 2011
- Configurations of Sentential Complementation: Perspectives from Romance Languages, Routledge 2011
- Romance Languages and Linguistic Theory 1999, edited with Yves D’Hulst and Jan Schroten, John Benjamins Publishing Company 2001
- Quitte ou Double Sens: Articles sur l'Ambiguïté offerts à Ronald Landheer, edited with Paul J. Smith and Paul Bogaards, Brill Rodopi 2001
- Phrase Structure and the Lexicon, edited with Laurie Zaring, Springer 1996
