= Dirk de Vos (cricketer) =

South African cricketer (born 1975)

Dirk Johannes Jacobus De Vos
Personal information
- Born: 15 June 1975 (age 51); Pretoria, South Africa
- Batting: Right-handed
- Bowling: Right-arm off-break
- Role: Wicketkeeper
- Relatives: Hendrik de Vos (brother)
- Source: Cricinfo, 26 May 2018

Dirk Johannes Jacobus de Vos (born 15 June 1975) is a former South African cricketer. He played first-class and List A cricket in South Africa from 1992 to 2004.
