= Superlative case =

Grammatical case

In grammar, nouns in the superlative case (abbreviated supl or more ambiguously sup) typically denote objects over which or onto the top of which another object moves (movement over or onto the top of is important here).

In English, similar meanings are expressed by nouns following the prepositions on top of and over preceded by a verb of motion:

- I threw the ball on top of the house. Used in Northeast Caucasian languages such as Tsez, Bezhta and Hinuq.
