= Jeanne Devos =

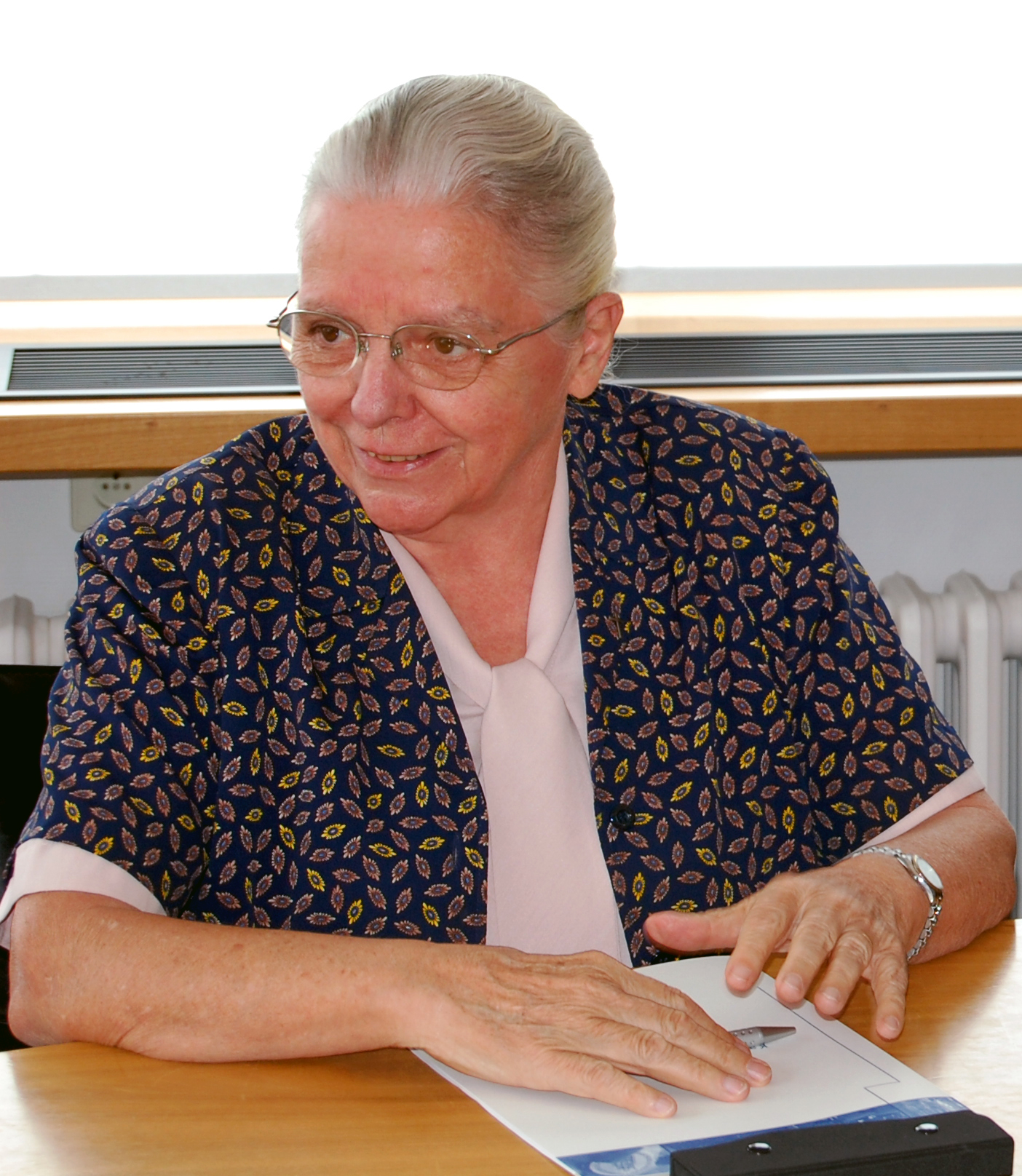
Sr. Jeanne Devos in 2007

Jeanne Devos, ICM, (born 1935) is a Belgian religious sister and missionary who has spent her adult life serving the neediest people in India. She founded the National Domestic Workers Movement to advocate for one of the most powerless segments of society. For her work, she has been nominated for the Nobel Peace Prize.

== Life ==
Devos was born in 1935 in Kortenaken, a village in the Province of Flemish Brabant. She attended the Heilig Hartinstituut in Heverlee, run by the Apostolic Sisters of the Annunciation, an active congregation of the Order of the Annunciation of the Blessed Virgin Mary, an enclosed religious order.

As a teenager, Devos became introduced to the writings of Mahatma Gandhi and Rabindranath Tagore, from which she felt called to serve God in India. To follow this dream, in 1960 Devos entered the congregation of the Missionary Sisters of the Immaculate Heart of Mary which had been founded in India by 1897, and whose motherhouse was located in Heverlee at that time. After completing the novitiate, in order to prepare for service in the missions, Devos was sent to be trained as a speech therapist. In 1965 she was sent to the missions of the congregation in Bombay, India. In 1966 Sr. Jeanne founded a student’s movement (YCS/YSM) with the aim of linking students to the underprivileged. http://www.ycsysmindia.com/

== Domestic workers ==
In 1978 a survey was conducted by the Catholic Bishops Conference of India on the actual working conditions of domestic servants in India. The survey depicted slave-like conditions for domestic workers all across the nation. As a result, in 1980 Devos began to work with women and girls in the Dindigul district of the State of Tamil Nadu. She helped to organize small groups of domestic workers to help them in whatever way she could. She became upset about the situation of these workers and the general attitude held by both employers and society in general held towards them. They had no voice and had no means to stand up for their rights. They were invisible. She saw how women from the poorest segments of the population slaved as domestic servants, usually with illegally low wages and no rights.

Devos gained a new sense of urgency "after meeting the 13-year-old girl Sangeeta who was raped, pregnant and had aborted – without understanding what had happened to her." To combat this situation, in 1985 she founded the Domestic Workers National Movement, based in Mumbai, which organizes and advocates for women and girls. It now operates in 18 states of the nation, working in 28 different languages. Devos participated with the CosmoGolem project, founded in 2010 by Koen Vanmechelen, which sponsors wooden statues of the Golem travel the world as a symbol of universal children’s rights.

== Honors ==
- In 2000 Devos was granted an honorary doctorate by the Catholic University of Leuven.
- In 2005 she was nominated for the Nobel Peace Prize.
- In 2009 she was awarded the Grand Cross of the Order of the Crown by King Albert II of Belgium.
- In 2012 the Ramkrishna Bajaj Memorial Global Award was given to her by the Priyadarshni Academy, a non-governmental organization engaged in social, educational and cultural pursuits.
