= Jan Vos =

Jan Vos may refer to:

- Jan Vos (footballer) (1888–1939), Dutch footballer
- Jan Vos (poet) (1612–1667), Dutch poet and playwright
- Jan Vos (politician) (born 1972), Dutch politician
- Jan Vos (fictional character), played by Clous van Mechelen in radio and television shows by Wim T. Schippers
