= Justin de Vos =

Dutch footballer

Personal information
- Date of birth: 12 November 1998 (age 28)
- Height: 1.88 m (6 ft 2 in)
- Position: Centre back

Team information
- Current team: EVV Eindhoven

Youth career
- VV De Meern
- MPFS Marbella
- USV Elinkwijk
- A.V.V. Zeeburgia
- AFC
- –2015: FC Dordrecht
- 2015–2016: VV De Meern

Senior career*
Years	Team	Apps	(Gls)
2016–2018	Achilles '29	17	(0)
2018–2019	FC Lienden	5	(1)
2019–	EVV Eindhoven		
- * Club domestic league appearances and goals as of 20:31, 9 May 2019 (UTC)

Justin de Vos (born 12 November 1998) is a Dutch football player of Curaçao descent who plays for EVV Eindhoven.

== Club career ==
He made his professional debut in the Eerste Divisie for Achilles '29 on 21 October 2016 in a game against RKC Waalwijk.

On 26 January 2019, de Vos signed with the amateur team of FC Eindhoven, EVV Eindhoven.
