= Frank de Vos =

Personal information
- Full name: Frank de Vos
- Nationality: Dutch
- Born: 8 August 1956 (age 70) Leiden
- Height: 1.93 m (6 ft 4 in)

Sailing career
- Sport: Sailing
- Club: Watersport Vereniging Braassemermeer
- Coached by: Jack van Hellemond
- Class: Flying Dutchman
- Updated on 2014-01-29

Frank de Vos (born 8 August 1956 in Delft) is a sailor from the Netherlands, who represented his country at the 1976 Summer Olympics in Kingston, Ontario, Canada as substitute for the Dutch Flying Dutchman team of Erik Vollebregt and Sjoerd Vollebregt. In 1980 De Vos returned to the 1980 Summer Olympics, which was boycotted by several countries, as substitute for the Dutch Flying Dutchman.

== Sailing career ==
De Vos started sailing in the Solo. In this class De Vos took the Dutch Championship 1975.

== Professional life ==
De Vos studied Law at the Leiden University and is nowadays partner at Clifford Chance LLP, Amsterdam.

== Sources ==
- "Nederlandse delegatie" (in Dutch). Leeuwarder courant : hoofdblad van Friesland. 1976-07-12.
- Gerrit Pranger (ed.). Journaal 1978 (in Dutch). Amsterdam: Koninklijk Nederlands Watersport Verbond, Uitgeverij Interdijk b.v.
- "Nederlandse delegatie" (in Dutch). Leeuwarder courant : hoofdblad van Friesland. 1976-07-12.
- "Olympische zeilselectie" (in Dutch). De Telegraaf. 1976-05-20.
- "Montréal 1976 Official Report, Volume I: Organization" (PDF). Ottawa: COJO. 1978. Archived from the original (PDF) on February 2, 2014.
- "Montréal 1976 Official Report, Volume II: Facilities" (PDF). Ottawa: COJO. 1978. Archived from the original (PDF) on February 2, 2014.
- "Montréal 1976 Official Report, Volume III: Results" (PDF). Ottawa: COJO. 1978. Archived from the original (PDF) on January 1, 2014.
- "Zeilers: 'We gaan'" (in Dutch). De Telegraaf. 1980-05-16.
- "Zeilploeg bleef buiten de medailles" (in Dutch). De Telegraaf. 1980-07-30.
- "Staartjes: "Het heeft niet meegezeten" Geen medailles voor Nederlandse zeilers" (in Dutch). De waarheid. 1980-07-31.
- "Franse zeilploeg blijft thuis" (in Dutch). Amigoe. 1980-05-22.
- "Games of the XXII Olympiad, Volume I: Moscow, Tallinn, Leningrad, Kiev and Minsk" (PDF). Fizkultura i Sport Publishers. 1981. Archived from the original (PDF) on 2013-10-17.
- "Games of the XXII Olympiad, Volume II: Organisation" (PDF). Fizkultura i Sport Publishers. 1981. Archived from the original (PDF) on 2013-10-17.
- "Games of the XXII Olympiad, Volume III: Participants and Results" (PDF). Fizkultura i Sport Publishers. 1981. Archived from the original (PDF) on October 17, 2013.
- "Frank de Vos". www.linkedin.com.
- "Clifford Change LLP". www.cliffordchance.com.
