= Missionary Sisters of the Immaculate Heart of Mary =

Roman Catholic religious congregation

- Abbreviation: ICM
- Established: 1897; 129 years ago
- Founder: Mother Marie Louise De Meester, ICM
- Founded at: Mulagumudu, India
- Type: Centralized Religious Institute of Consecrated Life of Pontifical Right (for Women)
- Purpose: Educational, social and foreign mission work
- Headquarters: Generalate; Rome, Italy
- Region served: Europe, Asia, Americas and Africa
- Members: 790
- Religious affiliation: Roman Catholic
- Formerly called: Missionary Canonesses of St. Augustine (1897–1963)

The Missionary Sisters of the Immaculate Heart of Mary (I.C.M.) are a Roman Catholic religious institute of pontifical right of women, dedicated to the service of those in need in the Third World.

== History ==
The Sisters were founded in Mulagumudu, South India, then under the rule of the British Raj, in 1897 by Mother Marie Louise De Meester, a canoness regular from Ypres, Belgium. Always feeling a strong interest in the foreign missions of the Catholic Church, with the blessing of her prioress, De Meester left her native country to respond to the invitation of the Discalced Carmelite friars in India to care for orphans and abandoned children. Her sole companion was Dame Marie Ursule (civil name Germaine De Jonckheere), a novice of that same monastery. They arrived in India on November 7, 1897.

The Sisters ran homes for the aged and the sick, orphanages and schools. Other women came to join them and eventually the canonesses in India separated from the monastery in Belgium and formed a new religious congregation, called the Missionary Canonesses of St. Augustine. The work began to grow and expand. From India De Meester established new communities of canonesses in the Philippines (1910), the West Indies (1914), the United States (1919), in Congo, (1920), and China (1923). She died in Belgium in 1928.

After World War II, the canonesses established new communities in Burundi (1944), Hong Kong (1953), Taiwan (1959), Guatemala, (1964), Brazil (1965), Cameroon (1969), Haiti (1977), Lebanon, (1987), Mongolia (1995), and Chad (1996).

In 1963 the canonesses sought to strengthen their missionary identity and became affiliated with the missionary priests of the Congregation of the Immaculate Heart of Mary. They then changed the structure of the congregation to drop their status as a semi-enclosed religious order and their name to the one they now have.

The congregation numbers more than 790 members living in over 100 communities located on five continents. (2010).

== Notable members ==
Sister Jeanne Devos, I.C.M., is a leader in the National Domestic Workers Movement, which advocates in defense of domestic workers in India, who has been nominated for the Nobel Peace Prize.
