= Virtual Object System =

- Developer(s): Interreality
- Stable release: 0.23.0 / April 15, 2006 (S5 UI preview released October 19, 2007)
- Operating system: Linux, Windows, Mac OS X
- Type: Distributed systems, Networking, 3D graphics
- License: GNU Lesser General Public License
- Website: interreality.org

The Virtual Object System (VOS) is a computer software technology for creating distributed object systems. The sites hosting Vobjects are typically linked by a computer network, such as a local area network or the Internet. Vobjects may send messages to other Vobjects over these network links (remotely) or within the same host site (locally) to perform actions and synchronize state. In this way, VOS may also be called an object-oriented remote procedure call system. In addition, Vobjects may have a number of directed relations to other Vobjects, which allows them to form directed graph data structures.

VOS is patent free, and its implementation is Free Software. The primary application focus of VOS is general purpose, multiuser, collaborative 3D virtual environments or virtual reality. The primary designer and author of VOS is Peter Amstutz.
