= Hendrik de Vos =

South African cricketer (born 1969)

Personal information
- Born: 5 October 1969 (age 57); Klerksdorp
- Batting: Right handed
- Role: Wicketkeeper
- Relatives: Dirk de Vos(brother)
- Source: Cricinfo, 16 May 2018

Hendrik de Vos (born 5 October 1969) is a South African cricketer. He played First-class cricket and List A cricket matches in South Africa from 1990 to 2001.
