= Jan De Vos =

Jan De Vos may refer to:

- Jan de Vos (historian) (1936–2011), Belgian historian
- Jan De Vos (politician) (1844–1923), Belgian politician
