= Lu De Vos =

Professor emeritus of philosophy

Ludovicus De Vos (born 1953) also known as Lu De Vos, is a professor emeritus of philosophy at KU Leuven.

== Works ==
- Cobben, Paul; De Vos, Lu; Cruysberghs, Paul; Jonkers, Peter, eds. (2006). Hegel-Lexikon. Darmstadt: Wissenschaftliche Buchgesellschaft. ISBN 978-3-534-16895-8.
- Metaphysik und Metaphysikkritik in der Klassischen Deutschen Philosophie (in German). FELIX MEINER VERLAG. 2012-07-01. doi:10.28937/978-3-7873-2264-0. ISBN 978-3-7873-2264-0.
- Die geschichtliche Bedeutung der Kunst und die Bestimmung der Künste. 2005.
