= Vos (Danish band) =

Danish girl group

Vos is a Danish girl group from Als Island, founded in the 1980s. The members are Ilse Dahl, Kathrine Schmidt, Hanne Schmidt and Bente Nissen.

== Singles ==
- "E Spritte"
