= Davos (disambiguation) =

Davos is a municipality in Switzerland.

Davos also may refer to:

- Davos (album), a 2015 album by Computer Magic
- Davos (comics), a supervillain in Marvel Comics' Iron Fist comics
- Davos Platz, a village of Davos
- Davos Seaworth, a fictional character created by George R. R. Martin, appearing in A Song of Ice and Fire
- HC Davos, a professional Swiss hockey club in Davos, Switzerland
- Lake Davos, a lake in Davos
- World Economic Forum, which hosts an annual meeting in Davos, Switzerland, also known as Davos Forums

== See also ==
- Davros, a character in the British television series Doctor Who
