= Jacob de Vos Willemsz =

Dutch poet, art collector, illustrator (1774–1844)

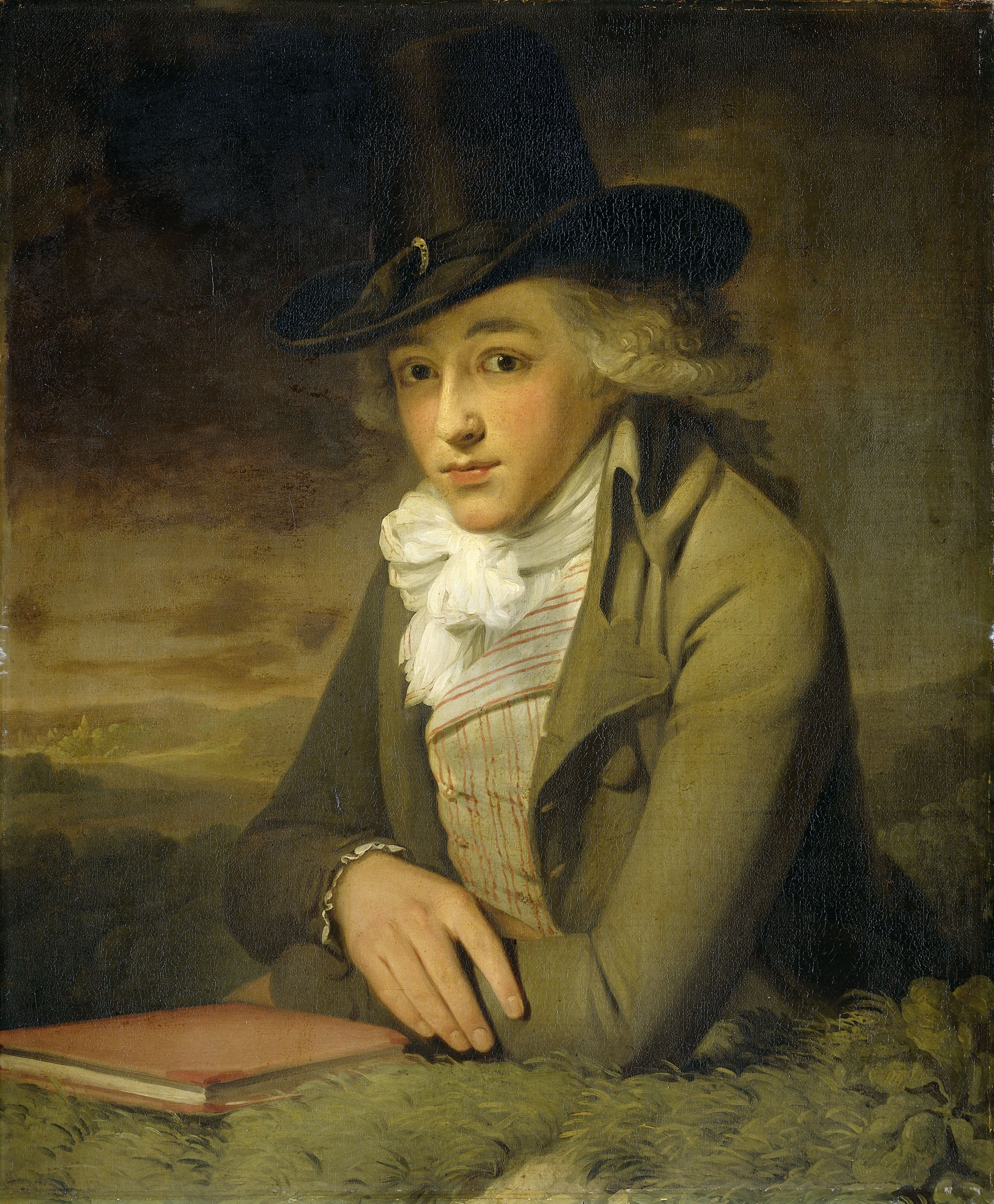
- Portrait of Jacob de Vos Willemsz, artist unknown (from Amsterdam Museum)
- Born: 5 December 1774; Amsterdam, Dutch Republic (now Netherlands)
- Died: 23 July 1844 (aged 69) near Haarlem, Kingdom of the Netherlands (now Netherlands)
- Other names: J. Vos, Jacob de Vos, Jacob Willemnsz de Vos, Gerard Brandt
- Occupations: Poet, draftsman, illustrator, art collector
- Awards: Knight of the Order of the Netherlands Lion (1840)

Jacob de Vos Willemsz (5 December 1774 – 23 July 1844) was a Dutch poet, draftsman, illustrator, and art collector. He was known for his collection of drawn diaries about and for his children.

== Biography ==
Jacob de Vos Willemsz was born on 5 December 1774, in Amsterdam, Dutch Republic (now Netherlands). His uncle was Jacob de Vos (1735–1833), noted art collector.

He became known for his collection of drawn diaries about and for his children, drawn from 1803 to 1809. These diaries demonstrated an intense paternal involvement with his children, and were also a vivid description of the rise of appreciation for children's play. He was the father of Jacob de Vos Jacobsz (1803–1878).

De Vos Willemsz was a member of the Felix Meritis intellectual society, a member fourth class of the Royal Institute of the Netherlands from 1814, and the Democriet poetry society in Haarlem. In 1840, he was appointed Knight of the Order of the Netherlands Lion. De Vos Willemsz died on 23 July 1844, near Haarlem.
