= Mulagumudu =

Mulagumoodu
- Town
- Location in Tamil Nadu, India
- Coordinates: 8°16′05″N 77°17′47″E
- Country: India
- State: Tamil Nadu
- District: KANNIYAKUMARI

Government
  - Type: Democratic

Population (2017)
  - Total: 19,538

Languages
  - Official: Tamil
- Time zone: UTC+5:30 (IST)
- PIN: 629167
- Telephone code: 04651
- Sex ratio: Males-9603 and Females-9935

Mulagumoodu is a town panchayat in Kanniyakumari district in the Indian state of Tamil Nadu.

Mulagumoodu comes under Kalculam taluk, Thuckalay block and Mulagumoodu town panchayat.

== Demographics ==
The census details of Mulagumoodu as per the 2011 census of India is as follows :-

Total population - 19538 Males - 9603 Females - 9935

Population in the age group of 0-6 - 1859 Males - 968 Females - 891

Literates - 16555 Males - 8203 Females - 8352

Scheduled Caste population - 304 Males -142 Females - 162

Scheduled Tribe population - 10 Males - 3 Females - 7

Total workers - 6960 Males -5362 Females - 1598

Main workers - 5953 Males - 4972 Females - 981

Cultivators - 121 Males - 117 Females - 4

== History ==
In the Dutch book named Pater Victor – Een apostel van Zuid-Italië written by Fr. Andreas a Santa Maria, OCD in 1929, it was stated that Fr. Victor came from Belgium to Mulagumoodu in 1860. It was not a Catholic village, though there were some Christians.

In 1888, a cholera epidemic affected this community.

== Geography ==
The Pechiparai Dam water flows at Mulagumoodu via Attukulam and this water fills the following ponds which is very much useful for agriculture. In Back side Of the Church Arunangal there is the Mother Teresa Library its also called "Annai Teresa Padipagam"

== Economy ==
Mulagumoodu is famous for its jack fruits. Tapioca, coconut, plantain and rubber are being cultivated by the farmers of Mulagumoodu.

== Transport ==
Mulagumoodu-Colachel road of 8 km is the shortest road connecting NH47 to the natural harbour at Colachel. At present majority of the people of Mulagumoodu are Christians. St.Mary's church, Mulagumoodu is the Vicariate comes under the Diocese of Kuzhithurai and formerly it was under the Diocese of Kottar.St.Mary's church celebrated its 150th jubilee in the year 2010.

Many decades of narrow path in southern side of St.Mary's Church, Mulagumoodu has been widened as a road benefiting to the villagers of Adakachi Vilai, Arunankal, Kadan Vilai, Kallipara Vilai by connecting Fr.Victor Memorial Rock was formed on 01.05.2016, mainly by Fr.Dominic with the assistance of other fathers and parishners. The road was christened as Fr.Victor road.

== Education ==
1) Infant Jesus High School for girls, Mulagumoodu.

2) Infant Jesus Teacher Training Institute for women, Mulagumoodu.

3) St.Joseph's Hr.Sec.School, Mulagumoodu.

4) St.Joseph's Matriculation Hr.Sec.School, Mulagumoodu.

5) Pope John Paul II College of Education, Mulagumoodu.

6} Fr.victor Library, Mulagumoodu.

7) St. Aloysius Library, Mulagumoodu.

8) Infant Jesus Arts and Science College for women, Mulagumoodu

9) St.Mary's International School (ICSE)

10. Sigaram Academy of Excellence

== Religious sites ==
Mulagumoodu includes many religious worship centres, churches, and temples.
