= Canonesses of Saint-Augustin of the Notre-Dame Congregation =

Catholic female religious order

Canonesses of Saint Augustine of the Notre-Dame Congregation
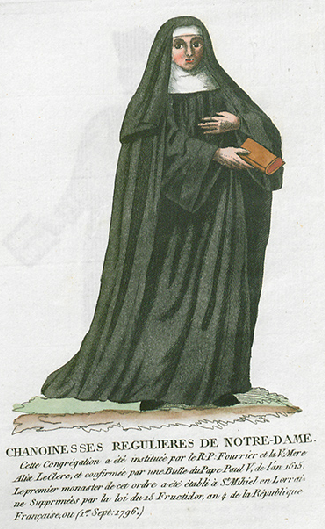

The Canonesses of Saint Augustine of the Notre-Dame Congregation (in Latin: Ordinis Canonissarum Regularium S. Augustini Congregationis Nostræ Dominæ) form a teaching female religious congregation of pontifical right. The sisters dedicate themselves to teaching, charities and are present on four continents: Europe (Belgium, France, Great Britain, Italy, Netherlands, Slovakia, Hungary); America (Brazil and Mexico); Africa (Democratic Republic of the Congo) and Asia (China and Vietnam) with its headquarters in Rome. In 2017, the congregation had 391 nuns in 80 communities.

== History ==
The congregation was founded by Peter Fourier (1564-1640) who in 1597 entrusted the Mattaincourt school to a small community of women headed by Alix Le Clerc (1576-1622). On December 25, 1597, the young woman consecrated herself to God with four companions. The Cardinal of Lorraine approved the institute on December 8, 1603 and authorized the nuns to settle in the Trois-Évêchés. The congregation spread quickly and opened schools in many cities of the Duchy of Lorraine: Poussay, Mattaincourt, Saint-Mihiel, but also in the Duchy of Bar, the Kingdom of France and in the Holy Roman Empire. The papal bull of August 8, 1628 of Pope Urban VIII authorizes the Notre-Dame congregation and recognizes in its members the solemn vow of teaching. The communities originally had a monastic organization and each house was autonomous. At the beginning of the 20th century, a process of unification led several communities to federate in the union of Jupille (1910), then the Roman union (1932). In 1963, the two unions, which included almost all the houses, merged into a single congregation based in Rome. The congregation was not recognized as an apostolic order until three centuries after its foundation at the time of Vatican Council II.

== See also ==
- Canoness
- École Saint-Joseph
- École Notre-Dame les Oiseaux
