= Madeleine Juneau =

Canadian museologist and teacher (1945–2020)

Sister Madeleine Juneau CND, CQ
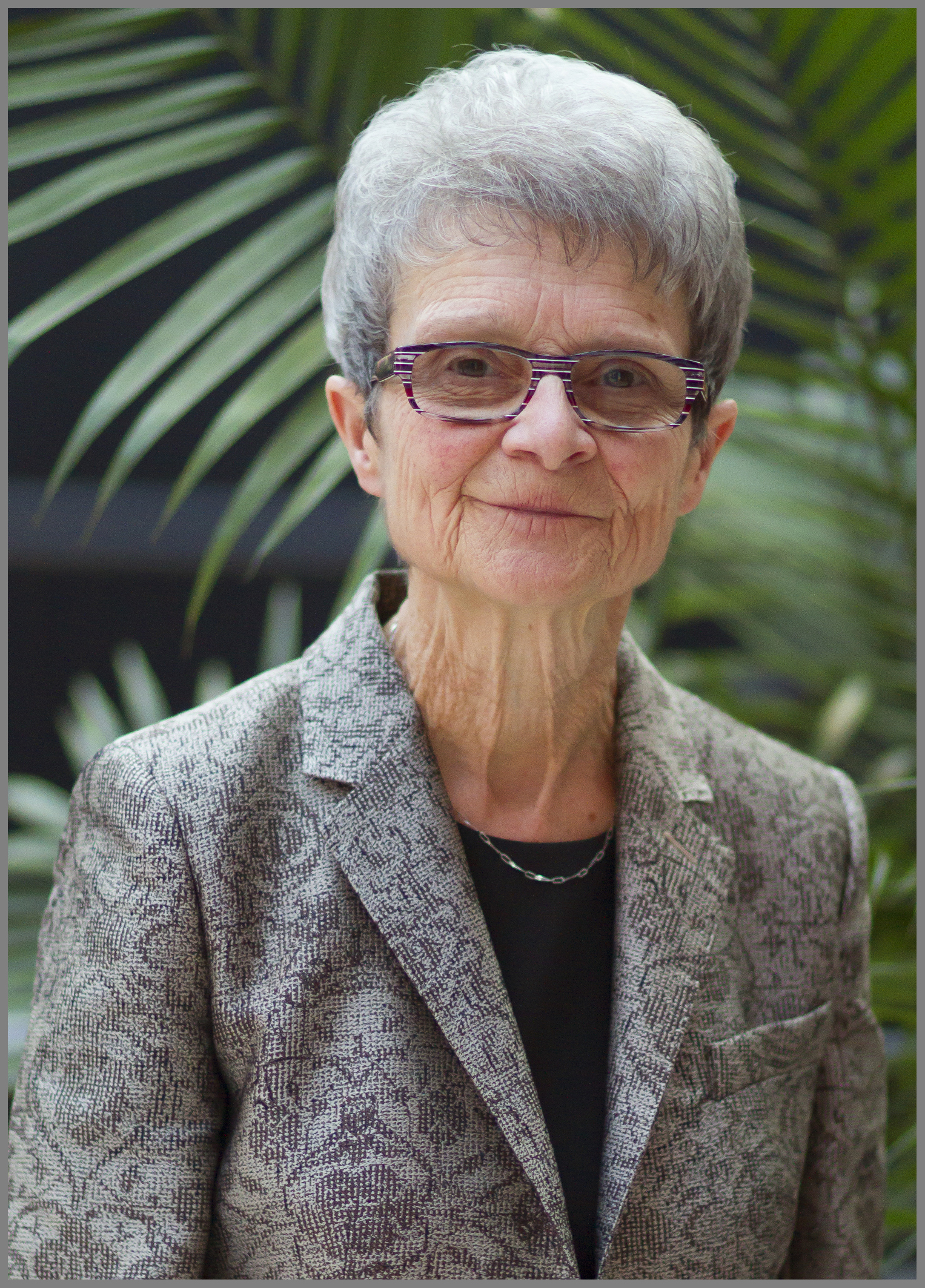

Personal life
- Born: 10 November 1945 Saint-Augustin-de-Desmaures, Canada
- Died: 26 June 2020 (aged 74) Montreal, Canada

Religious life
- Religion: Roman Catholic
- Order: Congregation of Notre Dame of Montreal
- Institute: Executive Director, Maison Saint-Gabriel
- Profession: Museologist; teacher; nun
- Ordination: 1966

Sister Madeleine Juneau, CND, CQ (10 November 1945 – 26 June 2020) was a Canadian museologist and teacher. A Roman Catholic nun, she was a member of the Congregation of Notre Dame of Montreal. Juneau was the recipient of the Medal of the Quebec National Assembly (2011), Thomas-Baillargé award from the Ordre des architectes du Québec, awarded jointly with the Congrégation de Notre-Dame (2012), Queen Elizabeth II Diamond Jubilee Medal (2012), and the Officer of the Order of Montreal (2019).

== Biography ==
Madeleine Juneau was born in Saint-Augustin-de-Desmaures, 10 November 1945. She was one of eleven children and seven of them were boys.

In 1966, Juneau became a religious of the Congregation of Notre-Dame. She taught in Montreal and then, from 1972 to 1982, in Hearst, Ontario. From 1984 to 1997, she was the director of educational services at Maison Saint-Gabriel in Montreal, a historic site owned by this religious community. She became its executive director in 1997.

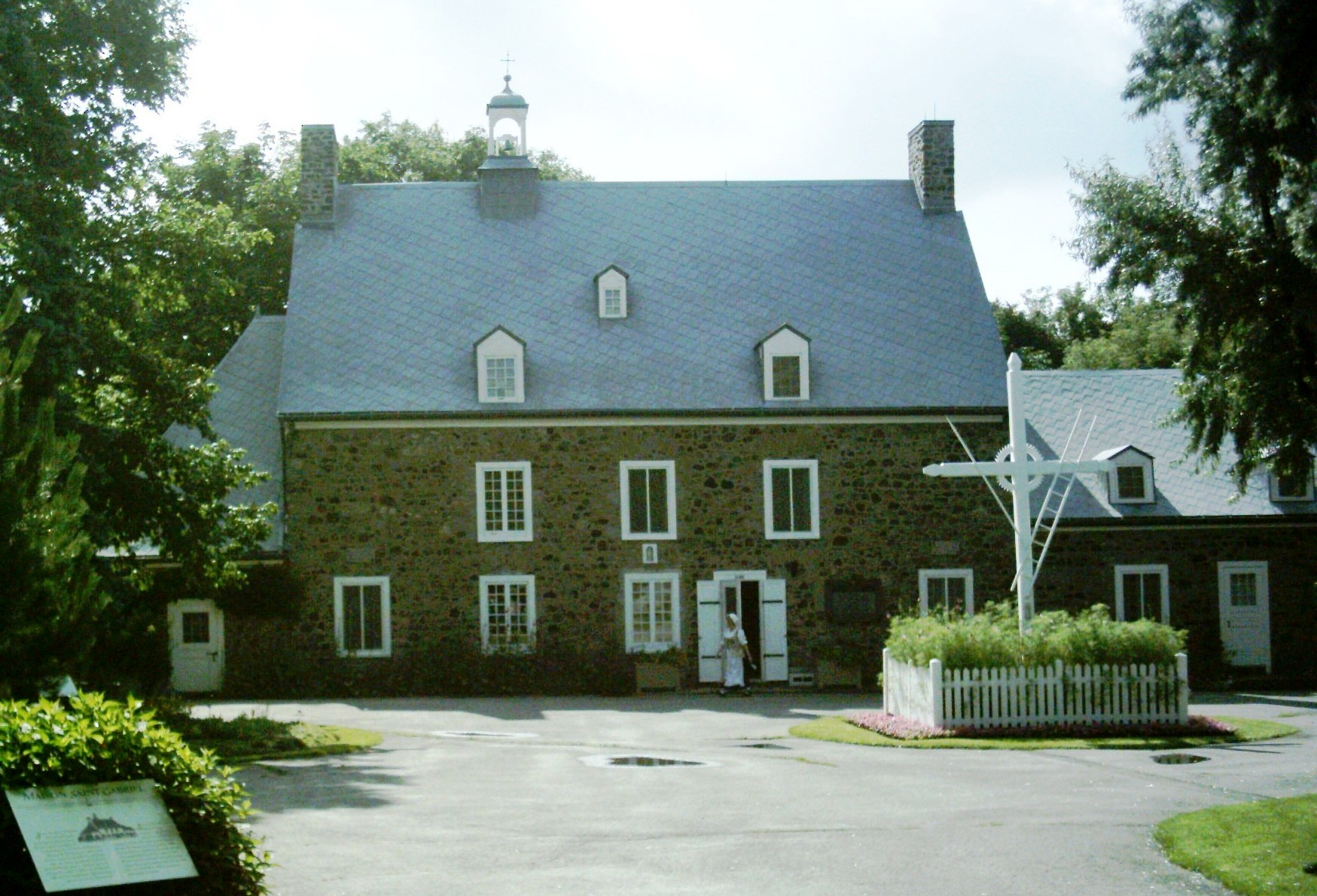
Maison Saint-Gabriel

Open to the public since 1966, Maison Saint-Gabriel was primarily an interpretation center for the work of the Sisters of the Congregation of Notre Dame. In the early 1990s, Maison Saint-Gabriel welcomed some 6,000 visitors per year. It has become a place of interpretation of rural life in New France where the King's Daughters are highlighted as well as the cultural landscape (housing, cooking, daily life). In 1998, the number of visitors increased to 35,000. Various popular education initiatives were added: creation of a historical spice trail, reconstitution of a 17th-century apothecary's garden, organization of auctions on the premises, recitation of tales, presentation of and lectures in a tavern. In 2009–2010, the museum was expanded at a cost of CA$9,500,000 with the transformation of the Jeanne-Le Ber residence, home to the nuns, into the Catherine-Crolo Pavilion, a visitor reception pavilion, including a boutique and herbal tea room, an animation area, a restaurant and conference rooms. Presently, the site attracts more than 75,000 visitors per year. Classified as a historic monument in 1965, the House was designated a National Historic Site by the Historic Sites and Monuments Board of Canada in 2007. It received six Grands prix régionaux du tourisme québécois in 1999, 2003, 2005, 2007, 2009 and 2010 in the category of Tourist Attraction of less than 100,000 visitors, in the Montreal region.

Juneau has served on the boards of directors of the Regroupement économique et social du Sud-Ouest, the Chambre de commerce du Sud-Ouest de Montréal, and the Société historique de Pointe-Saint-Charles. She served as President of the Société des directeurs des musées montréalais (Board of Montreal Museum Directors) for six years. She was a member of the Chamber of Commerce of Metropolitan Montreal, and a member of the Commission franco-québécoise des lieux de mémoire communs. She was also a member of the board of directors of the Association du tourisme religieux et spirituel du Québec, founded in December 2018.

She died in Verdun on 26 June 2020, aged 74.

== Awards and honours ==
In 2013, Juneau received the Prix Gérard-Morisset, one of 14 annual prizes awarded by the Government of Quebec in recognition of an outstanding career in the scientific and cultural fields. This award was given to her in recognition of the role within Maison Saint-Gabriel, in the conservation of its architectural and historical heritage, and in the knowledge of Montreal's heritage. On November 28, 2016, Juneau received from David Johnston, Governor General of Canada, the Governor General's History Award for Excellence in Museum Programs - Living History! for her exhibition "The Canadian Horse, a breed apart", presented at Maison Saint-Gabriel in 2015 on the occasion of the 350th anniversary of the Canadian horse. On June 22, 2017, in Quebec City, Premier of Quebec Philippe Couillard decorated her as a Knight of the National Order of Quebec, and the following day, June 23, at Rideau Hall in Ottawa, she received the Meritorious Service Cross - Civil Division from David Johnston, which recognizes an action that has been performed with exceptional professionalism and from which Canada has benefited significantly.
