= Pierre Le Ber =

- Born: 1669; Montreal, New France
- Died: October 1, 1707 (aged 37–38); Pointe-Saint-Charles, New France
- Parent(s): Jeanne Le Moyne; Jacques Le Ber
- Relatives: Jeanne Le Ber (sister); Charles le Moyne (uncle)

Pierre Le Ber (1669 – 1 October 1707), a son of Jacques Le Ber and brother of Jeanne Le Ber, was a painter from Montreal.

== Biography ==
Le Ber was a member of two of the wealthiest families in the colony and used his wealth to be a generous member of his community, founding an almshouse. He contributed to the Congregation of Notre Dame, likely because of his sister, Jeanne, was a recluse there. He was one of the founders and supporters of the Brothers Hospitallers (Hôpital Général of the Charon brothers).

Le Ber was considered an untalented amateur painter in his lifetime. In 1965, his so-called primitive painting of Marguerite Bourgeoys, restored in 1963-1964 in New York, brought him to the attention of the Canadian art world and his surviving work and his life have been examined. The oil painting of Marguerite Bourgeoys as a nearly 80-year old compassionate woman who suffered and shared the suffering of others is in the possession of the mother house of the Congregation of Notre Dame, Montreal. His work marks him as an important artist of the time.

== Gallery ==
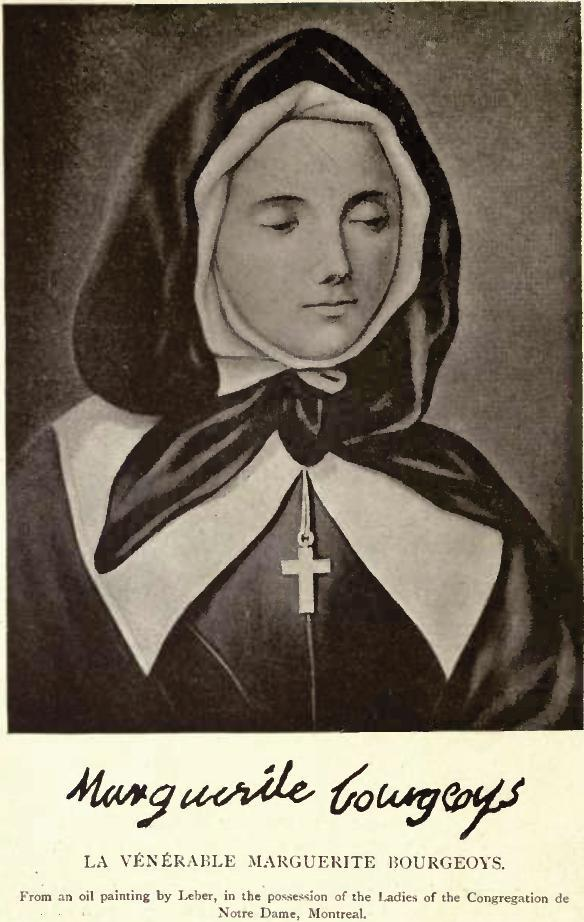
La Venerable Marguerite Bourgeoys by Pierre Le Ber c. 1700, before restoration.

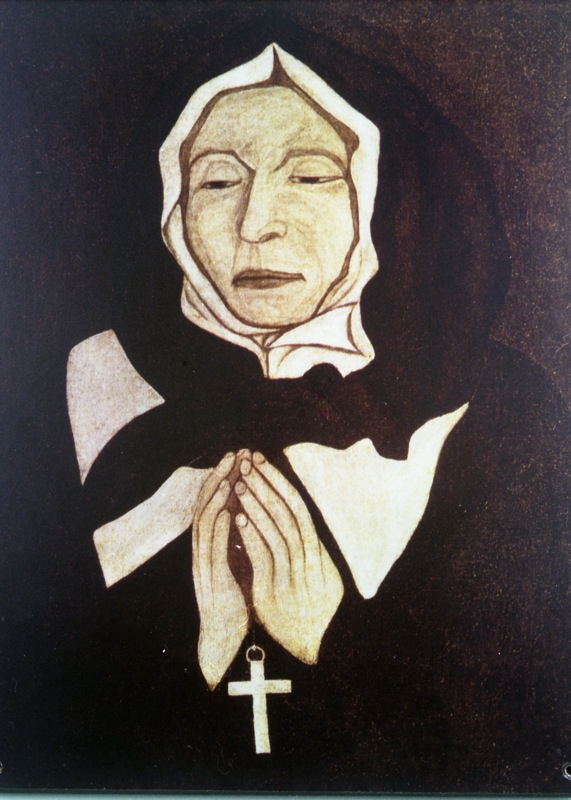
Le Ber's painting of Marguerite Bourgeoys, c. 1700, restored.

== Bibliography ==
- Gagnon, François-Marc; Cloutier, Nicole (1976). Premiers Peintres de la Nouvelle-France, vol. 1. Québec: Ministère des Affaires culturelles Du Québec.
