= Alix Le Clerc =

French founder of religious order (1576–1622)

Blessed Alix Le Clerc C.N.D.
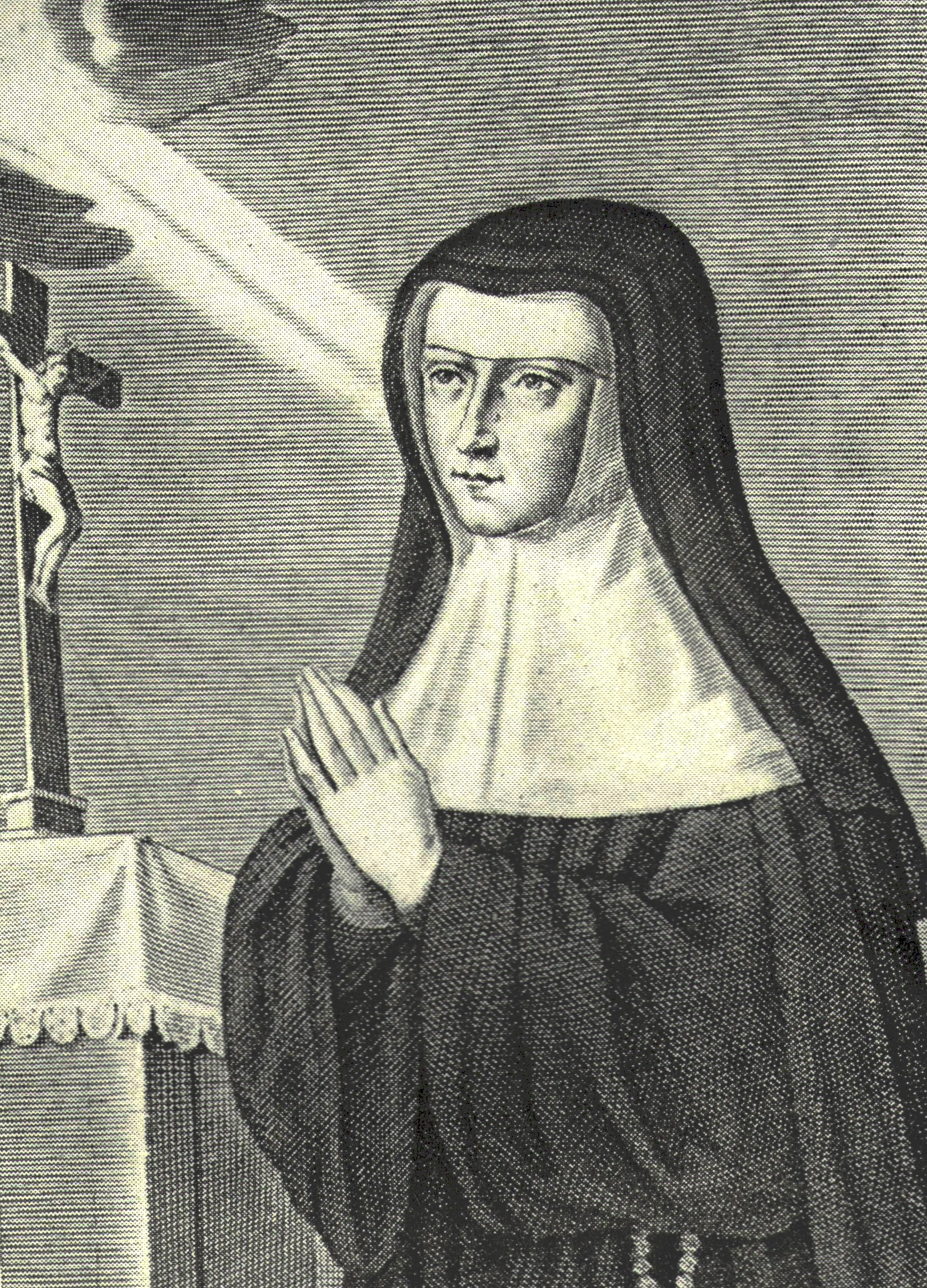
- Born: 2 February 1576; Remiremont, Duchy of Lorraine, Holy Roman Empire
- Died: 9 January 1622 (aged 45); Nancy, Duchy of Lorraine, Holy Roman Empire
- Venerated in: Catholic Church (Canonesses of St. Augustine of the Congregation of Our Lady)
- Beatified: 4 May 1947, Vatican City, by Pope Pius XII
- Major shrine: Cathedral of Our Lady, Nancy, Meurthe-et-Moselle, France
- Feast: 9 January

Alix Le Clerc (2 February 1576 – 9 January 1622), known as Mother Alix, was a French religious leader and founder of the Canonesses of Saint-Augustin of the Notre-Dame Congregation (French: Notre-Dame), a religious order created to provide education to girls, especially those living in poverty. They opened Schools of Our Lady throughout Europe. Offshoots of this order brought its mission and spirit around the globe. Le Clerc was beatified by the Catholic Church in 1947.

== Life ==
=== Early life ===
Alix (the local form of Alice) Le Clerc was born on 2 February 1576 into a wealthy family in Remiremont in the independent Duchy of Lorraine, part of the Holy Roman Empire. She was a vivacious girl who loved music and dancing. She would spend her evenings partying with her young friends. When she was about 18, her family moved to Mattaincourt, a manufacturing center.

=== Conversion ===
Three years later, a sudden illness confined her to her bed. While there, her only reading material was a devotional book. From the reading and reflection she was able to do while recuperating from her illness, Le Clerc began to feel the need for a change in her life. She approached the pastor of the town, Dom Peter Fourier, with whom she shared this growing conviction about the need for a new direction in her life, but that none of the religious orders appealed to her.

A purported vision of Our Lady answered her questioning and gave her the direction she sought, as she felt called to care for the daughters of the poor of the region, who had little or no access to education. Supported in this by Fourier, who himself had seen the desperate need for this among the rural populace of his parish, Le Clerc resolved to commit her life to this goal. She was joined in this enterprise by four of her friends, with whom she established a community where they could follow lives of simplicity, prayer, and respecting the presence of God in each girl whom they would receive for instruction.

=== Foundress ===
On Christmas Day 1597, Le Clerc and her companions made private vows in the parish church to Fourier. The small community opened their first school the following July in Poussay, where they offered free education to the girls of the duchy. Expansion of their work developed quickly, with communities being opened in Mattaincourt (1599), Saint-Mihiel (1602), Nancy (1603), Pont-à-Mousson (1604), Verdun, and Saint-Nicolas-de-Port (1605). All the schools took the name of Notre-Dame.

Le Clerc established herself in Nancy, capital of the duchy, and devoted herself to the care of the girls who came to the schools of the new congregation. At the same time, working through major obstacles, she and Fourier developed constitutions for the new congregation through which the communities could be legally recognized by the Church and the State.

The vision Le Clerc and Fourier had was one in which schools would give a free education to all, poor and rich, and all girls would be welcome, regardless of whether they were Catholic or Protestant. Additionally, the other needs of their locales would be answered, with visits to the sick and poor. They encountered resistance to this open form of life from the hierarchy, who did not look favorably on their teaching outside a cloister. In consultation with the first Sisters, especially Le Clerc, the final form of the constitutions which Fourier wrote took an innovative answer to this by allowing two ways of life to those women who wished to follow the goals of the congregation. In keeping with ancient practice, each community would be autonomous, subject to the local bishop, and would each have to seek this formal recognition on its own from the local religious authorities. The houses were to be of two forms, all following the Rule of St. Augustine, as well as the constitutions:

- Those monasteries whose members who would take public vows (canonesses) and would observe full monastic enclosure, wearing the habit of the congregation.
- Those monasteries whose members would take private vows (Daughters/Sisters (French: Filles) of the congregation) and would be free to leave the monastery with the approval of the Superiors of the house for any legitimate purpose, such as going to Confession, participating in Mass when unable to do so in the monastery, or participating in works of charity. They would not wear the religious habit of the Congregation, but instead one developed for that community.

The first approval for the Constitutions came on 6 March 1617 from the Bishop of Toul, in whose territory Nancy then lay, as a result of which that became the first monastery of the congregation. Le Clerc and the members of that community professed public vows on 2 December 1618, at which time she took the religious name of Teresa of Jesus, after the great Carmelite foundress. Immediately following the ceremony, Fourier met with the assembled Superiors of the various houses and distributed copies of the approved constitutions for their study and observance. Shortly after that, the canonesses of Nancy held their first formal elections and Le Clerc was elected the prioress of the community.

Le Clerc oversaw the development of the congregation as the various houses, each in their own turn, became formally recognized. For the rest of her life, she led the development of the spiritual and practical aspects of the lives of the canonesses in the various monasteries. She would visit each new community, to instill in them the spirit of their founding, saying to them, Que Dieu soit votre amour entier! (May God be your only love!), reflecting the deep spiritual life she maintained in the midst of her responsibilities in the congregation.

=== Death and veneration ===
Le Clerc died on 9 January 1622 at the monastery in Nancy. She was buried in the cemetery of the monastery in a lead coffin.

The cause for her canonization was begun in the latter part of the century, but proceeded slowly. The monastery in Nancy was destroyed during the upheavals of the French Revolution, and the traces of the grave were lost. With the re-establishment of Catholic institutions in France in the early 19th-century, the cause was taken up again, but faced the difficulty of there being no remains, normally required during the process. Various efforts were made by a number of priests to find Le Clerc's remains in the precincts of the former cloister of the monastery over the next century, without success.

Despite this obstacle, the Holy See decided to proceed with the beatification of Mother Teresa of Jesus. This was done by Pope Pius XII on 4 May 1947.

==== Discovery of remains ====
Not long after this declaration of her holiness by the Catholic Church, in 1950 a group of young students in Nancy was exploring the basement of a building in the city and found a lead coffin buried nearly 5 feet (1.5 meters) below the ground. By 1960, the remains were conclusively identified as those of Le Clerc, and were placed for veneration in the chapel of the Notre Dame School of the city. A special chapel was eventually built for the remains in the cathedral and they were transferred there on 14 October 2007, where they are available for veneration by the public.

== Legacy ==
The congregation spread throughout France, into which the duchy was forcibly absorbed in the 1630s. Within thirty years of Le Clerc's death, the monastery which had been established in Troyes was instrumental in the extension of her vision to the New World. Through a connection with the governor of Fort Ville-Marie in the colony of New France, the canonesses had offered to go there to educate its children, but the governor felt that the colony was unable to support a cloistered community of teachers at that stage of its development. Instead, they recruited Marguerite Bourgeoys, the president of a sodality attached to the community, to bring this service to the colony. She went there in 1653, and within five years her work there led to the founding of the Congregation of Notre Dame of Montreal, an unenclosed institute of religious sisters with the same goal of free education for the poor. Today, they have 1,150 Sisters serving worldwide.

The congregation had also spread to other regions of Europe by the time it faced a century of upheaval, starting with the French Revolution, which closed many of their houses. In central Europe, communities were scattered, moving back and forth between Germany (founded in 1640) and Bohemia. Out of this chaos, Theresa Gerhardinger, a former student of the suppressed monastery in Stadtamhof, came to found the School Sisters of Notre Dame in the Kingdom of Bavaria in 1833. It currently has 3,500 members working in over 30 countries around the world.

At the time of Fourier's canonization in 1897, thirty monasteries of the congregation still functioned in Europe. Over the next decades, the congregation expanded to South America, Africa, and Asia, and they now serve in 43 nations. Their mission has expanded to include work for human rights, such as the protection of the rights of migrants and the promotion of justice for developing nations. The General Chapter of 2008 formally recognized the many groups of alumni and associates of the congregation which had sprung up around the world as full partners in the heritage of Fourier and Le Clerc.
