= Jeanne Le Ber =

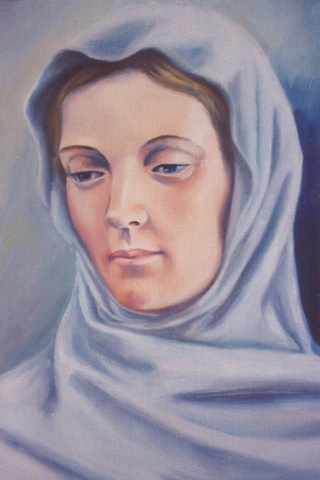
- Born: 4 January 1662; Montreal, New France
- Died: 3 October 1714 (aged 52); Montreal, New France

Jeanne Le Ber (4 January 1662 – 3 October 1714) was a recluse in New France.

== Family and education ==
Jeanne Le Ber was born in Ville-Marie (Montreal), on January 4, 1662. As a daughter of Jeanne Le Moyne and Jacques Le Ber, Jeanne was raised within a wealthy and influential family; her mother was a sister of Charles Le Moyne. Jeanne Le Ber was baptized the day she was born by Gabriel Souart, Paul Chomedey de Maisonneuve being her godfather and Jeanne Mance her godmother.

She took an early interest in the spiritual life of the community and was a frequent visitor with her godmother, Jeanne Mance at the Hôtel-Dieu. She also had a friendship with Marguerite Bourgeoys, the foundress of the Congregation of Notre Dame, who influenced her spiritual life. To complete the formal education she spent three years, 1674 to 1677, as a boarder with the Ursulines of Quebec where her aunt, Marie Le Ber de l’Annonciation, taught. At the age of 15, she returned to her family in Montreal.

As the only daughter (she had three younger brothers) of Jacques Le Ber, with a dowry of approximately 50,000 écus, she was rightly considered the most eligible girl in New France.

== Reclusion ==
When she was eighteen, she obtained from her parents permission to live as a recluse in her family home. Completely withdrawn from the world, she left her home only to go to Mass. When the sisters of the Congregation of Notre Dame decided to build a church on their property, Jeanne had a three-room apartment behind the altar built to her specifications, in return for a generous gift. Her amended vows, which covered perpetual seclusion, chastity, and poverty, had not caused her to divest herself of properties given to her by her family.

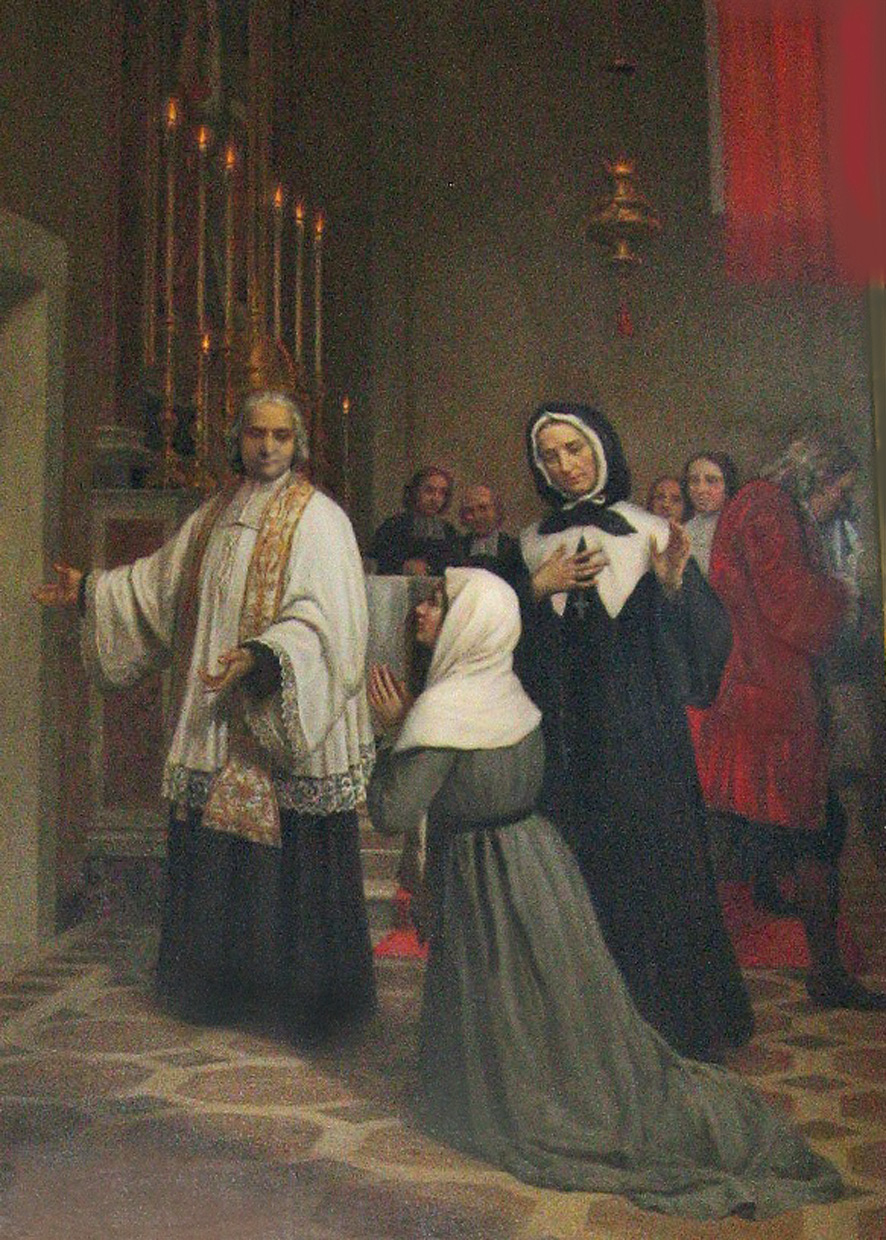
Reclusion for Jeanne Le Ber

This followed the traditional path of pre-Reformation anchoresses who came from wealthy and/or noble families, such as the DeBraose sisters.

In November 1682 she refused to leave her cell to attend her dying mother and later refused to assume the management of the household for her widowed father. Her father, Jacques le Ber, visited her twice a year. His request to be buried in the church of the sisters of the Congregation of Notre Dame to be near his daughter was granted, but Jeanne, to the disappointment of the curious, did not attend his funeral in 1706.

On 24 June 1685 she took a simple vow of perpetual seclusion, chastity, and poverty. Her spiritual directors, François Dollier de Casson and Seguenot, encouraged her to continue her pious observances. As befitting her social rank, and again, in the tradition of pre-Reformation anchoritism, she retained throughout her years of withdrawal from the world an attendant, her cousin Anna Barroy, who saw to her physical requirements and accompanied her to mass. The most well-known anchoritic Rule of the Middle Ages, Ancrene Wisse clearly specifies that anchoresses should have female servants to assist with their daily needs both to preserve their isolation and to guard their reputations. Jeanne sewed and embroidered church vestments, made clothing for the most needy, and provided for the schooling of disadvantaged young women.

She became a well-known person in the colony, and met with important visitors upon occasion. At her death the remainder of her estate was willed to the sisters of the Congregation of Notre Dame. In 1698, Bishop Saint-Vallier, returning from France, accompanied two English gentlemen, one of them a Protestant minister, on a visit to her.

She attended to a number of business matters, for she retained her family's property during her lifetime. This was a practice often expected of medieval anchoresses who controlled vast estates, such as Loretta de Braose, Countess of Leicester. She ceded the farm at Pointe Saint-Charles to the Hôpital Général of the Charon brothers. The land of the former farm is today on the Jeanne-Le Ber federal electoral district. It was named for Jeanne Le Ber.

Before the Roman Catholic Church would canonize Jeanne Le Ber, it required that her buried remains be confirmed as hers. As Le Ber led the life of a recluse, she did little else other than pray and sew vestments and altar clothes until her death in 1714. The Church asked a team that included forensic anthropologist Kathy Reichs to verify what were thought to be Le Ber's bones. The team found that the teeth were notched as if they had regularly bitten thread. The bones were marked by arthritis, as the knees of a person who often kneeled to pray might be. Other notable features agreed with Le Ber's known age, establishing the bones were indeed hers.

== Legacy ==
The Recluse Sisters were founded in 1943, in Alberta. Their inspiration is Jeanne Le Ber. In 2004, the Jeanne-Le Ber federal electoral district was named for Jeanne Le Ber.
