= Maison Saint-Gabriel =

Maison Saint-Gabriel, Museum and historic site
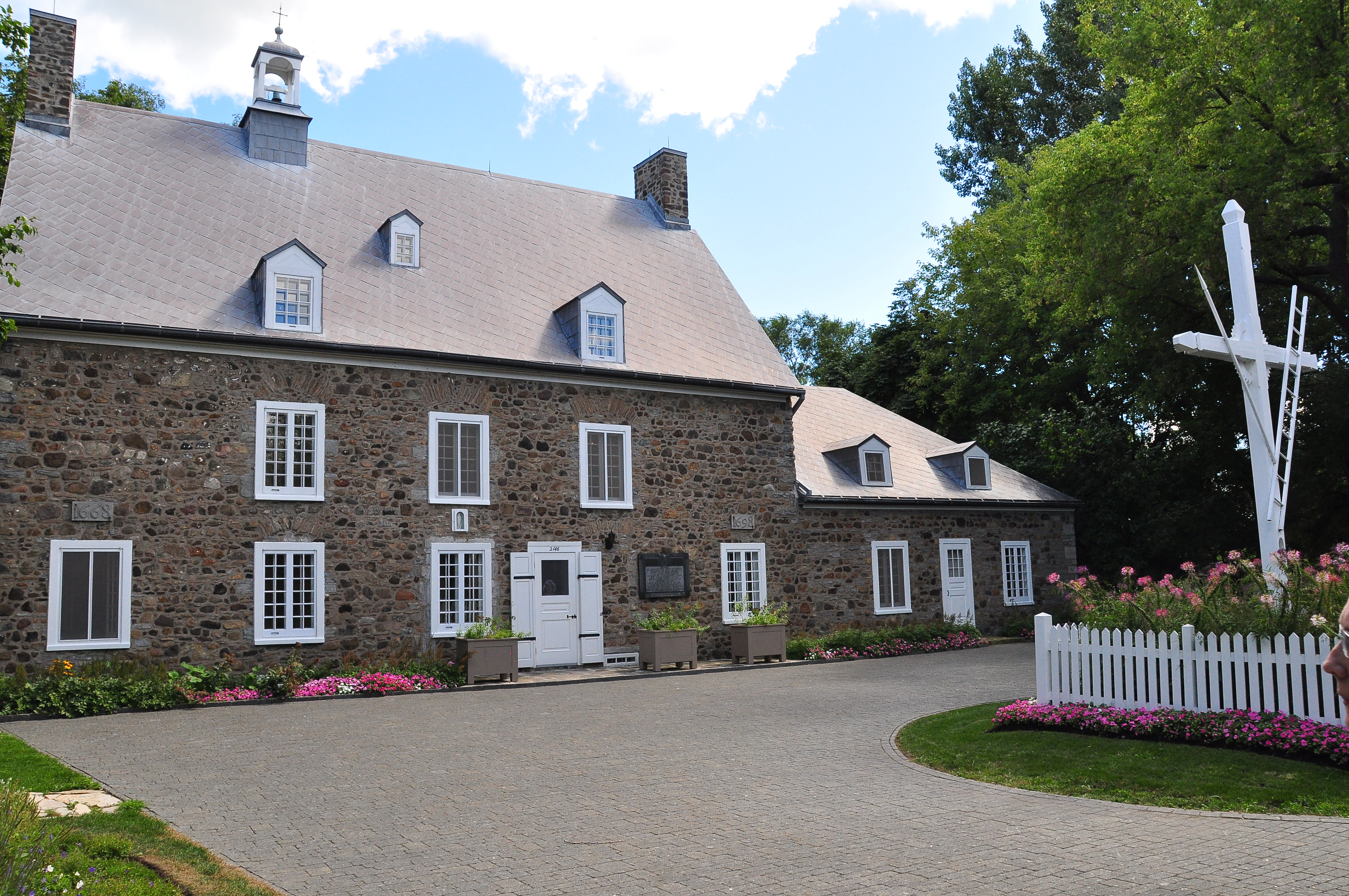

- Location of Maison Saint-Gabriel in Montreal
- Established: March 1966
- Location: Pointe-Saint-Charles, Le Sud-Ouest, Montreal, Quebec, Canada
- Coordinates: 45.4759°N 73.5560°W
- Type: History museum
- Public transit access: at Charlevoix at LaSalle station

National Historic Site of Canada
- Official name: Maison Saint-Gabriel National Historic Site of Canada
- Designated: 2007

Patrimoine culturel du Québec
- Official name: Maison Saint-Gabriel
- Type: Historic monument
- Designated: 1965

The Maison Saint-Gabriel Museum is located in Montreal, Quebec and is dedicated to preserving the history, heritage and artifacts of the settlers of New France in the mid 17th century. The museum consists of a small farm, which has been administered for more than 300 years by the Sisters of the Congregation of Notre Dame of Montreal, founded by Marguerite Bourgeoys in Montreal in 1658.

The site was designated a National Historic Site of Canada in 2007.

== Beginning ==
On October 31, 1662, Paul de Chomedey de Maisonneuve conceded land in Pointe-Saint-Charles to Marguerite Bourgeoys. The purpose of this land was to establish a farm that would feed the Congregation of Notre Dame of Montreal and support its work. In order to plant crops, mainly corn, wheat, and pumpkin, the land was cleared by engagés. These workers helped with the heavy work, and also helped protect the Congregation from any enemy attacks.

In 1668, Marguerite Bourgeoys bought land adjacent to hers, on which stood a house and a barn, from Francois Le Ber and Jeanne Testard. Though it was never referred to as such at the time, this later become the Maison Saint-Gabriel. Initially, Sister Catherine Crolo was primarily in charge of the farm and the house: she planned the labour, the planting, and the harvest, as well as the transport of produce from the farm to the surrounding community. Sister Crolo was also responsible for overseeing the other Sisters in the community.

== School ==
In its early years, in addition to providing subsistence for the Congregation, the farm served as a preparatory school. It housed young women destined for or residing in Montreal, as well as some Filles du Roi, who were recruited in France. These girls were brought to New France in order to provide wives for the numerous single men of the colony, and by so doing, to boost the settler population; this plan was in effect from 1663 to 1673.

== House and farm ==
In 1693, the old farmhouse burned down. However, the foundation and the creamery survived the fire, and were incorporated into the reconstruction of the house, which was completed in 1698. This project was spearheaded by tradesmen, mainly masons, carpenters, and woodworkers. The architecture of the rebuilt house, mainly the two-storey body, the oak frame and ash beams, and the lean-tos, contributed to the heritage value of the house because it captured the essence of 17th century structural design.

In the early to mid 18th century, in order to maintain the agricultural roots of the house and to expand the farm, the Congregation bought many pieces of surrounding land. Throughout the 18th century, the Sisters cultivated wheat and oats and built a chicken coop, a barn, and stables. In the 19th century, the animals raised on the farm were used to produce butter, wool, soap, and leather.

== 19th century ==
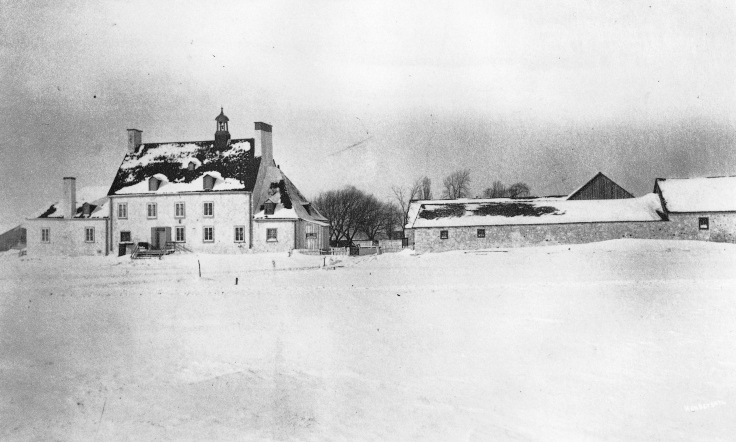
The Maison Saint-Gabriel in 1865.

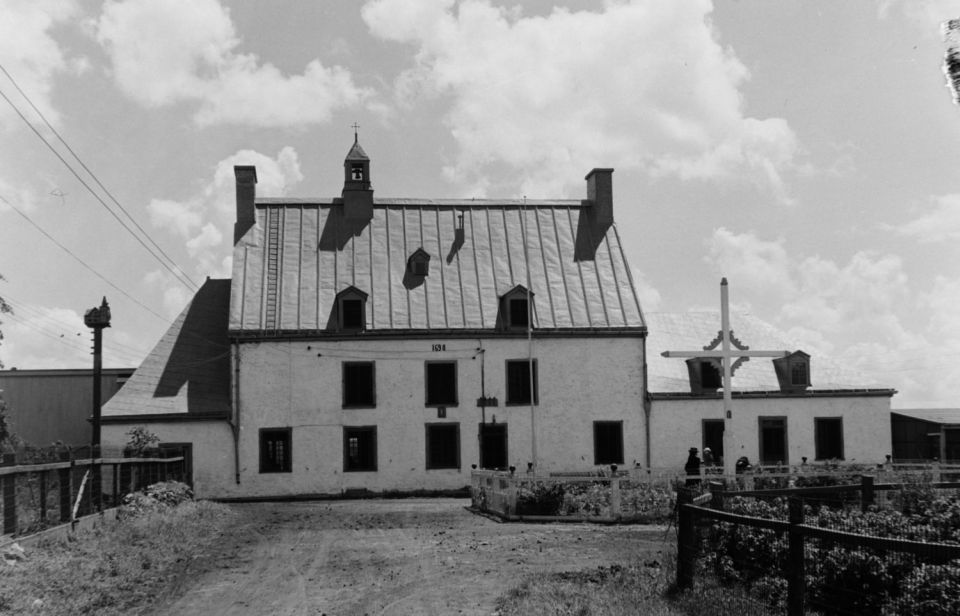
The Maison Saint-Gabriel in 1939.

The house was transformed and modified over the years. As the city of Montreal expanded and industrialized and as immigration increased, some of the farmland of the Congregation of Notre Dame of Montreal was sold to allow for the construction of new housing. The construction of the railway and the opening of the Lachine Canal brought rapid growth and urbanization to Pointe-Saint-Charles, and from the 1850s onward, developers and the city of Montreal slowly dismantled the domain.

== Museum ==
In the early 1960s, after officially celebrating the 300th anniversary of Marguerite Bourgeoys' ownership of land in Pointe-Saint-Charles, interest in turning the original house into a museum increased. However, in order to do so, another establishment needed to be constructed to house the sisters who would oversee the museum project. Therefore, the construction of the Jeanne-LeBer house began in 1963, and was completed in 1964.

The Maison Saint-Gabriel, the original farm house purchased by Bourgeoys in 1668, was then classified as a historic monument by the Ministère de la Culture, des Communications et de la Condition féminine in October 1965. Work began to restore the house that same year, under the supervision of architect Victor Depocas. The objective of the restoration was to conserve the walls and re-create within them the living conditions of the sisters who resided in the house in the 17th century. Thus, the kitchen, the common room, the basement, the chapel, the dormitory, the King's daughters' room, and the attic were refurbished and outfitted with artifacts that created an image and feeling reminiscent of the original house.

During the summer, costumed interpreters and artisans host live demonstrations showcasing 17th century craftmaking. In addition, the house and barn are surrounded by gardens. The Glade and the Poetry Path hosts indigenous plants and shrubs. The Farmhouse Gardens re-create a 17th-century vegetable garden. The Sharecroppers' garden honours the women of the Congregation of Notre Dame. These gardens add an horticultural element to the museum.

== Collections ==
The Maison Saint-Gabriel museum hosts over 15,000 artifacts. The 17th-century house and the 18th-century barn hold a collection that helps re-create rural living in New France, using objects dating from the 17th century onwards. There are many original objects, while others are reproductions based on drawings conserved from the 17th century. The collection includes domestic objects (lighting and appliances), religious clothing and accessories, furniture from homes and churches, materials of correspondence (letters and books), religious and decorative art, and finally textile, construction, agricultural and trade tools.

== Expansion ==
On November 1, 2010, the Jeanne-Leber house was officially incorporated into the Maison Saint-Gabriel Museum as the Catherine-Crolo pavilion. This building houses the gift shop, which has a tea room overlooking a terrace and which promotes local artisans. It also contains a reception area and a room for cultural activities.

The cost of the project was absorbed in part by the Governments of Canada and of Quebec. The ministries support this project as a way of educating visitors by preserving the heritage of Marguerite Bourgeoys and the Congregation of Notre Dame of Montreal.

== Affiliations ==
The museum is affiliated with: CMA, CHIN, and Virtual Museum of Canada.
