= Jacques Le Ber =

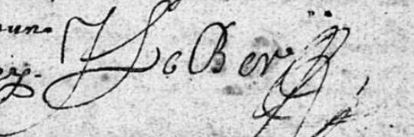
- Born: c. 1633 parish of Pistre, Diocese of Rouen
- Died: November 25, 1706 (aged 72–73); Montreal
- Resting place: Montreal; 45°30′32″N 73°33′15″W
- Citizenship: New France
- Spouse: Jeanne Le Moyne
- Children: Jeanne Le Ber
- Parent(s): Colette Cavelier and Robert Le Ber

Jacques Le Ber (c. 1633 – 25 November 1706) was a merchant and seigneur in Montreal, New France. In 1686 he was ennobled by Louis XIV and took the title Jacques Le Ber de Saint-Paul de Senneville, based on his hometown of Senneville-sur-Fécamp.

== Biography ==
Jacques Le Ber was born in c. 1633 in the parish of Pistre, Diocese of Rouen, son of Robert Le Ber and Colette Cavelier. He came to Canada in 1657 from France as a soldier but was mainly a businessman after his arrival. On January 7, 1658, he married Jeanne Le Moyne, the sister of Charles le Moyne de Longueuil et de Châteauguay and they became successful partners in the fur trade and the mercantile trade. He engaged in the cod fisheries, in trade with the West Indies, was one of the first men to send staves and sheathing to France, and experimented with the transplanting of European fruit trees.

Le Ber's wealth made him one of the most influential people of the time. For example, Governor General Frontenac sought his advice on important matters concerning trade and the welfare of the colony. Jacques Le Ber was ennobled in 1696.

In 1686, he built a stone mill on the Island of Montreal near the Ottawa River to provide the inhabitants of that area with a shelter in case of attack by the Five Nations. In 1693, he joined a war party of 300 Canadians, 100 soldiers, and 230 Indians that attacked the Mohawks in their own territory.

== Family ==
Le Ber came to Canada in 1657 and took up residence in Montreal. A brother, François, also settled there around the same time, and a sister, Marie, became an Ursuline nun in Quebec. Le Ber's wife had died November 8, 1682, and two sons had also predeceased him: Louis, Sieur de Saint-Paul, who died in the early 1690s in La Rochelle where he had acted as his father's business agent, and Jean-Vincent, Sieur Du Chesne, fatally wounded during an encounter with an English and Iroquois war party near Fort Chambly in 1691. Three children survived their father: Jeanne Le Ber, Pierre, and Jacques, Sieur de Senneville.

His daughter, Jeanne le Ber, used her inheritance to further the work of the Catholic Church in Montreal. Le Ber was buried in the church of the sisters of the Congregation of Notre Dame, the place where his famous recluse daughter lived and which she had largely funded.

== Honours ==
The village of Senneville, Quebec on the island of Montreal, is named for him.
