= Poussay =

- Commune
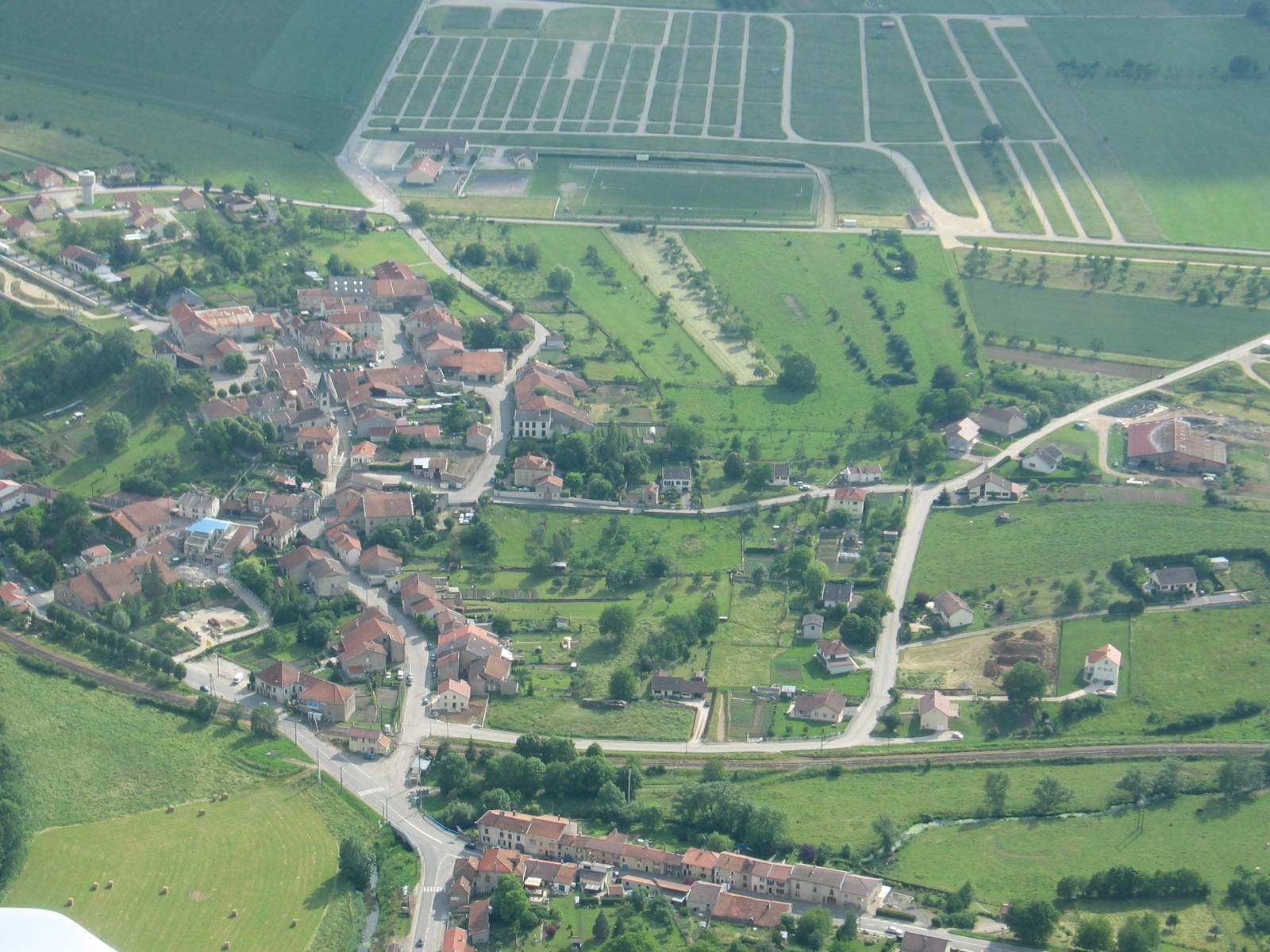
- A general view of Poussay

- Coat of arms
- Location of Poussay
- Location within France Location within Grand Est
- Coordinates: 48°19′17″N 6°07′28″E
- Country: France
- Region: Grand Est
- Department: Vosges
- Arrondissement: Neufchâteau
- Canton: Mirecourt
- Intercommunality: CC Mirecourt Dompaire

Government
  - Mayor (2020–2026): Philippe Larcher
- Area^{1}: 8.69 km^{2} (3.36 sq mi)
- Elevation: 295 m (968 ft)
- Highest elevation: 327 m (1,073 ft)
- Lowest elevation: 256 m (840 ft)
- Population (2023): 653
  - Density: 75.1/km^{2} (195/sq mi)
- Time zone: UTC+01:00 (CET)
  - Summer (DST): UTC+02:00 (CEST)
- INSEE/Postal code: 88357 /88500
- ^{1} French Land Register data, which excludes lakes, ponds, glaciers > 1 km^{2} (0.386 sq mi or 247 acres) and river estuaries.

Poussay (French pronunciation: [pusɛ]) is a commune in the Vosges department in Grand Est in northeastern France.

Inhabitants are called Porsuavitains (from the Latin version of Poussay, Portus Suavis).

== Geography ==
The commune is positioned on the plain that adjoins the Vosges. The countryside is diverse, combining a large number of residual hillocks with the valley of the River Madon. The village itself is sited on a raised shelf on the left bank of the river in the Madon valley, 2 kilometres (1 mi) to the north of Mirecourt. It overlooks a meandering section of river set in a richly watered arboreal tapestry of that includes willow hedges, poplars and alder.

== History ==
It was in the village, dominating from its limestone outcrop the Madon Valley, and also positioned across the old road from Nancy, that the great essayist Montaigne stayed around 1580 before he proceeded to Plombières en route for Italy.

Poussay has a rich history and each epoch has left traces, such as the ancient Roman road and the Merovingian era cemetery.

The Bishop of Toul between 996 and 1019 was a man named Berthold who founded a Benedictine monastery here. It was the fourth such foundation in Lorraine, after similar foundations at Remiremont, Épinal et Bouxières-aux-Dames. The monastery later became the Chapiter of Poussay, a form of béguinage for unmarried pious noblewomen.

In 1598, with the energetic support of the curé of nearby Mattaincourt, Peter Fourier (who was later canonised) and thanks to Catherine of Fresnel and Judith of Aspremont, two cannonesses of the Poussay Chapter, the village welcomed its first girls' school 'for rich and poor girls alike' ('tant pauvres que riches'). The Blessed Alix Le Clerc and her colleagues imparted the necessary elements of a good education to young girls: this initiative inspired the establishment of a network of similar schools across Lorraine.

== See also ==
- Communes of the Vosges department
