= Recluse Sisters =

The Recluse Sisters (RM) are a congregation of religious sisters in the Roman Catholic Church. The congregation was founded in 1943, in Alberta, Canada, by Rita Renaud, Jeannette Roy and the Louis-Marie Parent, OMI, as Les Recluses Missionaires ("the missionary recluses"). The sisters practise perpetual adoration of the Eucharist, with an accent on prayer, silence and solitude in a cloistered way of life.

Their inspiration is the recluse Jeanne Le Ber (1662–1714), who lived in the early days of Montreal. Today's Recluse Sisters live in the Monastery of the Annunciation, in Montreal, Quebec.

== Foundress ==
Rita Renaud was born 22 October 22 in Montreal and baptized two days later at the Church of St. John the Baptist. She obtained her degree from the Collège Marguerite Bourgeoys in 1939. She entered the Servants of the Blessed Sacrament in Quebec as a postulant, but left after five months due to health problems. She and Jeannette Roy established a hermitage in a stable at the Renaud family property.
