= Peter Fourier =

French Roman Catholic saint

Saint Peter Fourier
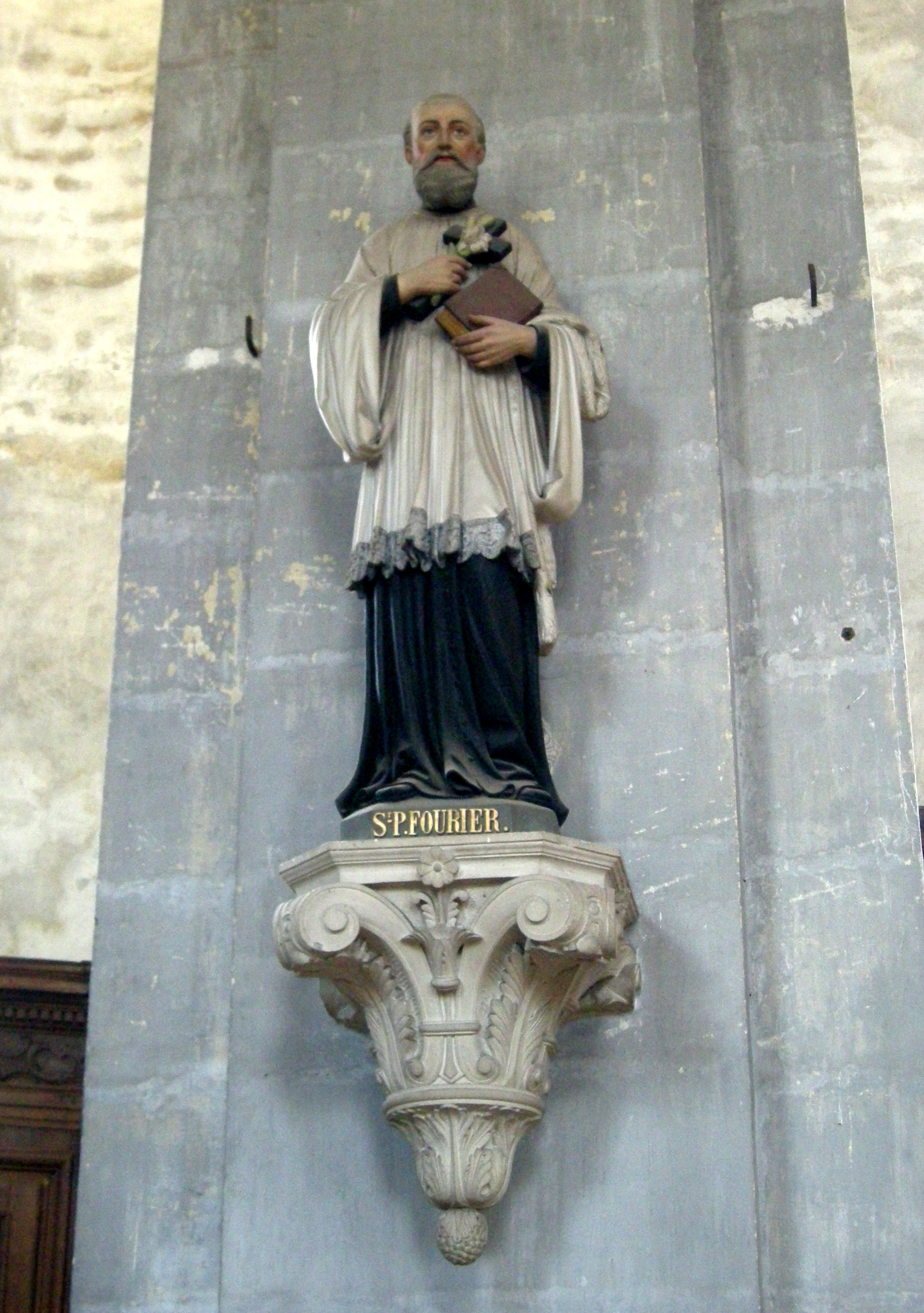
- Polychromed 18th-century statue in the former Abbey Church of Moyenmoutier, Vosges, France

Canon Regular and Religious founder
- Born: 30 November 1565; Mirecourt, Duchy of Lorraine, Holy Roman Empire
- Died: 9 December 1640 (aged 75); Gray, County of Burgundy, Holy Roman Empire
- Venerated in: Roman Catholic Church (Diocese of Nancy, Order of Canons Regular and the Canonesses Regular of Notre-Dame)
- Beatified: 1730, Rome, Papal States, by Pope Benedict XIII
- Canonized: 1897, Rome, Kingdom of Italy, by Pope Leo XIII
- Feast: 9 December
- Attributes: Chaplet, pictures of the Virgin Mary

Peter Fourier (French: Pierre Fourier, pronounced [fuʁje]; 30 November 1565 – 9 December 1640) was a French canon regular who is honored as a saint in the Roman Catholic Church. Foregoing offers of high office, he served for many years as a pastor in the village of Mattaincourt in the Vosges. He was a strong proponent of free education and also helped to found a religious congregation of canonesses regular dedicated to the care of poor children, developing a new pedagogy for this.

== Early life ==
Fourier was born on 30 November 1565 in the village of Mirecourt, in what was then the Duchy of Lorraine, a part of the Holy Roman Empire (now the French department of Vosges), which was a bulwark of the Catholic Counter-Reformation. He was the eldest of the three sons of a cloth merchant and his wife, who were faithful Catholics. At the age of 15, his father enrolled him in the new Jesuit University of Pont-à-Mousson (eventually merged into the University of Lorraine).

In 1585 Fourier was admitted to the novitiate of the canons regular of the Abbey of Chaumousey, where he made his profession of vows two years later. He was ordained a priest at Trier, at the age of 23, on 24 February 1589. His abbot then sent him back to the University of Pont-à-Mousson to further his studies. He became a scholastic theologian who knew the Summa Theologica by heart, and earned the great respect of both the university officials and the Count-Bishop of Metz, who offered him a high ecclesiastical post. Fourier chose, instead, to return to his abbey.

After his return to his canonical community, however, he was subjected to two years of hostility and abuse by his less fervent fellow canons, including. by some accounts, attempted poisoning. He chose not to confront his abbot with the situation and accepted this persecution patiently. The care of local parishes in that region of France was routinely entrusted to the many abbeys and priories of canons. In 1597, when his abbot was assigning him a post, Fourier passed over two prestigious options and accepted the post of vicar of the parish of Mattaincourt in order to combat the indifference to religion widespread in the town, and to counter nascent Calvinism in the area. He went on to spend the next twenty years of his life serving its people.

To this end, Fourier instituted two major reforms. The first of these was to improve the financial lives of his community by setting up a community bank, from which the townspeople could borrow without interest. His motto in serving the parish was to feed only one person was to of use to all. His second innovation was in his preaching style, where he employed dialogues with small groups of his parishioners to explain better their Catholic faith to them. He had his pupils engage in dialectics on Sundays on the various virtues and vices in practice by the congregation. This style proved immensely successful.

Fourier led an extremely ascetic way of life while serving the people of his parish. He would spend much of the night in prayer. He refused the services of a housekeeper, even when his own stepmother offered to provide his care. His severe self-denial enabled him to direct much of the income of the parish to the needy of the town. He himself would often spend the night nursing the sick of the town.

== Reformer and founder ==
The success of Fourier's pastorate in inspiring his flock to a greater fidelity to the Catholic faith was brought to the attention of the local bishops of the region. They prevailed upon him to go about to different parishes to preach to the people. He did so and, as a result of seeing the situation of the populace throughout the region, he was struck by the depths of their ignorance and superstition.

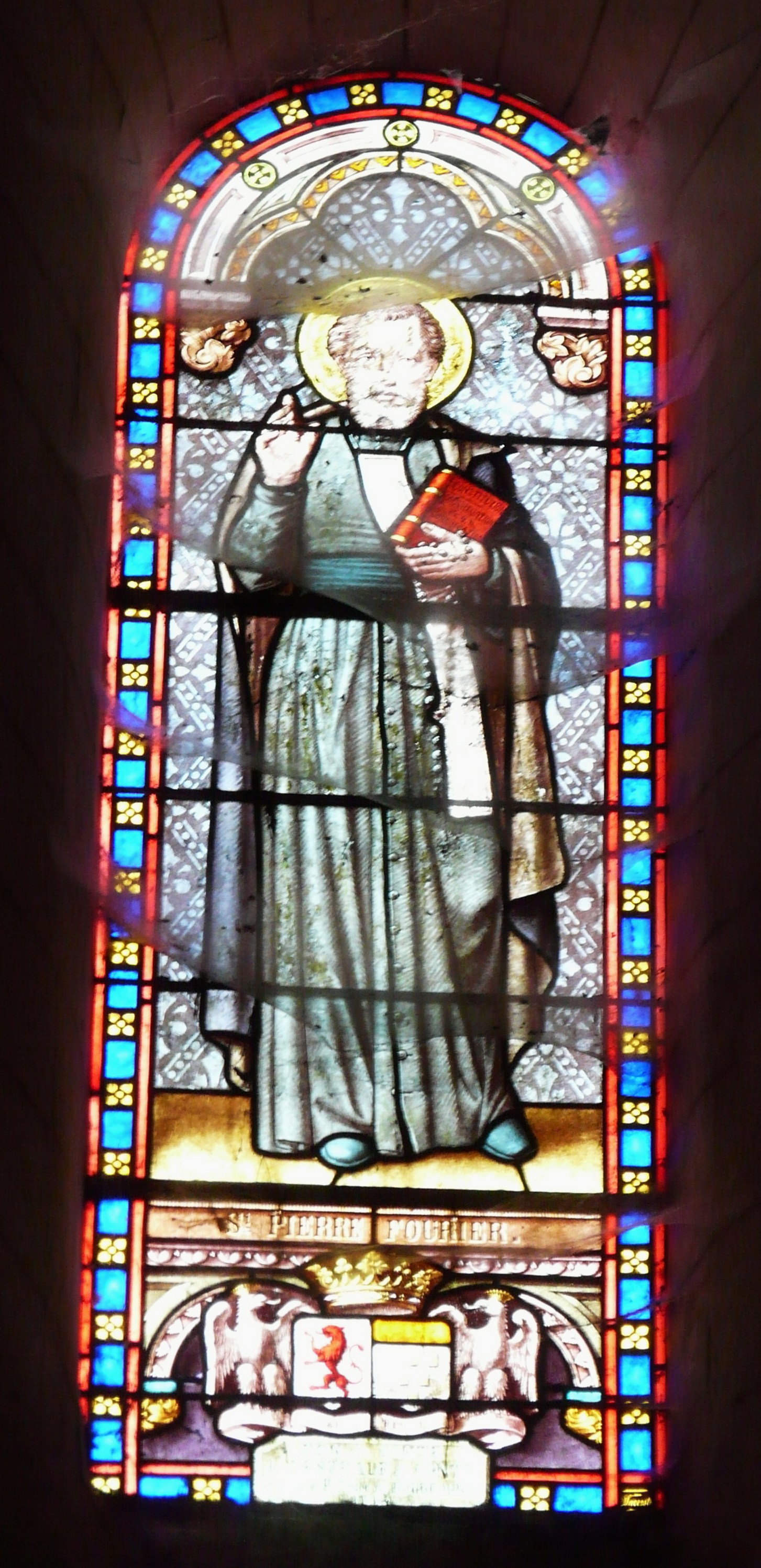
Stained glass window depicting St. Peter Fourier, C.R.S.A., with the white sarozium of a canon regular Church of Saint Martin Coulaures, Dordogne, France

Together with Alix Le Clerc, in 1597, Fourier founded the Congregation of Notre Dame of Canonesses Regular of St. Augustine, who were committed to the free education of children, taking a fourth vow to that goal. Soon there were six schools run by his spiritual daughters. He played an active role in their education, being credited with the invention of the blackboard and its use in the classroom, as well as the division of students into classes of a similar level of instruction. By the time of his death, the number of schools run by the canonesses had grown to forty. They went on to spread their work throughout France, Germany and England.

Fourier's vision also extended to the life of his own Order. He sought to revive a spirit of fervor and discipline in the communities of the canons regular. In 1621 the bishop of Toul, Jean des Porcellets, chose him to organize the canonical communities in his diocese. He therefore entrusted the ancient Abbey of St. Remy in that city to Fourier and six companions, where they could lead the way of life he envisioned. Within four years, eight houses of the Order had embraced his reform. In 1625 they were formed into a new congregation of all the priories of canons in the duchy. To reinforce the reform, any canons who wished to join had to undergo a new novitiate and profession of vows. Otherwise they could retire with a pension from the canonical life. On 11 February 1628 they were officially established as the Congregation of Our Savior by the Holy See, as a reformed congregation of the Regular Canons of Lorraine.

The method of reform established by Fourier served as a model for the reform of the canons regular in the Kingdom of France, where, with the support of Cardinal Rochefoucauld, the Congregation of France was established with these same conditions. In 1625 Fourier was charged with preaching to the people of the Principality of Salm-Salm, which had embraced Calvinism. Within six months he had succeeded in re-establishing Catholicism in the area.

Fourier himself was elected as Abbot General of the congregation in 1632. He hoped to guide his fellow canons to caring for children, as the canonesses were doing. This vision never took root among the men, however.

After the invasion by the Kingdom of France of the Duchy of Lorraine in 1632 under Cardinal Richelieu, Fourier refused to swear an oath of loyalty to King Louis XIII. Thus he and his community were forced to flee their monastery in 1636, taking refuge in the town of Gray in the neighboring County of Burgundy. Fourier and the canons with him were occupied in that city nursing plague victims. It was there that he died on 9 December 1640.

== Veneration ==
Peter Fourier was beatified by Pope Benedict XIII in 1730 and canonized by Pope Leo XIII in 1897. His feast day is celebrated in the Roman Catholic Church on 9 December, the anniversary of his death.

Fourier is honored by a statue of him in St. Peter's Basilica among the founders of religious orders.

== Legacy ==
The vision of Fourier was exported to Canada in 1654 by Marguerite Bourgeoys, who was the president of a sodality of volunteers associated with the work of the cloistered canonesses. Moving to New France at the invitation of its governor, she became one of the early founders of the new colony. There she established the Congregation of Notre Dame of Montreal, which was the first to provide education to the children of the colonists, as well as to the Native American children. Her work has been highly successful both there and in the United States of America.
