= Congregation of Notre Dame of Montreal =

Roman Catholic religious congregation

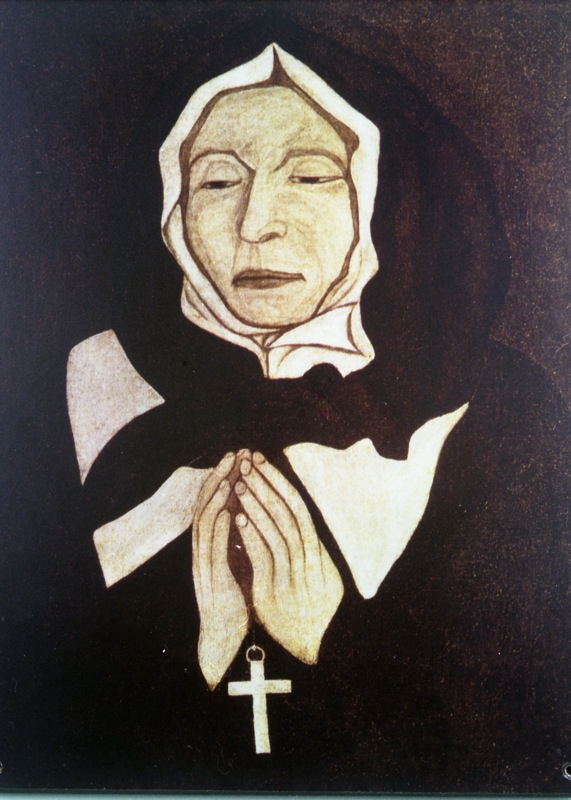
La Venerable Marguerite Bourgeoys by Pierre Le Ber in the possession of the Sisters of the Congregation of Notre Dame, Montreal

The Congrégation de Notre Dame (CND) is a religious community for women founded in 1658 in Ville Marie (Montreal), in the colony of New France, now part of Canada. It was established by Marguerite Bourgeoys, who was recruited in France to create a religious community in Ville Marie. She developed a congregation for women that was not cloistered; the sisters were allowed to live and work outside the convent. The congregation held an important role in the development of New France, as it supported women and girls in the colony and offered roles for them outside the home.

It also founded a boarding school for girls' education, and watched over the filles du roi, women immigrants whose passage to the colony was paid by the Crown, which wished to encourage marriages and the development of families in the colony. Some filles de roi and sisters served as missionaries to the First Nations peoples. The community's motherhouse has been based in Montreal for more than 350 years. Marguerite Bourgeoys was canonized in 1982 by the Catholic Church and is Canada's first woman saint.

== Origins of the Congregation De Notre Dame ==
The Congrégation Notre-Dame was a women's religious order created in France by Pierre Fourier and Alix Le Clerc, committed to education. Following a spiritual experience in 1640 and a long search for a place within the more conventional contemplative, cloistered women's religious communities, Bourgeoys joined the externe Congregation at Troyes. As Bourgeoys helped in the Congregation of Notre Dame, she had a vision of a new kind of religious community for women, who would be active and among those who needed their help, and not cloistered in a convent. She modeled it after that of the Canonesses of Mattaincourt.

In 1653, Paul de Chomedey de Maisonneuve, founder of Ville Marie (Montreal), visited Troyes, and invited Bourgeoys to Ville Marie to teach. She sailed from France in June of that year, and upon arrival devoted her time to a variety of works of mercy. She opened her first school in April 1657, but soon returned to France to recruit assistants; four companions joined her.

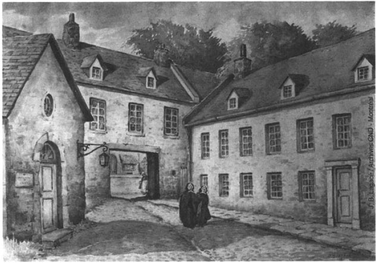
The Congregation of Notre Dame of Montreal convent from rue Saint-Jean-Baptiste, ca. 1684–1768, Montreal, Quebec

== Location ==
By 1665, the congregation consisted of Bourgeoys and three other sisters living in Montreal; they taught in a stone building known as the "stable school", established in 1658. The Convent was near the corner of Notre-Dame and Saint Paul Street, in what is now known as Old Montreal. As revealed by its architectural plans, the early convent was a private space, secluded from the public life of Montreal. The convent was placed deeply within its own terrain, and its separation from public life was protected by the Hôtel Dieu and the walls that surrounded it. The sisters were provided protection and seclusion whilst surrounded by the colony's merchants and more rowdy inhabitants, such as soldiers and labourers.

=== Maison Saint-Gabriel ===
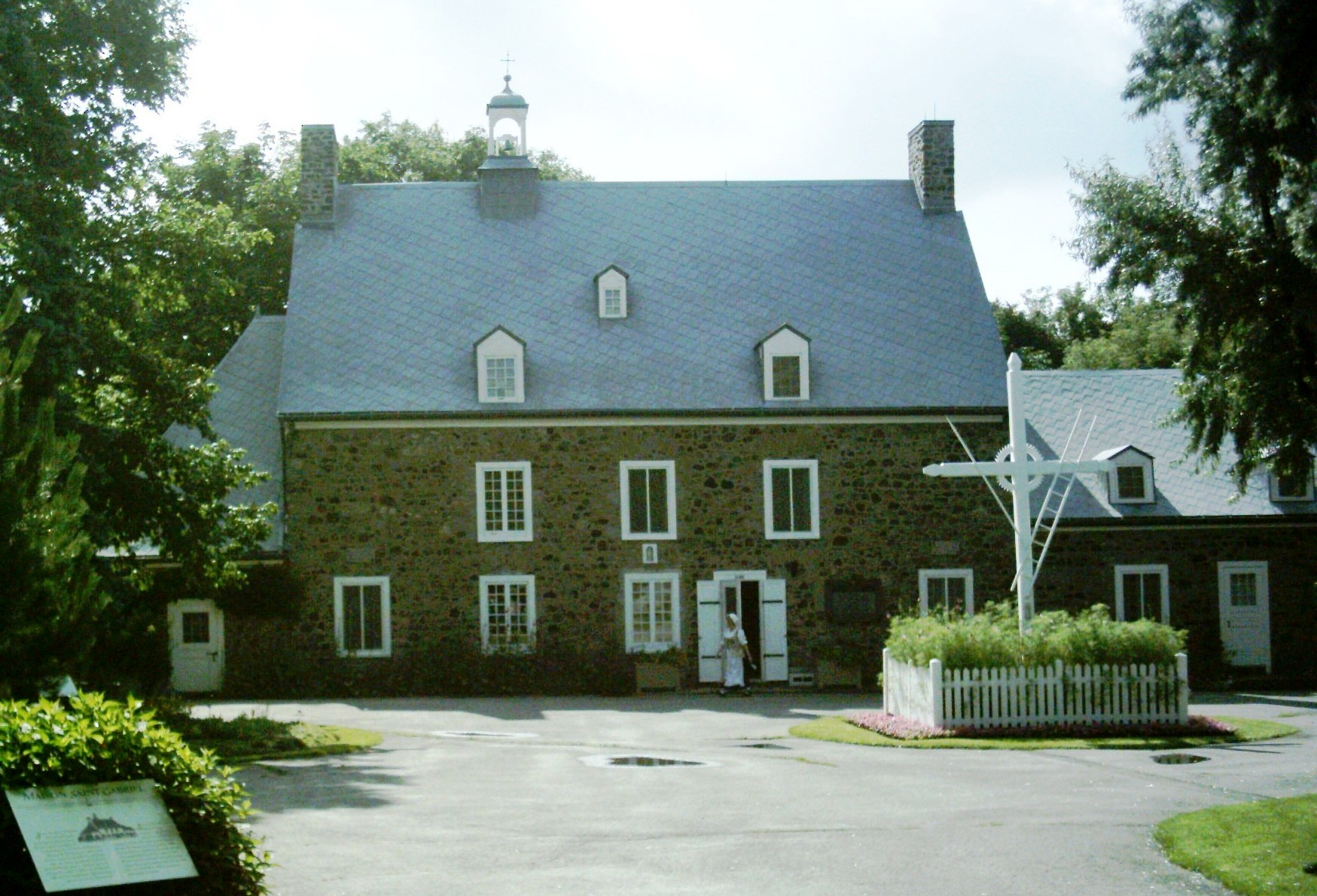
The Maison Saint-Gabriel today

In October 1662, Maisonneuve conceded land in Pointe-Saint-Charles to Bourgeoys in order to establish a farm that would feed the congregation and support its work. In 1668, Bourgeoys purchased the adjoining Maison Saint-Gabriel farm, which the sisters of the Congrégation de Notre-Dame operated for nearly 300 years. It was a temporary home for some of the King's Wards, also called the King's Daughters, or filles du roi. On the property, the sisters produced food and products to support the Congrégation de Notre-Dame, new settlers, and others in need.

Today the property has been developed as a living museum of farming and historic times. The property, outbuildings and grounds have been restored and expanded. The museum houses some 15,000 artifacts recreating the feel of the house from the 17th and 18th century.

The congregation received civil recognition in 1671 from King Louis XIV and was granted official status by the Catholic Church in 1698. This was 40 years after its founding and two years before the death of Marguerite Bourgeoys.

In 1675 Bourgeoys built a chapel dedicated to Notre Dame de Bon Secours. To ensure greater freedom of action for her congregation, Bourgeoys founded an uncloistered community, its members bound by simple vows. They generally instructed children and aided the pastors in the various parishes where convents of the order had been established. Although the community had received the approbation of François de Laval, Bishop of Quebec, Bourgeoys wanted to have the character of non-enclosure and simple vows embodied in a rule. To confer with the bishop, who was in France, she undertook a third journey to Europe. After returning the next year, she resisted numerous attempts made in the next few years to merge her new order with the cloistered Ursulines, or otherwise to change its original character.

Notre Dame houses were opened at Pointe-aux-Trembles, near Montreal, at Lachine, at Champlain and Château Richer. In 1685 a mission was established at Sainte Famille on the Island of Orléans.

== Controversy of the uncloistered ==
The difficulties of establishing a non-cloistered religious order for women in 17th century New France were considerable. At the time, the church preferred the regimen of the cloistered nun behind the walls of a convent. Before 1698, the first two bishops of Quebec, François de Laval and Jean-Baptiste de La Croix de Chevrières de Saint-Vallier, were ambivalent about the congregation.

They did not understand the need to remain uncloistered. But they recognized that the colony needed teachers who could travel. They counted on Bourgeoys and her sisters to reach the small and dispersed population of New France (Quebec) in these early years. The sisters reached children in parishes between Quebec and Montreal and beyond. If women were to be the educators, Laval and Saint-Vallier reluctantly recognized that the sisters needed to be able to travel and live outside a convent. The sisters were allowed to live a relatively uncloistered life.

By 1694 Bishop Saint-Vallier sent the congregation a new constitution that imposed more restrictions. Having enjoyed certain freedoms for approximately forty years, the sisters resisted more restrictive and conventional rules. The constitution afforded the congregation the right to officially declare vows, necessary to gain legitimacy in the frontier society and grow as an organization. It required the sisters to be obedient to and report directly to the bishop of Quebec. The document also required them to take solemn vows, attacked their more secular activities in the convent, and instituted the requirement of a dowry to be donated by new sisters. After a few years' resistance, in 1698 the sisters had to accept Saint-Vallier's constitution; it had traditional requirements that had long been enforced in Europe.

== After Saint-Vallier's constitution ==
The nuns were to take vows, including a traditional one of stability. This meant that women could not leave the convent at will. The constitution created a hierarchical divide, also traditional, between the women who had taken their vows and those who had not. The bishop imposed payment of a dowry by new recruits. In practice, it prevented attracting women of the lower classes, whose families generally did not have money to contribute.

While the new constitution enforced more traditional conditions, the sisters of the CND maintained some seventeenth-century practices. Many of them continued to teach, travel and lend their expertise to other parishes across New France.

== Role of Congregation Sisters in the education of women and Île Royale ==
Schools were essentially administered by the church. Cultivation of the human heart was considered the first step in the education process. Christian moral principles were taught to the children who attended religious schools in New France. Eighteenth-century formal education was intended to produce a civilized Christian population. Nearly all the teachers in New France belonged to the clergy, as evidenced by the 1727 ordinance issued in Canada. This document stated that all teachers in the colony needed approval from the Bishop of Quebec. Teachers' methods and material were closely monitored by their parish's priest.

At this time there was no formal education system in the colony of Île Royale. Founded in 1713, Île Royale comprised French-occupied areas of Nova Scotia and Prince Edward Island. While preparing the colony's establishment in 1713, the minister of the marine never once discussed the establishment of schools. He believed that the Récollets missionaries would open colonial parish schools. By the mid-1720s, there were still no established schools in the community, but more than 300 children. Conflicting opinions between local and royal officials led locals to take the matter of education into their own hands. Imperial officials refused the commisonnaire-ordonnateur Mézy's demand to establish a public catholic school in Louisbourg.

Concerned about the ethic and moral teaching of girls, Mézy and other local officials turned to Montreal's Congrégation Notre Dame. The commissaire-ordonnateur suggested that a delegation of religious sisters from the Congrégation should be sent to help educate girls. Finally in 1727 Marguerite Roy and two sisters were sent from Montreal to oversee the teaching of girls in the colony. Very shortly after arriving, they established a school and took 22 girls under their wing. The bishops of Quebec saw this as an urgent cause, particularly Bishop Saint-Vallier showed great concern about the moral instruction and upbringing of girls raised in the colony. However, financial difficulties complicated the task, as the sisters needed to purchase a house in which they would teach. The sisters sold straw pallets to soldiers in order to supplement their income. The religious brothers were much wealthier, and their teaching benefited from more resources and superior infrastructure. Ile Royale was a poor religious community, low income, debt and budget issues were a consistent problem for the sisters of the Congrégation Notre-Dame well into 1753.

Despite the restricted the number of girls admitted by the sisters, many girls from the colony of Ile Royale were instructed successfully by sisters from the Congrégation Notre-Dame. Consistent with the era, instruction in morality and Christian ethics remained more important than education in reading and writing. Both female day students and boarders benefited from the school. Along with the religious obligations mandatory in all parish-run schools in New France, religious texts enabled girls to learn how to read and write. Some math was also taught, although limited. The education given to girls under the sisters of Congrégation Notre-Dame in Ile Royale was considered adequate by the standards of the era. Students of the school had to follow a consistent weekly schedule.

During the latter half of the nineteenth century, missions were established in various parishes of the provinces of Quebec, Ontario, Nova Scotia, New Brunswick, Prince Edward Island, and in the United States. Many academies and schools were also opened in the city of Montreal.

== Present day ==
In 1908 the Notre-Dame Congregation founded Notre Dame Ladies College, now known as Marianopolis College.

In 1926 Waterbury Catholic High School, a girls' high school in Waterbury, Connecticut was founded. In 1975, it was merged with Holy Cross High School (Connecticut), administered by the Congregation of Holy Cross. The building was renamed and served as the diocesan Sacred Heart High School. As of 2018, ten sisters of the congregation Notre Dame still ministered in the Waterbury area, in parishes, schools, a prison, and a hospital.

In 1981, a community was established in Troyes, Marguerite Bourgeoys' native city. A second community in France was formed in 1989 in Estissac, where the sisters established the Marguerite Bourgeoys Cultural Centre.

As of 2020, there were about 860 members of the congregation. The motherhouse is in Montreal.

In 2023, the Congregation announced that the estate on which the Villa Maria high school lies will be sold off, leaving the future of the school uncertain. The current lease ends in 2030, and the Congregation intends to put the land on sale the following year. The Congregation cited the falling number of nuns as one of the reasons behind its decision to sell. Proceeds would be spent on helping poor students at public elementary and secondary schools in Quebec. In 2024, Marianopolis purchased the property located at 4873 Westmount Avenue, home to its Westmount Campus, from the Congregation. In the same year, the Sisters also sold their building at 4120 Vendôme Avenue (near the border between Notre-Dame-de-Grâce and Westmount) to the Selwyn House School.

== See also ==
- Peter Fourier
- Maison Saint-Gabriel
- François de Laval
- Jean-Baptiste de La Croix de Chevrières de Saint-Vallier

== Sources ==
- Gray, Colleen (2007). The Congrégation de Notre-Dame, Superiors, and the Paradox of Power, 1693-1796. Montreal: McGill-Queen's University Press.
- Simpson, Patricia (2005). Marguerite Bourgeoys and the Congregation of Notre Dame, 1665-1700. Montreal: McGill-Queen's University Press.
