= Mattaincourt =

- Commune
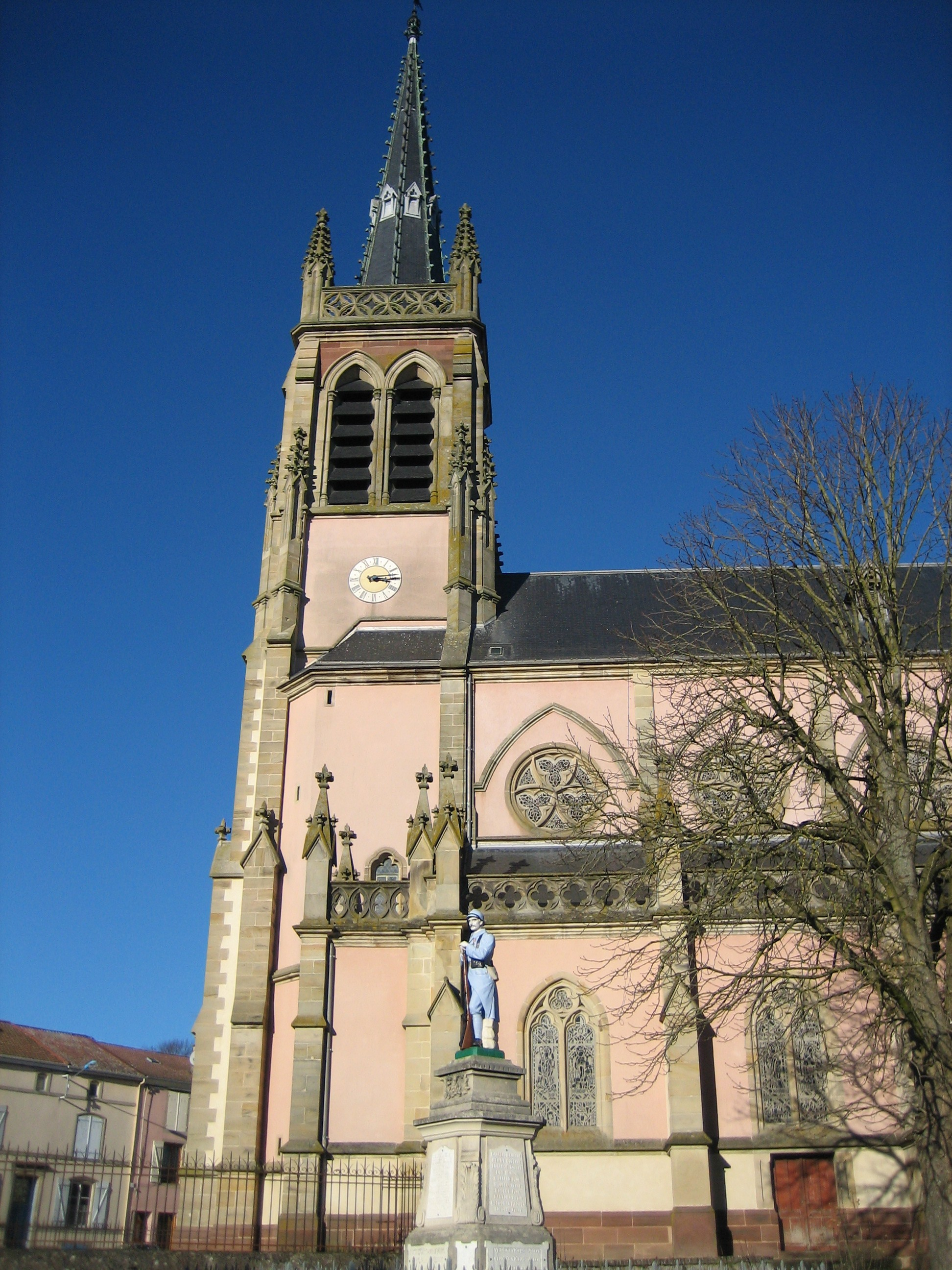
- The church in Mattaincourt

- Coat of arms
- Location of Mattaincourt
- Location within France Location within Grand Est
- Coordinates: 48°16′47″N 6°08′01″E
- Country: France
- Region: Grand Est
- Department: Vosges
- Arrondissement: Neufchâteau
- Canton: Mirecourt
- Intercommunality: CC Mirecourt Dompaire

Government
  - Mayor (2020–2026): Joris Huriot
- Area^{1}: 5.95 km^{2} (2.30 sq mi)
- Elevation: 284 m (932 ft)
- Highest elevation: 375 m (1,230 ft)
- Lowest elevation: 267 m (876 ft)
- Population (2023): 802
  - Density: 135/km^{2} (349/sq mi)
- Time zone: UTC+01:00 (CET)
  - Summer (DST): UTC+02:00 (CEST)
- INSEE/Postal code: 88292 /88500
- ^{1} French Land Register data, which excludes lakes, ponds, glaciers > 1 km^{2} (0.386 sq mi or 247 acres) and river estuaries.

Mattaincourt (French pronunciation: [matɛ̃kuʁ]) is a commune in the Vosges department in Grand Est in northeastern France.

Inhabitants are called Mattaincurtiens.

== Geography ==
Mattaincourt lies on the southern part of the Lorraine Plateau, in a wooded area of gentle hills known as the Vôge. It is some 15 kilometres (9 mi) to the east-northeast of Vittel and 25 kilometres (16 mi) west of Épinal. The river Madon flows through the commune on its way north to join the Moselle near Nancy.

== History ==
=== Etymology ===
The name Mattaincourt is a latinate one which comes from Martin Court, or the domain (Latin "curtis") of Martin. The Martin in question must have been part of the local Gallo-Roman establishment: the neighbouring village of Hymont is believed to have belonged to a Frank named Hindonis. The course of the Roman road connecting Langres with Metz runs through the commune a short distance to the west and north of the village where part of it doubles as the modern departmental road connecting Mattaincourt with the village of Mirecourt, beyond Hymont to the north.

=== Manufacturing ===
The waters of the Madon were formerly used for linen fulling (producing). Raw materials were purchased at the markets of Frankfurt or Strasbourg, and the linen cloth produced was sold not just in Savoy, but also in Burgundy, Switzerland and even in Flanders. The drapers of Mattaincourt, Mirecourt and Poussay formed themselves into a single grouping which became a commercially powerful corporation: the weavers' mark appeared on each item of cloth. The figure "4" which can still be seen on some of the doorways in the village is said to be the drapers' mark.

=== Personalities ===
Pierre Fourier (30 November 1565 - 9 December 1640), a leading apostle of the Counter-Reformation, was the parish priest responsible for Mattaincourt for two decades from 1597 (some source state 1595).

== See also ==
- Communes of the Vosges department
