= King's Daughters =

17th-century immigrants to New France

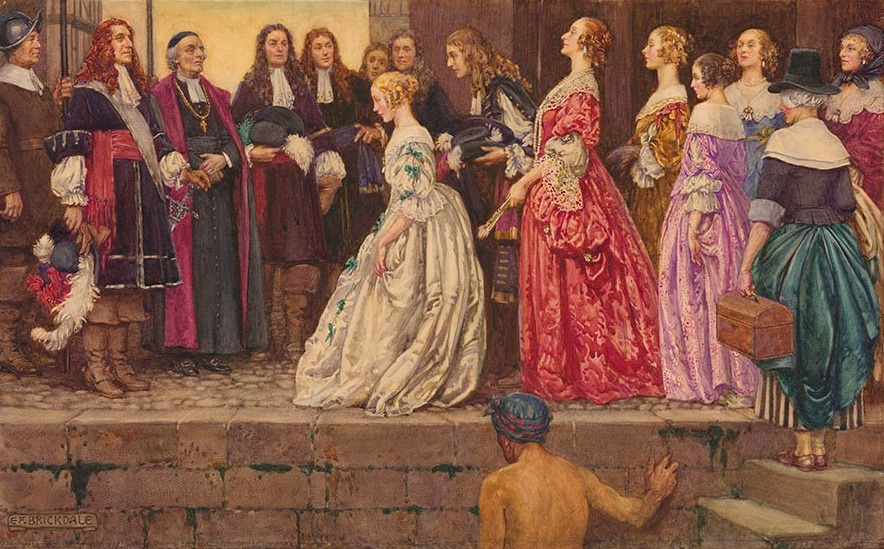
Jean Talon, Bishop François de Laval and several settlers welcome the King's Daughters upon their arrival. Painting by Eleanor Fortescue-Brickdale

The King's Daughters (French: filles du roi [fij dy ʁwa], or filles du roy in the spelling of the era) were the approximately 800 young French women who immigrated to New France between 1663 and 1673 as part of a program sponsored by King Louis XIV. The program was designed to boost New France's population both by encouraging Frenchmen to move to the New World, and by promoting marriage, family formation, and the birth of French children in the colony. The term refers to those women and girls who were recruited by the government and whose travel to the colony was paid for by the king. They were also occasionally known as the King's Wards.

== Origins ==
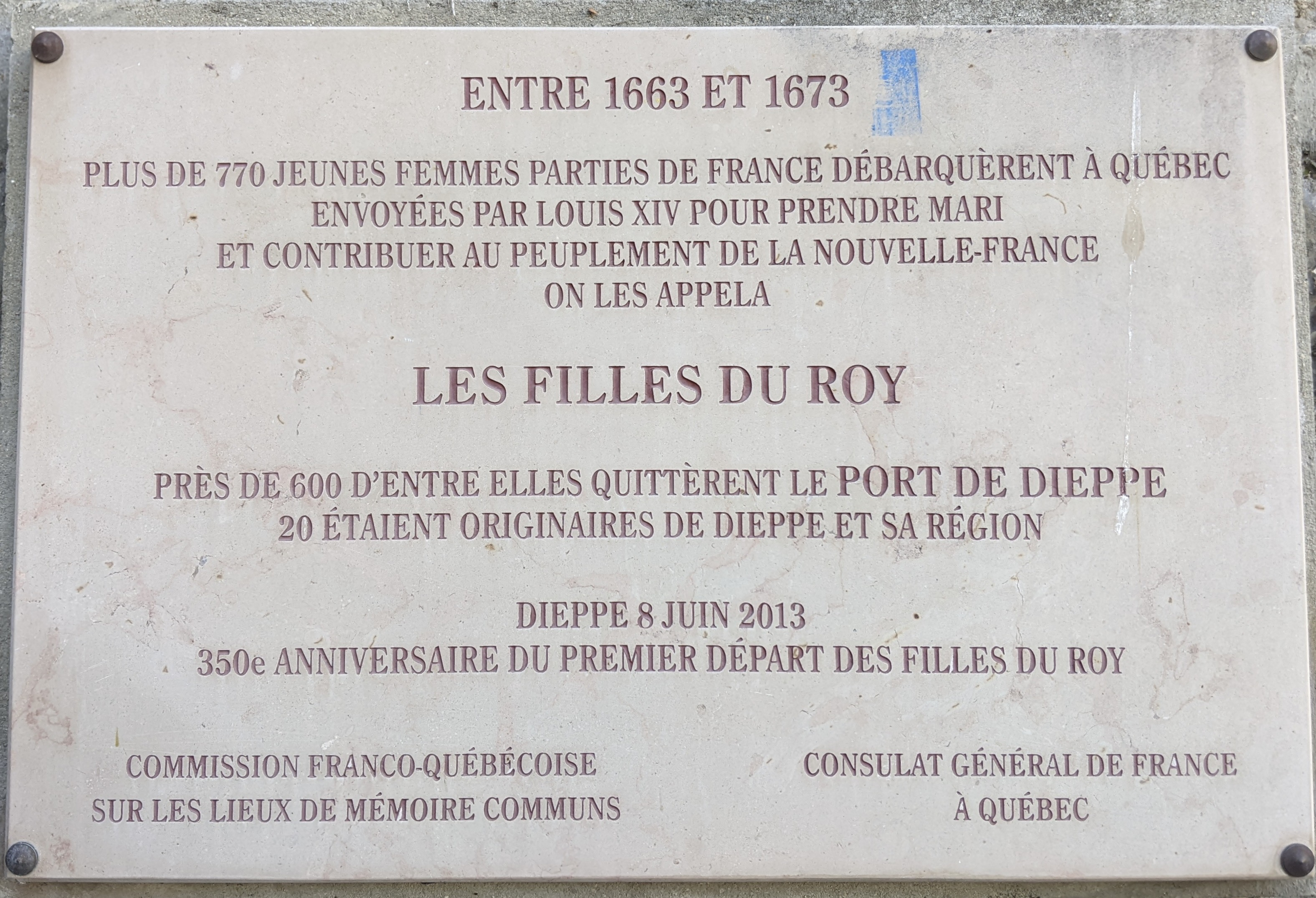
Commemorative plaque in Dieppe of the departure of the Filles du Roy, 1663–1673

Age distribution of the filles du roi 1663–1673; most were young women aged between 16 and 25
1. 12–15 (10.0%)
2. 16–25 (57.0%)
3. 26 and older (22.0%)
4. Unknown (11.0%)

New France, at its start, was populated mostly by men: soldiers, fur traders, and missionary priests. Settlers began to develop farms and by the mid-17th century, there was a severe imbalance between single men and women in New France. The small number of female immigrants had to pay their own passage, and few single women wanted to leave home to move and settle in the harsh climate and conditions of New France. At the same time, officials noted the population growth of the competing English colonies, which had more families, and they worried about France's ability to maintain its territorial claims in the New World.

To increase the French population and the number of families, the Intendant of New France, Jean Talon, proposed that the king sponsor passage of at least 500 women. The king agreed, and eventually, nearly twice the number were recruited. They were predominantly between the ages of 12 and 25, and many had to supply a letter of reference from their parish priest before they would be chosen for immigration to New France. They were intended to marry men in the colony in order to establish families and more farms.

Marguerite Bourgeoys was the first person to use the expression filles du roi in her writings. A distinction was made between King's Daughters, who were transported to New France and received a dowry at the king's expense, and women who emigrated voluntarily using their own money. Other historians used chronological frameworks to determine who could be called a fille du roi. Research by the historical demographer Yves Landry determines that there were in total about 770 to 850 filles du roi who settled in New France between 1663 and 1673.

The title "King's Daughters" was meant to imply state patronage, not royal or noble parentage; most of the women recruited were commoners of humble birth. As a fille du roi, a woman received the king's support in several ways. The king paid one hundred livres to the French East India Company for each woman's crossing, as well as furnishing her trousseau. The Crown also paid a dowry for each woman; this was originally set at four hundred livres, but as the Treasury could not spare such an expense, many were simply paid in kind.

Those chosen to be among the filles du roi and allowed to emigrate to New France were held to scrupulous standards, which were based on their "moral calibre" and whether they were physically fit enough to survive the hard work demanded by life as a colonist. The colonial officials sent several of the filles du roi back to France because they were deemed below the standards set out by the king and the intendant of New France.

As was the case for most emigrants who went from France to New France, 80 per cent of the filles du roi were from Paris, Normandy and the western regions. Almost half were from the Paris area, 16 per cent from Normandy and 13 per cent from western France. Most came from urban areas, with the Hôpital-Général de Paris and the Saint-Sulpice parish being big contributors. Many were orphans with meagre personal possessions, and with a relatively low level of literacy. Socially, the young women came from different backgrounds but were all very poor. They might have been from an elite family that had lost its fortune, or from a large family with children "to spare." Officials usually matched women of higher birth with officers or gentlemen living in the colony, sometimes in the hopes that the nobles would marry the young women and be encouraged to stay in Canada rather than return to France. A few women came from other European countries, including Germany, England, and Portugal.

== Integration into New French society ==
Year	Arrivals
1663	36
1664	1
1665	80–100
1666	0
1667	109
1668	80
1669	149
1670	c. 165
1671	150
1672	0
1673	60
Total	832–852

The women disembarked in Quebec City, Trois-Rivières, and Montreal. After their arrival, their time to find husbands varied greatly. For some, it was as short as a few months, while others took two or three years before finding an appropriate husband. For the process of choosing a husband, and the marriage, most couples would officially get engaged in church, with their priest and witnesses present. Then, some couples went in front of the notary, to sign a marriage contract. Marriages were celebrated by the priest, usually in the woman's parish of residence. While the marriage banns customarily were to be published three times before a wedding could take place, the colony's need for women to marry quickly led to few filles du roi having marriage banns announced. It is known that 737 of these filles du roi were married in New France.

The marriage contracts represented a protection for the women, both in terms of financial security if anything were to happen to them or their husband, and in terms of having the liberty to annul the promise of marriage if the man they had chosen proved incompatible. A substantial number of the filles du roi who arrived in New France between 1669 and 1671 cancelled marriage contracts; perhaps the dowry they had received made them disinclined to retain a fiancé with whom they found themselves dissatisfied.

An early problem in recruitment was the women's adjustment to the new agricultural life. As Saint Marie de L'Incarnation wrote, the filles du roi were mostly town girls, and only a few knew how to do manual farm work. This problem remained but, in later years, more rural girls were recruited.

There were approximately 300 recruits who did not marry in New France. Some had a change of heart before embarking from the ports of Normandy and never left, while some died on the journey. Others returned to France to marry, and a few remained single.

=== Integration in Ville-Marie ===
Prior to the King's Daughters, the women who immigrated to Ville-Marie, otherwise known as Montreal, had been recruited by the Société Notre-Dame de Montréal founded in 1641 in Paris. Amongst these women were Jeanne Mance and Marguerite Bourgeoys. When the first filles du roi arrived in Montreal, they were taken in by Bourgeoys. Initially, there were no comfortable lodgings to receive them, but in 1668 Bourgeoys procured the Maison Saint-Gabriel, a large farmhouse in which to house them.

=== End of recruitment and growth of the settlement ===
The program was a resounding success. It was reported that in 1670, most of the women who had arrived the previous year, 1669, were already pregnant and by 1671, a total of nearly 700 children were born to the filles du roi. The colony was expected to gain population self-sufficiency soon afterward.

By the end of 1671, Talon suggested that it would not be necessary to sponsor the passage of girls for the next year, and the king accepted his advice. The migration briefly resumed in 1673, when the king sent 60 more girls at the request of Buade de Frontenac, the new governor, but that was the last under the Crown's sponsorship. Of the approximately 835 marriages of immigrants in the colony during this period, 774 included a fille du roi. By 1672, the population of New France had increased to 6,700, from 3,200 in 1663.

Two-thirds of all Canadians of French descent can trace their lineage to one of the filles du roi.

== Rumors and legends ==
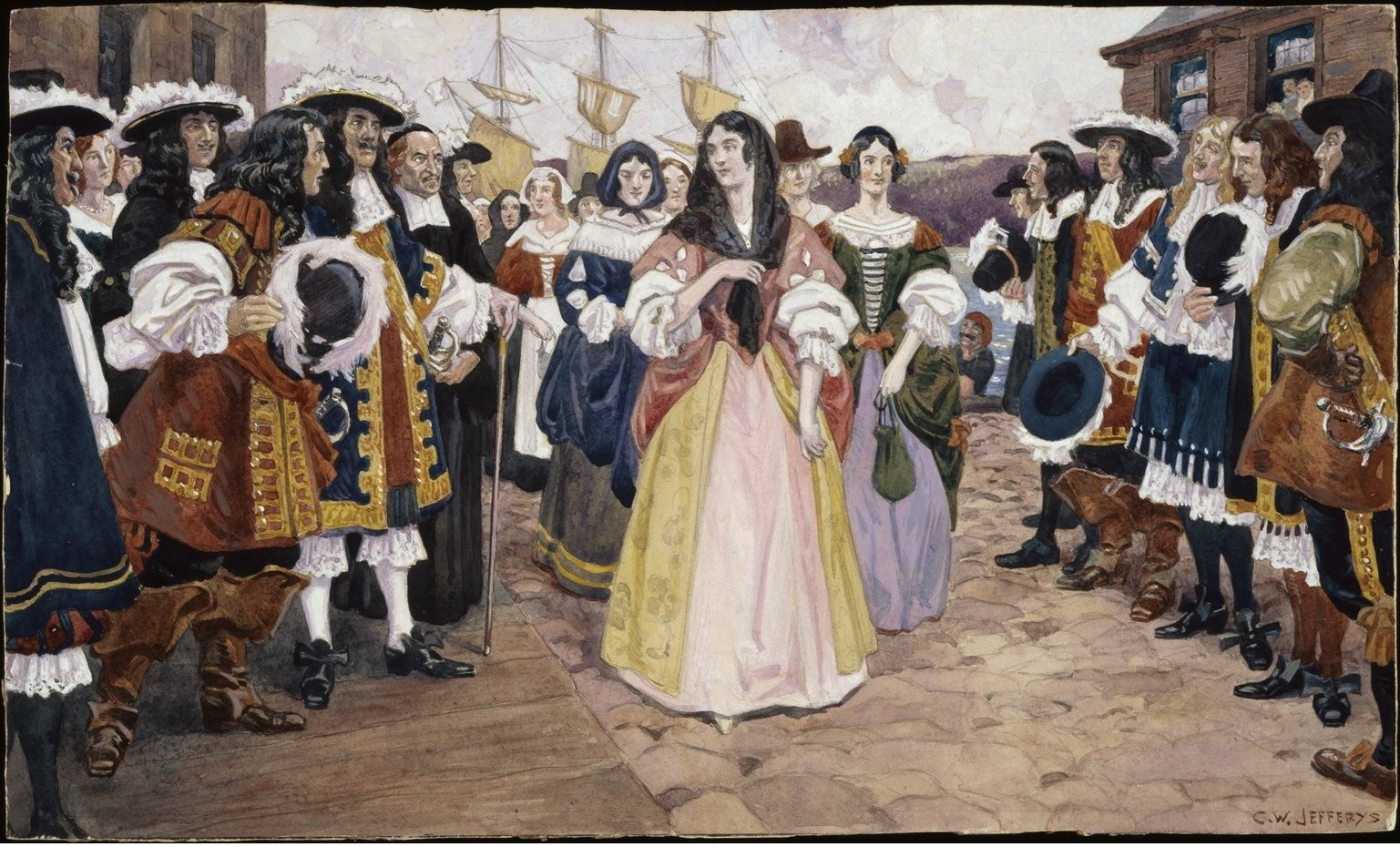
The Arrival of the French Girls at Quebec, 1667. Watercolour by Charles William Jefferys

The idea that the filles du roi were sex workers has been a rumor ever since the inception of the program in the 17th century. It seems to have arisen from a couple of misconceptions, both contemporary and modern, about immigration to French colonies in the New World. The first of these, which took root long before the first fille du roi emigrated, was that Canada was a penal colony. While there were two campaigns in the mid-17th century that involved the immigration of French criminals to Canada in exchange for their records being expunged, they were both short-lived. These programs resulted in little more than setting a precedent for viewing Canada as a place where those "of questionable morality" could be sent for some reason or the other.

The popularization of the idea that the filles du roi in particular were sex workers can be traced to an account by the Baron de Lahontan of his time in New France; several earlier sources made the same assertion, including Saint-Amant, Tallement des Réaux, and Paul LeJeune. In his account, Lahontan refers to the filles du roi as being "of middling virtue", and wrote that they had emigrated in the hopes of religious absolution. As early as 1738, Claude Le Beau countered his portrayal in an account of his own journey to New France, as did Pierre François Xavier de Charlevoix in his 1744 work.

Out of nearly 800 filles du roi, only one, Catherine Guichelin, was charged with prostitution while living in Canada, after she was abandoned by her husband. She appeared before the Sovereign Council of New France under the charge of carrying out "a scandalous life and prostitution" on 19 August 1675. Her two children were "adopted" by friends, and she was banished from Quebec City. She was reported to have turned to sex work after her husband, Nicholas Buteau, abandoned the family and returned to France. She later gave birth to many children out of wedlock. Guichelin had at least two marriage contracts cancelled. She also wed twice more after returning to Sorel, Quebec, then Montreal.

The ships carrying the filles du roi would travel up the Saint Lawrence River, stopping first at Quebec City, then at Trois-Rivières, and lastly at Montreal.

== Notable descendants ==
- Saint André Bessette, "Brother Andre", descendant of fille du roi Anne Le Seigneur (1649–1733). Anne Le Seigneur has been mis-identified as Anne Seigneur by Peter Gagne in his book "King's Daughters and Founding Mothers: The Filles du Roi, 1663-1673."
- Hillary Clinton, descendant of filles du roi Madeleine Niel and Jeanne Ducorps dite Leduc.
- Angelina Jolie, descendant of fille du roi Denise Colin.
- Madonna (Madonna Louise Ciccone), descendant of fille du roi Anne Seigneur (1649–1733). Her mother's ancestors are all French-Canadian from the 17th century. This is the same Anne Le Seigneur who was the grandmother of Saint André Bessette.
- Hall of Fame ice hockey player Bernie "Boom Boom" Geoffrion was a direct descendant of Marie Priault, a King's Daughter. She married Pierre Joffrion, a farmer and former grenadier from the Carignan-Salières Regiment, shortly after her arrival in 1669.
- Louis Coutlée, one of the descendants of Catherine Guichelin, became a founding father of Ottawa, Ontario, later Canada's capital. He descended from Marie Vacher, one of Catherine's illegitimate children. He was the first sheriff of Ottawa (after serving in the lower Canadian Militia during the Anglo-American War of 1812 with his father.)
- Coutlée's son, Dominique-Amable Coutlée, served as a member of Parliament in Canada.
- Tom Bergeron, descendant of Marguerite Ardion, as revealed in the August 30, 2015, episode of Who Do You Think You Are?
- Chloë Sevigny, descendant of fille du roi Marguerite Lamain, as revealed on the PBS series Finding Your Roots
- Andrée Champagne, descendant of fille du roi Marguerite Samson and husband Jean Beaugrand dit Champagne.
- Rodolphe Girard, descendant of fille du roi Isabelle Aupe and husband Pierre Lavoie.

== See also ==
- Casquette girl
- Órfãs do Rei
- First white child
