= Marguerite Bourgeoys =

French religious sister and saint

Saint Marguerite Bourgeoys CND
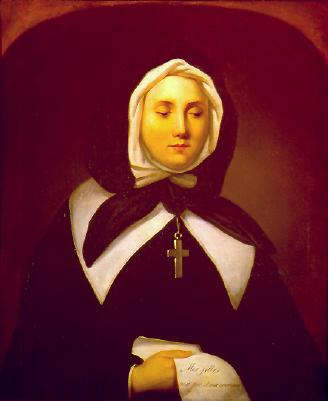
- Portrait of Blessed Marguerite Bourgeoys CND by Antoine Plamondon

Virgin
- Born: 17 April 1620; Troyes, Champagne, Kingdom of France
- Died: 12 January 1700 (aged 79); Fort Ville-Marie, New France, French Colonial Empire
- Venerated in: Catholic Church (Canada and the United States); Anglican Church of Canada
- Beatified: 12 November 1950 by Pope Pius XII
- Canonized: 31 October 1982, Vatican City by Pope John Paul II
- Major shrine: Notre-Dame-de-Bon-Secours Chapel in Montreal, Quebec, Canada
- Feast: 12 January
- Patronage: against poverty; loss of parents; people rejected by religious orders

Marguerite Bourgeoys, CND (French pronunciation: [maʁɡəʁit buʁʒwa]; 17 April 1620 – 12 January 1700), was a French religious sister and founder of the Congregation of Notre Dame of Montreal in the colony of New France, now part of Québec, Canada.

Born in Troyes, she became part of a sodality, ministering to the poor from outside the convent. She was recruited by the governor of Montreal to set up a convent in New France, and she sailed to Fort Ville-Marie (now Montreal) by 1653. There she developed the convent. She and her congregation educated young girls, the poor, and children of First Nations until shortly before her death in early 1700.

She is significant for developing one of the first uncloistered religious communities in the Catholic Church. Declared "venerable" by the pope in 1878, she was canonized in 1982 as the first female saint of Canada.

== Early life ==
Marguerite Bourgeoys was born on 17 April 1620 in Troyes, then in the ancient province of Champagne in the Kingdom of France. The daughter of Abraham Bourgeoys and Guillemette Garnier, she was the sixth of their twelve children.

As a girl, Bourgeoys was never much interested in joining the confraternity of the Congregation Notre-Dame attached to the monastery in town. It had been founded in 1597 by Alix Le Clerc, dedicated to the education of the poor. The canonesses of the monastery helped the poor, but remained cloistered. They were not allowed to teach outside the cloister. To reach poor young girls who could not afford to board within the cloister as students, they relied upon a sodality, whose members they would educate in both religion and pedagogy. Marguerite decided at about age 15 to join the sodality affiliated with the congregation.

In 1652, Paul de Chomedey, Sieur de Maisonneuve, the Governor of the French settlement at Montreal in New France, visited his sister, an Augustinian canoness in Troyes. She directed the sodality to which Bourgeoys belonged. The governor invited Marguerite Bourgeoys to come to Canada and start a school in Ville-Marie (eventually the city of Montreal).

Before February 1653, Bourgeoys accepted the assignment to set up a congregation and a mission in New France. She set sail on the Saint-Nicholas from France, along with approximately 100 other colonists, mostly men. They had been recruited and signed to working contracts.

== Life in the colony ==
Upon her arrival in the port of Quebec City on the following 22 September, Bourgeoys was offered hospitality with the Ursulines there while transportation to Ville-Marie was arranged. She declined the offer and spent her stay in Quebec living alongside poor settlers. The colony was so small that Bourgeoys would have soon come to know practically everyone.

During these early years, Bourgeoys initiated institution building. In 1657 she organized the formation of a work party to build Ville-Marie's first permanent church – the Notre-Dame-de-Bonsecours Chapel (French: Bonsecours), known in English as the Chapel of Our Lady of Good Counsel. In April 1658 she was provided with a vacant stone stable by de Maisonneuve, founder of Ville Marie, to serve as a schoolhouse for her students. This was the beginning of public schooling in Montreal, which Bourgeoys established five years after arrival.

Soon after receiving the stable, Bourgeoys departed for France to recruit more women to serve as teachers for the colony. She combined this goal with housing and caring for the King's Daughters or filles du roi, as they are known in Quebec, after they arrived from France. These were young women who were impoverished or orphaned or looking to start a new life whose passage to Nouvelle France was paid by the Crown in order to marry and create families in the colony. The young women had to be recommended by the Church as being of good character. Bourgeoys and her four companions also interviewed the male settlers who came to the settlement seeking a wife.

== Later life ==
The small group of women began to follow a religious way of life, establishing periods of common prayer and meals. The women also worked independently in various villages and towns throughout the colony, teaching the local children. During this three-year period, Bourgeoys and her small community sought official recognition and legitimacy from both the Crown and the religious establishment in New France. In 1669, Bourgeoys had an audience with François de Laval, the Apostolic Vicar of New France and its highest religious authority. He ultimately issued an ordinance that gave permission to the Congregation Notre-Dame to teach on the entire island of Montreal, as well as anywhere else in the colony that considered their services as necessary.

In 1670 Bourgeoys returned to France again, seeking an audience with the King to protect her community from being cloistered. She left with no money or clothing, only with a letter of recommendation by Jean Talon, Royal Intendant of the colony; he praised her great contribution to its future. By May 1671, she had met with Louis XIV, and had obtained letters patent from him that secured the viability of her community in New France as "secular Sisters". The French monarch wrote: "Not only has (Marguerite Bourgeoys) performed the office of schoolmistress by giving free instruction to the young girls in all occupations (...), far from being a liability to the country, she had built permanent buildings (...)."

== "Golden Age" ==
Helene Bernier refers to Bourgeoys's work after 1672 as the "Golden Age" of the Congregation.

She established a boarding school at Ville-Marie, so that girls of more affluent area families would not have to travel to Quebec for their education. She also established a school devoted to needle-work and other practical, artisan occupations for women in Pointe-Saint-Charles. Other members of the Congregation founded smaller schools in places such as Lachine, Pointe-aux-Trembles, Batiscan, and Champlain. In 1678, Bourgeoys reached out to Catholic Native communities, setting up a small school in Kahnawake, the mission village south of Montreal. Its population was primarily converted Mohawk and other Iroquois peoples.

During the 1680s, the congregation of sisters grew significantly and finally gained a strong foothold in the city of Québec. The new bishop in the colony, Jean-Baptiste De La Croix de Saint-Vallier, was impressed with the vocational school that Bourgeoys had established in Ville-Marie and worked with her to found a similar institution in Québec. Numerous sisters were brought to Île d'Orléans to help the growing community in that area. In 1692, the congregation opened a school in Québec that catered to girls from poor families.

== Final years ==
After announcing that she would step down in 1683, Bourgeoys stayed on as the figurehead of the Congregation until 1693. She gave up daily leadership, but worked to help her sisters retain their characteristic spirit. Bourgeoys and her colleagues kept their secular character despite efforts by Bishop Saint-Vallier to impose a cloistered life by a merger with the Ursulines. On 1 July 1698, the congregation was "canonically constituted a community".

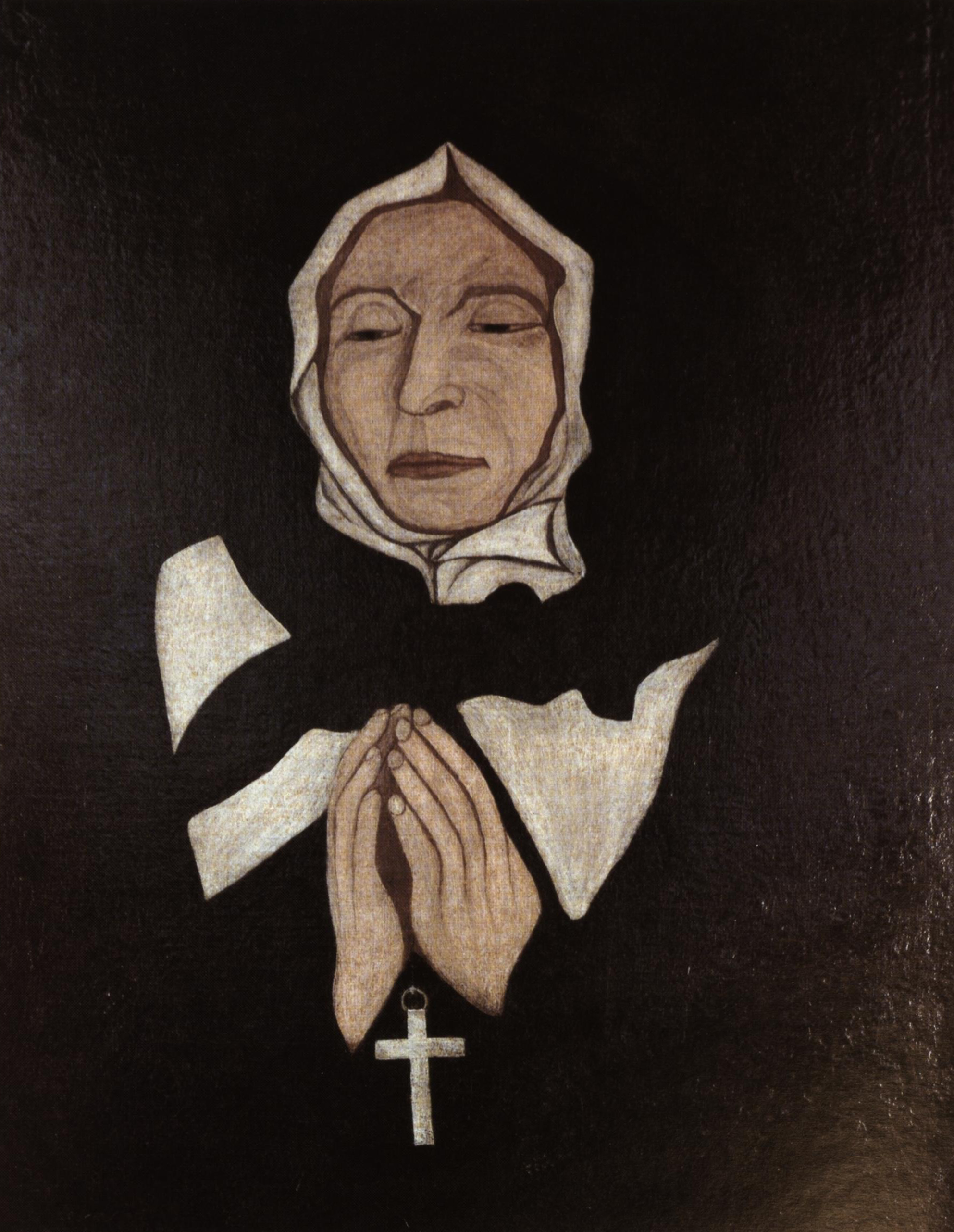
Portrait of Bourgeoys by Pierre Le Ber (1700)

During her last two years, Bourgeoys devoted her time primarily to prayer and writing her autobiography, of which some remnants have survived. She died in Montreal on 12 January 1700.

== Veneration and canonization in 1982 ==
The day following her death, a priest wrote, "If saints were canonized as in the past by the voice of the people and of the clergy, tomorrow we would be saying the Mass of Saint Marguerite of Canada." Helene Bernier writes, "[P]opular admiration had already canonized her 250 years before her beatification."

Numerous stories related to the time preceding her death. The elderly Sister Bourgeoys was said to have offered her life to God in order to save that of a younger member of the Congregation who had fallen ill. After intense prayer, the young sister was said to be cured, and Marguerite fell terribly ill, dying soon thereafter. After her death, she continued to be admired and highly regarded. The convent held an afternoon visitation open to the public; people treasured objects that they touched to her hands at this time, which became spiritual relics. Her body was kept by the parish of Ville-Marie, but her heart was removed and preserved as a relic by the Congregation.

Marguerite Bourgeoys was canonized by the Catholic Church in 1982, and is the first female saint of Canada. The process was begun nearly 100 years before in 1878, when Pope Leo XIII declared her "venerable". In November 1950, Pope Pius XII beatified her. The two miracles that led to her beatification both involved a miraculous cure from gangrene of the foot, gained by Joseph Descoteaux of St. Celestin, Quebec; and John Ludger Lacroix of St. Johnsbury, Vermont. On 2 April 1982, Pope John Paul II issued the Decree of Miracle for a cure attributed to her intercession. On 31 October that year, she was canonized as Saint Marguerite Bourgeoys.

== Honours ==
On 30 May 1975 Canada Post issued the stamp, "Marguerite Bourgeoys, 1620–1700", designed by Jacques Roy and based on a painting by Elmina Lachance. The 8¢ stamps are perforated 12.5 x 12 and were printed by Ashton-Potter Limited.

== Sources ==
- Simpson, Patricia (1997). Marguerite Bourgeoys and Montreal, 1640–1665. McGill-Queen's University Press. ISBN 978-0-7735-6657-6.
