= Pioneers' Obelisk (Montreal) =

- Pioneers' Obelisk in 2026
- Interactive map of Pioneers' Obelisk
- Location: Place d'Youville (Montreal)
- Coordinates: 45°30′03″N 73°33′20″W
- Designer: J.A.U. Baudry
- Type: Obelisk
- Material: Stanstead grey granite
- Height: 41 feet (12 m)
- Beginning date: 1893
- Opening date: May 17, 1894
- Dedicated to: Montreal Founders

The Pioneers' Monument Obelisk is a monument in Old Montreal.

== Overview ==
The granite obelisk commemorates the founding of Fort Ville-Marie, later to become Montreal close to this spot on May 17, 1642. The monument was erected by the Société historique de Montréal (Historical Society of Montreal) to celebrate the city's 250th birthday.

The obelisk is made from a block of granite that stands 41 feet (12.5 m) tall and is 3 feet (0.91 m) square at its base. It took 40 horses to drag the shaft into the city in 1893. The monument was unveiled on May 17, 1894.

It has been moved a number of times before it was placed in its present location in 1999. It made its debut somewhat west of its present location. In the 1940s it moved again, to the Old Customs House. The monument's present location is believed to be where Montreal's first mass was held.

== Plaques ==
Each of the four faces of the obelisk bears a plaque.

The first plaque describes the founding of Montreal by Paul Chomedey de Maisonneuve on May 18, 1642.

A second plaque describes the creation of the monument by the Société historique de Montréal and provides a quote from the first mass by Barthélemy Vimont.

A third plaque, located on the south-face, provides a list of the Founders of Montreal, including organizers and benefactors of the mission, most of whom remained in France. Prominence is given to Jérôme le Royer de la Dauversière and Jean-Jacques Olier, founder of the Society of Saint-Sulpice.

The final plaque, located on the north side of the obelisk, lists the names of the colonists who came between May and December 1642. The North plaque translates from French to:

Names of the first colonists of Montreal
1642
May–August

- Paul Chomedey de Maisonneuve
- R.P. Poncet S.J.
- Pierre Puiseaux de Montrenault
- Jeanne Mance
- Catherine Barre,
- Jean Corry and Isabeau Panie (wife of Jean Corry)
- Jean Robelin
- Augustin Hebert and Adrienne Du Vivier (wife of Augustin Hebert)
- Antoine Damien and Marie Joly (wife of Antoine Damien)
- Jean Caillot
- Pierre Laimery
- Nicolas Godé and Francoise Gadois (wife of Nicolas Godé)
- Francoise Godé (daughter of Nicolas Godé)
- Nicolas Godé (son of Nicolas Godé)
- Mathurine Godé (daughter of Nicolas Godé)
- Marie-Madeleine de Chauvigny de la Peltrie
- And several others whose names are unknown (French: Et plusieurs autres dont les noms sont inconnus)

August–December

- J.B.Le Gardeur de Repentigny
- R.P.Joseph Ihbert Duperon S.J.
- Louis d.Ailledoust de Coulonge and Barbe de Boullonge
- Philippine de Boullonge
- Gilbert Barbier
- David de la Touze
- Guillaume Boissier
- Bernard Berte
- Pierre Laforest
- Cesar Leger
- Jean Caron
- Leonard Lucot-Barbeau
- Jacques Haudebert
- Jean Masse
- Mathurin Serrurier
- Jean-Baptiste Damiee
- Jacques Boni
- Jean Philippes
- Pierre Didier
- Pierre Quesnel
- Julien Pothier
- N. Bellanger
- Louis Gode
- Jean Mattemale
- Pierre Bigot
- Guillaume Lebeau
- Catherine Lezeau

General notes about pioneers listed: Father Barthélemy Vimont is not listed among the first colonists, but there is abundant evidence that he gave the first mass at Ville-Marie on May 18, 1642. Also, the name of Adrienne Du Vivier is listed with her husband. However, Du Vivier was still in France at the time of the first settlement, marrying Hebert in 1646. The couple, along with their eldest daughter, Jeanne, then sailed from France to New France with Maisonneuve in 1648. Hebert and Du Vivier's second daughter, Pauline, was the first white baby baptized in Ville-Marie. Some research also lists Nicolas Godé's eldest son, Francois (age 21 at the time), as part of this first mission but most research suggest that he remained in Quebec before travelling to Ville-Marie in the fall of 1642. The Godés have been called the "First Family of Montreal", as their children that accompanied them were all in their teens or younger at the time of the first settlement. No other children accompanied this first group.

== See also ==
- Société Notre-Dame de Montréal

== Gallery ==
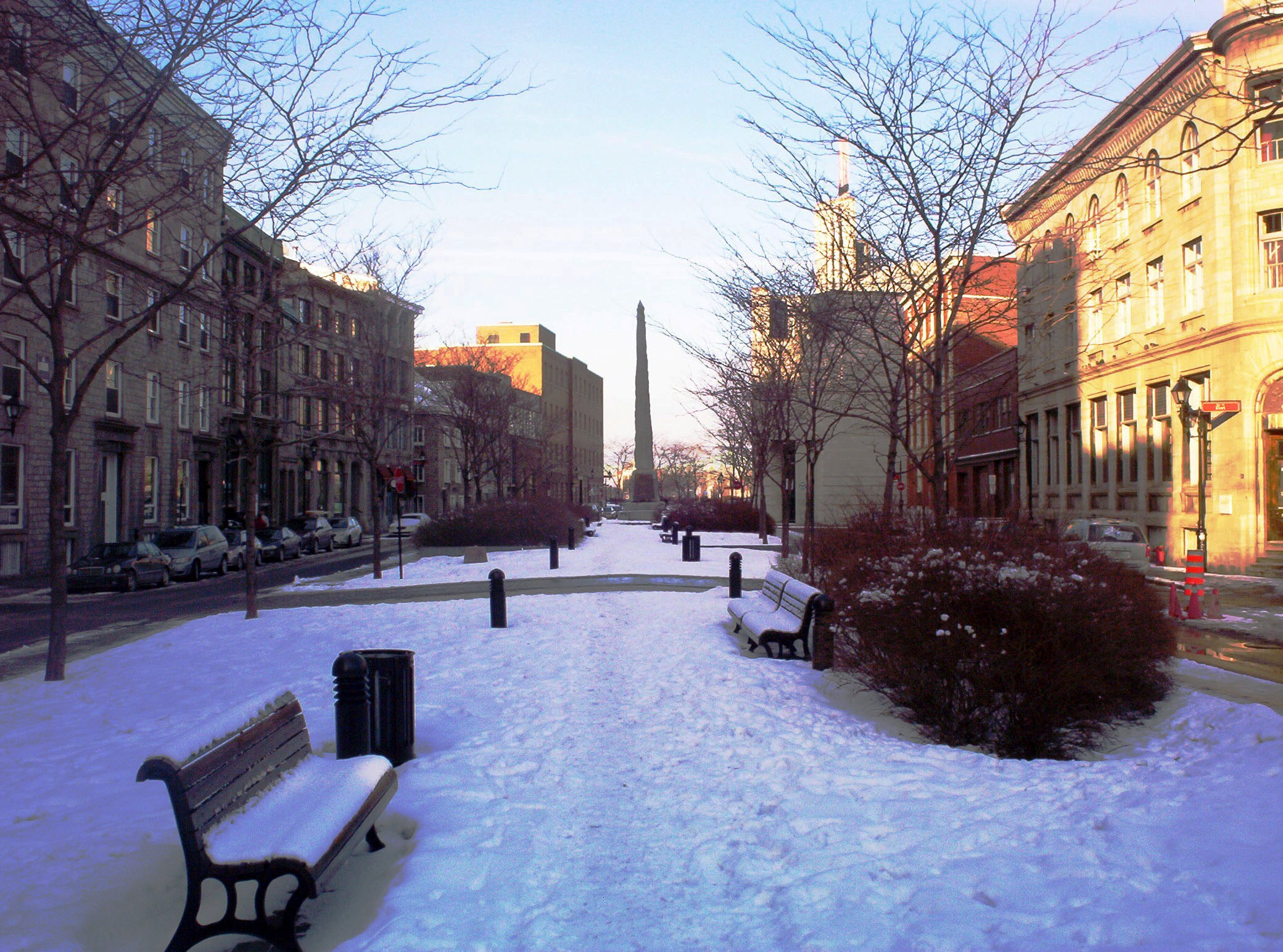
Place d'Youville (Montreal)

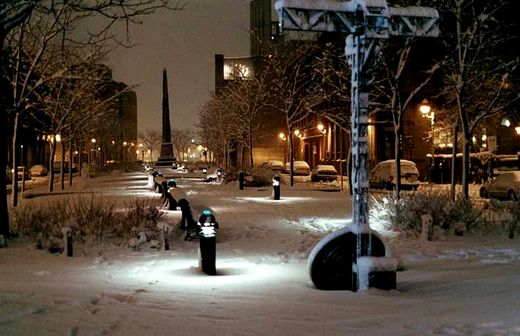
Place d'Youville, looking east

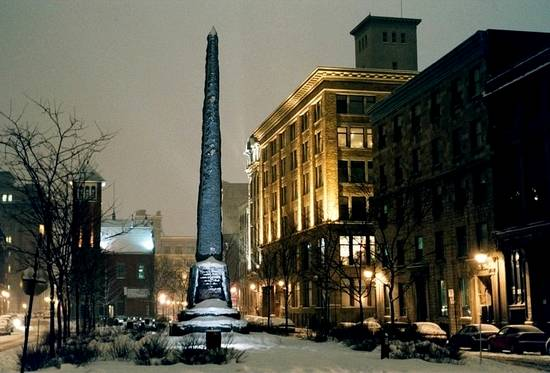
Place d'Youville looking West

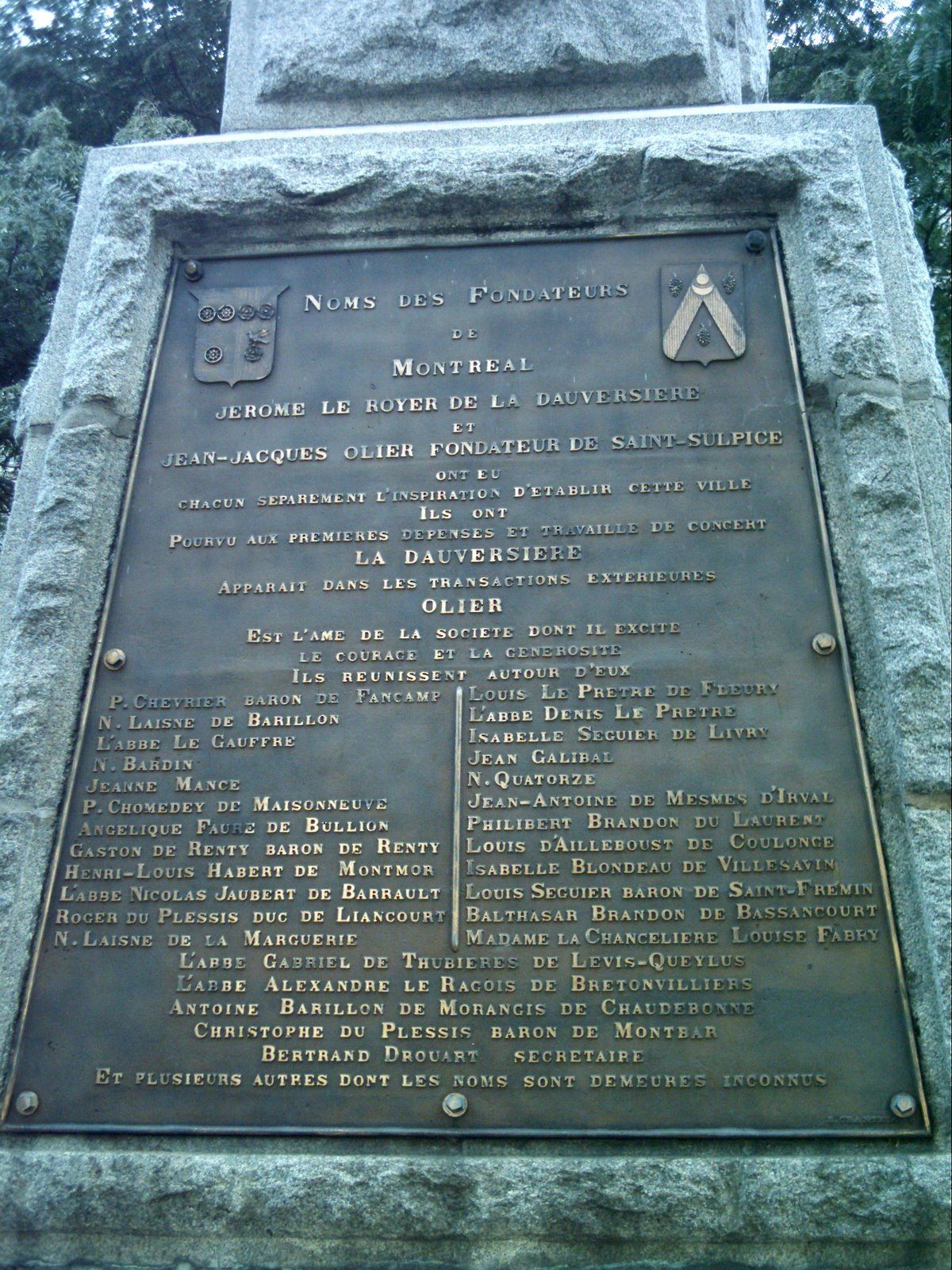
Founders of Montreal (South plaque)

== Notes ==
- FICHE D'UNE OEUVRE D'ART Vieux-Montréal

== Photographs ==
- Pioneers Monument Obelisk about 1890 - McCord Museum
