= 1650s in Canada =

Events from the 1650s in Canada.

== Events ==
- 1649-64: the Beaver Wars: Encouraged by the English, and the need for more beaver for trade (their own area being hunted out), Haudenosee (Iroquois) make war on Hurons (1649), Tobaccos (1649), Neutrals (1650–51), Erie (1653–56), Ottawa (1660), Illinois and Miami (1680–84), and members of the Mahican confederation. English, pleased with this, agree to Two-Row Wampum Peace treaty, 1680.
- 1650-53: Huron survivors of the Beaver Wars settle at Lorette under French protection.
- 1652: Massachusetts General Court licenses traders going from Massachusetts to Acadia.
- 1653 Marguerite Bourgeoys (Born Troyes, France 17 April 1620 Died 12 January 1700) the first school teacher in Montreal, arrives from France.
- 1654: Port Royal seized by Robert Sedgwick. He would hold on to Acadia until 1670.
- 1653 Louis Chartier, a surgeon, arrives in Ville-Marie to provide medical aid to the settlement.
- 1654-59: Pierre-Esprit Radisson, French Sieur de Groselliers, encounters many tribes throughout New France, New England, and what is now the U.S. Midwest. Adopted by a Mohawk family, who take him to Hudson Bay, there he changes sides and becomes English, participates in the formation of Hudson's Bay Company, and charter of Rupert's Land to it in 1670, deftly switching country allegiances several times France-England-France-England during the process. Ends up English. Today principally remembered by a hotel named after him in Minneapolis.
- 1655 Étienne Bouchard, a surgeon, begins a successful private medical practice in Ville-Marie.
- c. 1655: One of the coureurs de bois, adventurous, unlicensed fur traders who want to escape company restrictions, explores west of Lake Superior.
- 1657: Sulpicians, who run missions, come to North America.
- 1658 Marguerite Bourgeoys established the Congregation of Notre Dame, the first uncloistered order of nuns in North America.
- 1659: A vicar apostolic, the Jesuit-trained Bishop Francois X. de Laval-Montmorency (1623–1708) arrives in Quebec in June as vicar general of the pope to take command of the missions and to found parishes.

== See also ==
- Former colonies and territories in Canada
- Timeline of the European colonization of North America
- History of Canada
- Timeline of Canada history
- List of years in Canada
