= Adrienne Du Vivier =

French pioneer in Montreal, Quebec

- Born: 1626; Corbeny, Picardy, France
- Died: October 20, 1706; Montreal, Quebec, Canada
- Resting place: Notre-Dame Church (Montreal)
- Known for: Early settler of Montreal
- Spouses: Augustin Hébert (m. 1646–1653) Robert Lecavelier (m. 1654–1699)
- Children: 8
- Parent(s): Antoine Du Vivier; Catherine Journe

Adrienne Du Vivier (1626 – 20 October 1706) was a French pioneer and one of the first white women to settle in the colony of Montreal, Quebec, Canada. She and her husband are often referred to as "Montreal's First Citizens."

== Arrival in Montreal ==
Adrienne was born in 1626 in Corbeny, Picardy, France, a daughter of Antoine Du Vivier and Catherine Journe.

In 1646, in St. Bartholemi, Paris, at the age of twenty, she married a soldier Augustin Hébert (1623 – 23 November 1653) who had just returned from Canada. He was a son of Jean Hebert and Isabeau Troussart of Caen, Normandy. In 1647, their first child Jeanne was born and baptised in St. Bartholemi, Paris.

At the end of the year, Adrienne, her husband and baby Jeanne sailed from La Rochelle to New France along with the founder of Montreal Paul Chomedey de Maisonneuve. They arrived at Montreal Island, in early 1648, and they settled in Montreal, which was then called Fort Ville-Marie. Adrienne was one of the few white women in the colony apart from Jeanne Mance who had founded a hospital with a group of nuns.

Early in 1649, she had another daughter, Pauline, who was the first white child baptised in Montreal. Maisonneuve stood as godfather, Jeanne Mance was godmother. The child died a few weeks later.

Augustin and Adrienne were deeded a huge parcel of land on the island. Augustin was a fur-trader, merchant, farmer and master-mason. He often traded with the Iroquois Indians. He and Adrienne had four children, of whom three reached adulthood. Adrienne and her husband were the first colonists to enroll an indentured servant otherwise known as an engagé.

== Second marriage ==
In 1653, her husband Augustin died. His goods and property were transferred to her and she became one of Montreal's largest landowners. Adrienne married secondly 19 November 1654, Robert Lecavelier, a gunsmith from Cherbourg-en-Cotentin, Normandy (died 28 July 1699). By Lecavelier, she had four children. They are listed on the 1666 Montreal Census.

Adrienne died on 20 October 1706 at the age of eighty. She was buried in Notre Dame de Montreal. She has numerous descendants in Canada, the United States, and Europe. These include Felix Hebert, Sir Wilfrid Laurier, Robert Bourassa, Jules Léger, Daniel Johnson Sr., Daniel Johnson Jr., Pierre-Marc Johnson, Paul Martin Sr., Paul Martin Jr., Jacques Parizeau, Joseph-Armand Bombardier, Alanis Morissette, and Mario Lemieux. Her name is engraved on the Pioneers Obelisk along with other Montreal pioneers in the city's Place d'Youville, commissioned by the Historical Society of Montreal.

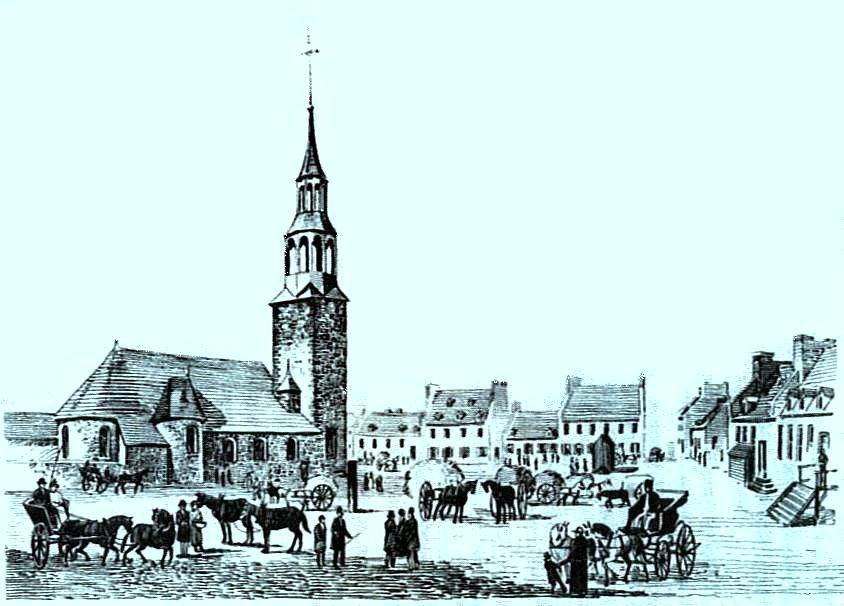
Adrienne Du Vivier was buried in the Notre-Dame Church

== List of children ==
- Jeanne Hébert (1647 Paris, France – 25 March 1687 Montreal, Canada). Married 7 March 1660 in Montreal, Jacques Milot (1632, Crouzille, Le Mans, Maine, France – 15 August 1699, Montreal), by whom she had eleven children, including Catherine Milot, whose youngest son, Joseph, by her second marriage to voyageur Jean Joffrion, settled in Louisiana, and married Jeanne Marie Rabalais, by whom he had issue. Their direct line continues to the present day.
- Pauline Hébert (16 January 1649 Montreal – 28 January 1649)
- Leger Hébert (19 April 1650 Montreal – 28 April 1719) St. Francois-du-Lac, Canada). Married Marguerite Gamelin (b. 1664), by whom he had 13 children, at least seven of whom survived childhood. Leger's direct line continues to the present day.
- Ignace Hébert (28 October 1652 Montreal – 25 July 1722 Varennes, Canada). Married firstly Jeanne Messier, by whom he had four sons. Their direct line continues to the present day. Married secondly Thèrése Choquette, by whom he had another four children.
- Marie Madeleine Lecavelier (1657 Montreal – 13 December 1716). Married Antoine Forestier (1646-1717)
- Jean Baptiste Lecavelier (b. 1659 Montreal). Married Anne La Marque (7 July 1648- 1686), by whom he had issue.
- Louis Michel Lecavelier (b. 1664 Montreal).
- Pierre Lecavelier (b. 1662 Montreal). He is presumed to have died young.
