= Angélique Bullion =

French philanthropist (1593–1664)

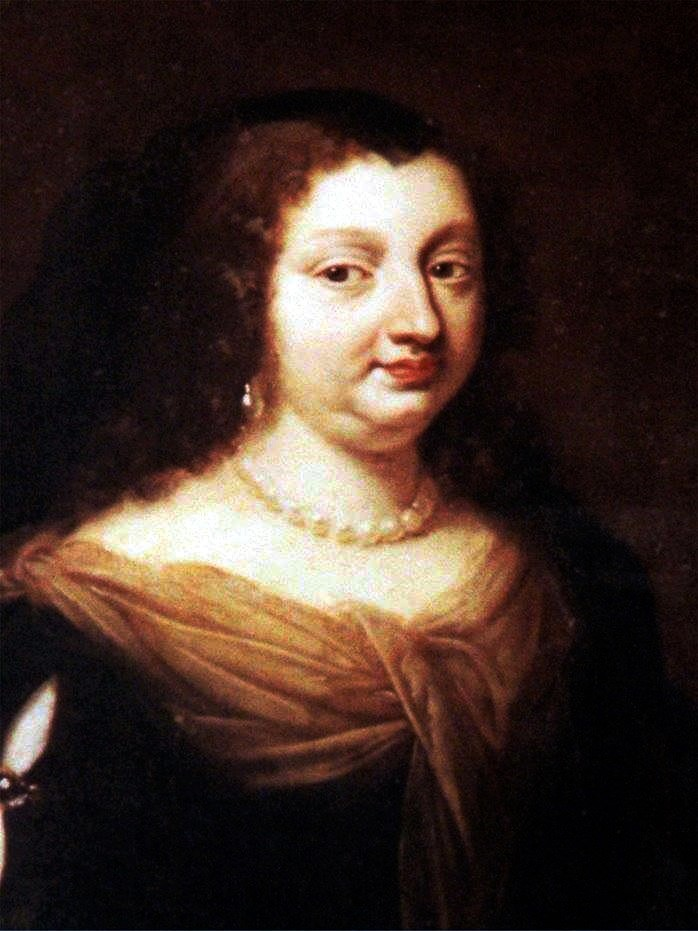
Angélique Faure de Bullion

Angélique de Bullion (1593–1664), was a French philanthropist. She was a benefactress influential in the foundation of Montreal.

== Life ==
Angélique Faure was born in Paris; her parents were Guichard Faure and Madeleine Brulart de Sillery. She was the niece of Noël Brûlart de Sillery, who, in 1632, donated twelve thousand livres to fund the foundation of St. Joseph Mission in New France (Canada), as a settlement for indigenous converts to Catholicism. The mission would eventually be named Sillery, in memory of his generosity.

On January 21, 1612, she married Claude de Bullion, Keeper of the Seals and Superintendent of Finances under Louis XIII; Cardinal Richelieu annually rewarded him with a bonus of 100,000 livres.

=== Société Notre-Dame de Montréal ===
The Society of Our Lady of Montréal for the conversion of the Indians of New France, (sometimes known as the "Company Our Lady of Montreal") was formed in 1641 by Jean-Jacques Olier de Verneuil and Jérôme Le Royer, Sieur de La Dauversière with the aim of establishing a fortified city in New France in order to teach French settlers and Christian Indians.

Upon the death of her husband in 1640, she inherited a large fortune, including the Château de Brie-Comte-Robert. In 1641, Father Charles Rapine de Boisvert, former Provincial of the Recollects, Director of Saint-Denis and a distant cousin of her husband, introduced her to Jeanne Mance, a nurse from Champagne and member of the Society of Our Lady of Montréal, who planned to accompany Paul Chomedey de Maisonneuve to New France. She and her friend Madame de Villesasin (Isabelle Blondeau) were benefactors of the Hôtel-Dieu de Paris. Having learned that the Duchess d'Aiguillon had funded the establishment of a hospital in Quebec, Madame de Bullion offered Jeanne Mance 1,200 livres for a similar undertaking at Ville-Marie.

An agreement between Angélique Faure de Bullion and Jeanne Mance is the oldest letter in the Archives Department of the City of Montréal.

The Hôtel-Dieu was founded in honour of Saint Joseph and confided in 1657–59 to the care of the Religious Hospitallers of St. Joseph, an order instituted at La Flèche by Jérôme le Royer de la Dauversière, one of the founders of Montréal. She also contributed more than 20,000 livres for the defence of the settlement against the Iroquois.

In 1663, shortly after the death of Olier and La Dauversière, the company was dissolved.

She insisted on being mentioned in the deeds ratifying her donations as "An unknown benefactress". Her identity was revealed only after her death, on July 3, 1664. She bequeathed her assets to the Compagnie de Saint-Sulpice, which was active in Montréal.

== Legacy ==
Formerly Rue Saint-Constant and then Cadieux Street, on May 9, 1927, de Bullion Street, Montreal was named in her honour.
