= Étienne Bouchard =

Étienne Bouchard (c. 1622 – 1676) was a French surgeon who came to Ville-Marie (Montreal) in 1653 under the sponsorship of the Société Notre-Dame de Montréal.

Bouchard traveled to New France with two other surgeons, one of whom was Louis Chartier. He was allowed to break his contract with the "Société" in 1655 and proceeded to establish an impressive practice. He married in Canada and he and his wife had seven children. He was an officer in the surgeons' guild with Jean Martinet de Fonblanche and was a doctor for the Hôtel-Dieu de Montréal.
