= Louis Chartier =

Louis Chartier (1633–1660 ) was a surgeon sent to Canada from France in 1653. He was part of an initiative which was to strengthen Montreal. The Société Notre-Dame de Montréal, who were responsible for founding Ville-Marie, had pledged to provide free medical care for the settlers. One of his companions in this endeavour was Étienne Bouchard, another surgeon.

Chartier died of drowning during a defence of the settlement against an Iroquois attack. It is believed that he also had spent part of one year as a captive of the Iroquois.

Chartier was important to the history of the area because of the role he played in the infancy of the Ville-Marie settlement.
