= Jérôme le Royer de la Dauversière =

French nobleman, founder of Montreal and a congregation of nursing sisters

Venerable Jérôme le Royer de la Dauversière
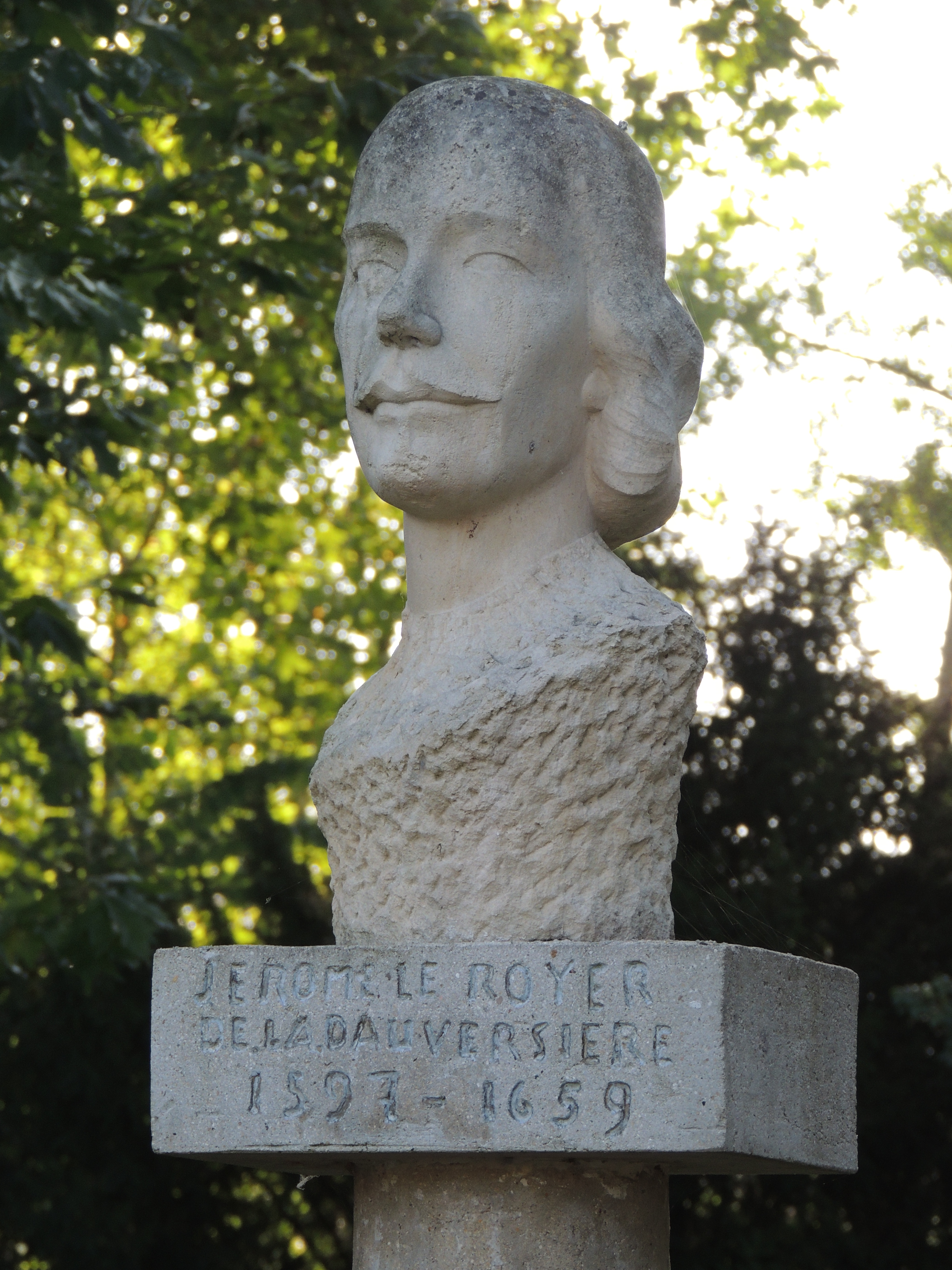
- A bust of de la Dauversière in La Flèche, France
- Born: 18 March 1597; La Flèche, Maine, Kingdom of France
- Died: 6 November 1659 (aged 62); La Flèche, Maine, Kingdom of France
- Major works: Founder of the Société Notre-Dame de Montréal and of the Religious Hospitallers of St. Joseph

Jérôme le Royer de la Dauversière (French pronunciation: [ʒeʁom lə ʁwaje də la dovɛʁsjɛʁ]; 18 March 1597 – 6 November 1659) was a French nobleman who spent his life in serving the needs of the poor. A founder of the Société Notre-Dame de Montréal, he also helped to establish the French colony of Montreal. He was the founder of the Congregation of the Religious Hospitallers of St. Joseph, Religious Sisters dedicated to the care of the sick poor and has been declared venerable by the Catholic Church.

== Biography ==
He was born in La Flèche in the ancient Province of Maine on 18 March 1597, the younger son of Jérôme le Royer, first seigneur of La Dauversière, a local tax collector, and of Renée (or Marie) Oudin. His family originated in Brittany.

Royer was one of the first pupils of the Jesuit Collège at La Flèche, founded in 1604 by King Henry IV of France. There he met Father Charles Lalemant, who had entered the Society of Jesus in 1607 and was ten years his senior, and also Father Paul Le Jeune, who had entered in 1613. In addition to the philosopher René Descartes, he had as fellow-students several of the great missionaries of New France, such as François Ragueneau, Claude Quentin, Charles Du Marché, and Jacques Buteux. With them, in 1614 he heard Father Énemond Massé speak of the Acadian missions, recently abandoned as a result of the English conquest.

Upon the death of his father in the summer of 1619, Royer inherited the estate "La Dauversière", whence comes the title attached to his name, and his father's government post. He followed in his father's footsteps as a tax collector. In 1620 he married Jeanne de Baugé, with whom he had six children. Two of his sons would become priests, and both of his daughters became nuns.

== Holy Family Brotherhood ==
On 2 February 1630, while at Mass, Dauversière felt that he had heard the calling to found a religious congregation of charitable young women in La Flèche dedicated to the Holy Family and under the special protection of St. Joseph for the service of the poor and the sick, especially in France's new colony in North America. Hesitating, he confided in his confessor, the Jesuit Father Chauveau, and various other priests who all dissuaded him from carrying out his plan.

Possessed of firm piety, even though he was unclear as to the validity of the calling he felt, Dauversière and his brother Joseph organized charitable undertakings in his small town. He began by undertaking the renovation of the old Hôtel-Dieu (Hostel of God), where the sick poor of the city received care. He came to know Marie de la Ferre, who shared with him her calling to care for the sick and suffering.

In February 1635, however, while at prayer at the Cathedral of Notre-Dame in Paris, Dauversière experienced another vision which convinced him to go ahead with his plan.

== The Religious Hospitallers of St. Joseph ==
In May 1636, Marie de la Ferre and Anne Foureau committed themselves to lives of religious service at the Hotel-Dieu with three servants of the poor already working there. Thus began the Congregation of the Daughters Hospitallers of St. Joseph. In 1643 the first constitutions of the new congregation were approved and on 22 January 1644, Ferre and eleven companions made simple vows for one year in the Congregation of the Daughters of St. Joseph. Then they proceeded to the election of Marie de la Ferre as superior of the newly born community. The congregation gradually established houses in other French towns.

== Montreal ==
With the Parisian priest Jean-Jacques Olier, founder of the Society of Saint-Sulpice, Dauversière formed the idea of establishing at the colony of Fort Ville-Marie in New France several communities: one of priests to convert the Indians, one of Religious Sisters to nurse the sick, and another to teach the local children of the Native Americans. Olier involved some of his wealthy penitents, while Royer found support from the Baron de Fanchamp, also a native of La Flèche. Others joined in, one being Angélique Bullion, and six persons formed The Company of Montreal (French: Société Notre-Dame de Montréal). They raised between them 75,000 livres.

The Company of Montreal was founded in Paris in 1639, notably by Dauversiere, with his friend the Baron de Fancamp and the Abbé Olier. These three were men who had become part of the movement for "montreal" and who, as a result of a near mystical vision shared nearly identically but independently by Royer and Olier, had bought the rights to the Island. Chausseau relinquished his seigneural rights in 1639 to the Intendant of the Association, Jean de Lauson, who, in turn, signed it over to Royer on 7 August 1640.

The society sponsored Paul Chomedey de Maisonneuve and Jeanne Mance, a lay woman, to go to Ville Marie with French colonists to evangelize the Native Americans, and establish a hospital, which became the Hôtel-Dieu de Montréal, to care for the poor, founded by Mance in 1642.

In 1657 Mance returned to France, where she recruited three Hospitallers from a community of Hospitallers in Laval founded in 1650, Judith Moreau de Brésoles, Catherine Mace and Marie Maillet, to work at the hospital she had established. They set sail from La Rochelle for Ville-Marie on 2 July 1659. Dauversière boarded the boat before its departure to bless his spiritual daughters. A fellow traveler on that boat was Marguerite Bourgeoys, who was to play a major role in the future of the colony, founding the Congregation of Notre Dame of Montreal. The Hospitaller Sisters received letters patent from King Louis XIV of France authorizing them to take over the hospital and its operations two years after their arrival.

Place de la Dauversière is a space for rest and relaxation that opened in Montreal in 1997.

== Death and veneration ==
Dauversière took ill when he arrived home from La Rochelle where he had traveled to see the fulfillment of his vision. He spent four months with increasing debilitation, until his death on 6 November of that same year. His writings were approved by theologians on 27 November 1937, and his cause for canonization was eventually begun. On 6 July 2007, he was declared Venerable by Pope Benedict XVI.

== Gallery ==
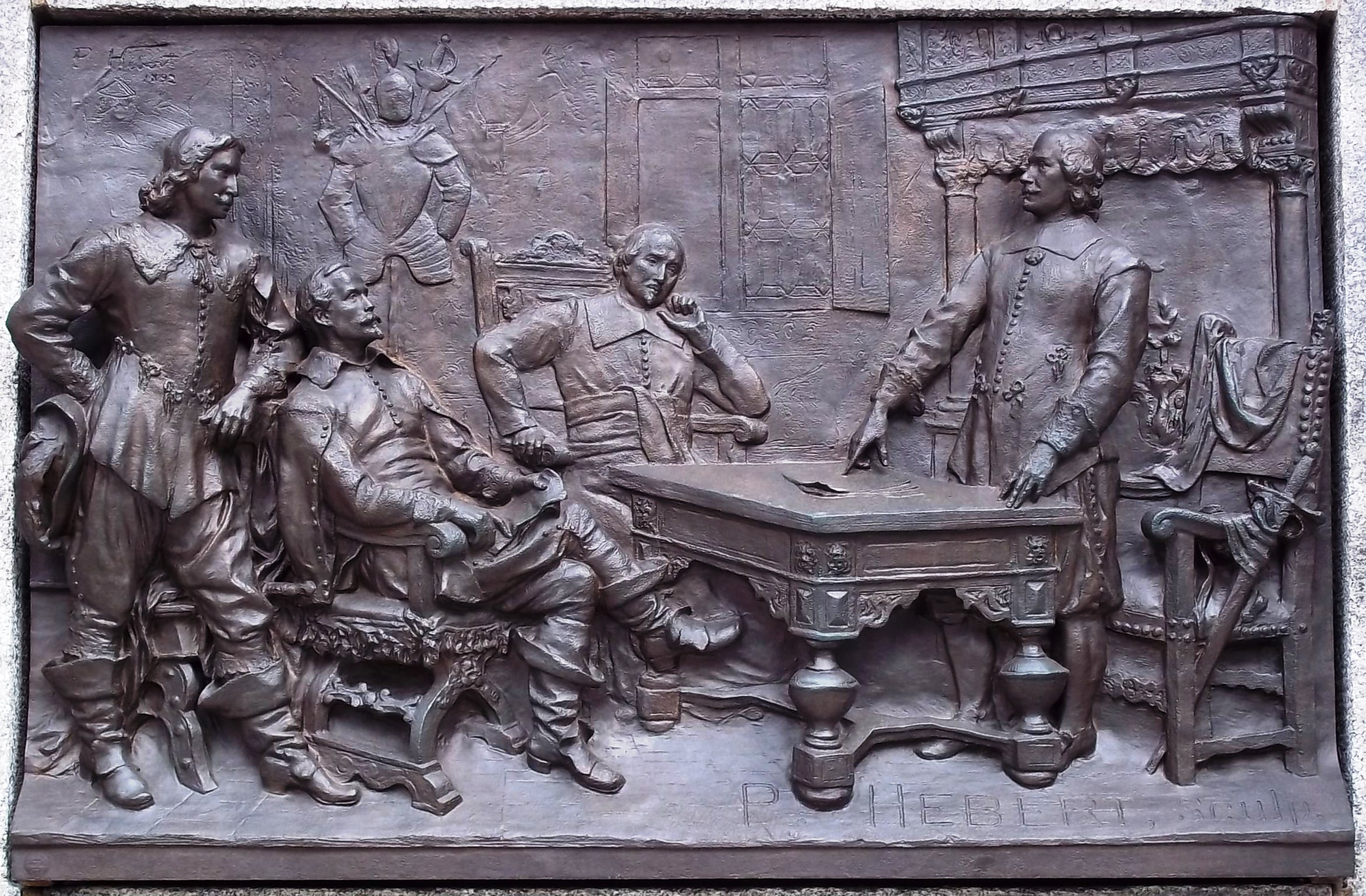
Gaston de Rentry, Pierre Chevrier, baron de Fancamp, Jean-Jacques Olier, and Jérôme le Royer de la Dauversière

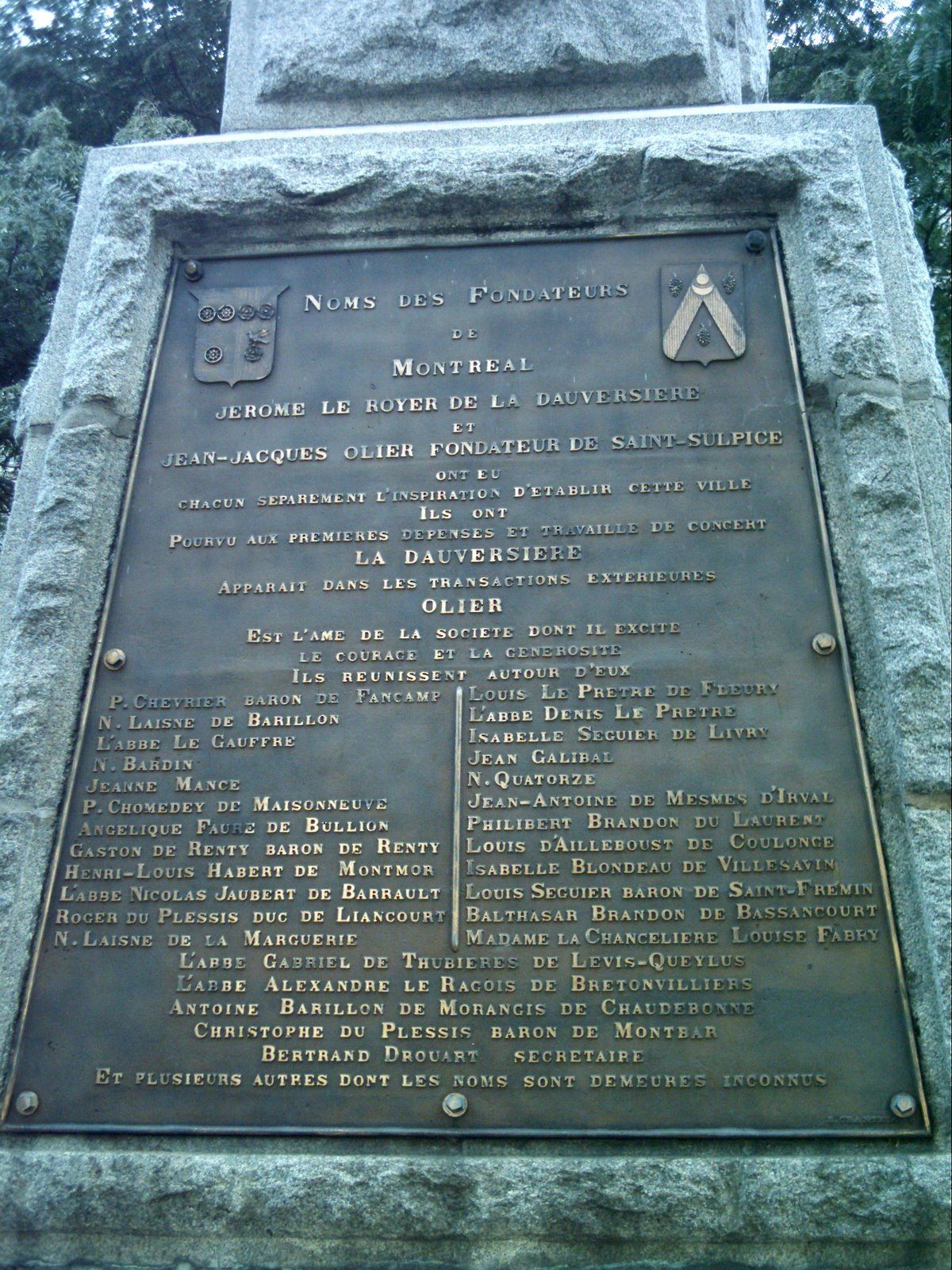
Montreal founders

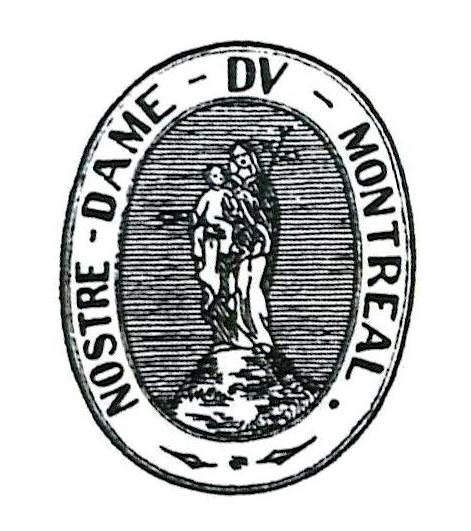
Coat of arms of the Société Notre-Dame de Montréal

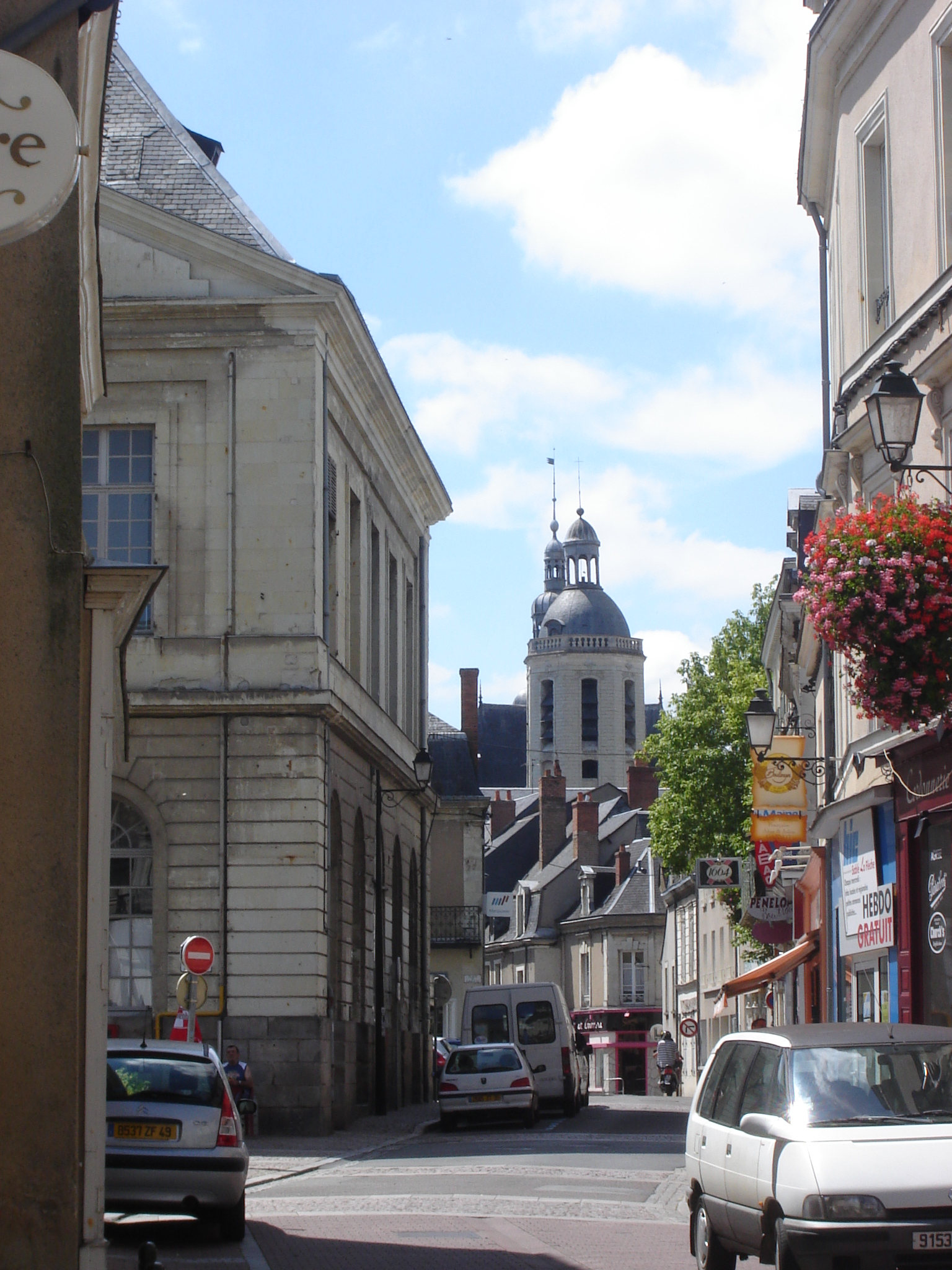
Rue de la Dauversière in La Flèche

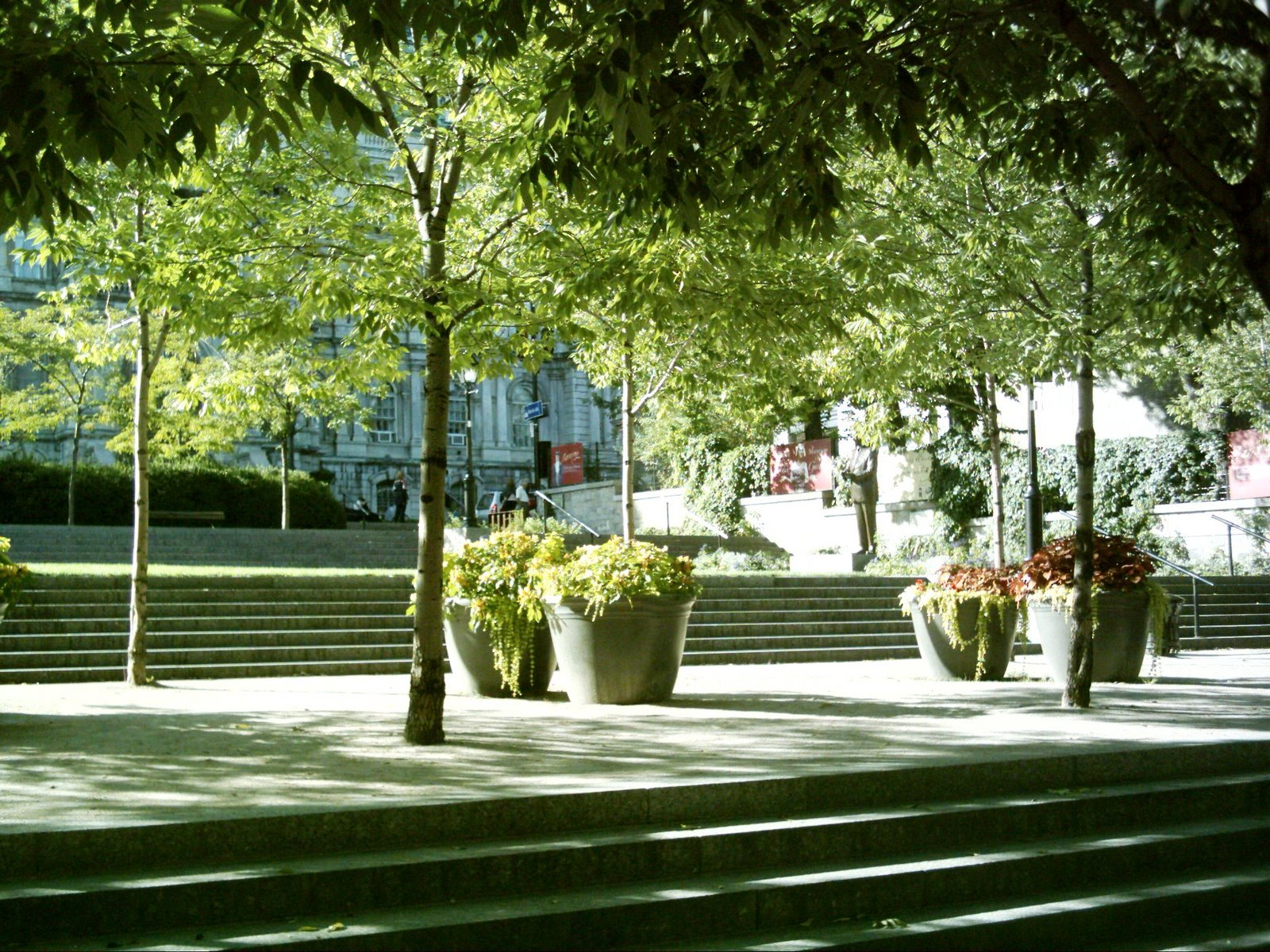
Place de la Dauversière, Montreal
