= Guillaume Bailly =

Guillaume Bailly (died 1696) was a Sulpician missionary to Canada from 1666 to 1691.

During that period, Bailly was associated with the Congrégation de Notre-Dame. He spent some time directing the Sulpician mission, founded in 1676, at Mount Royal. He also taught there and was a devoted teacher and skillful in native languages. He was recalled to the seminary because of problems with his involvement with the native population.

Noted to have had skills as an architect, he is credited with drawing up the plans for the Hôtel-Dieu de Montréal when it was rebuilt in stone in 1688.
