= Hôtel-Dieu de Montréal =

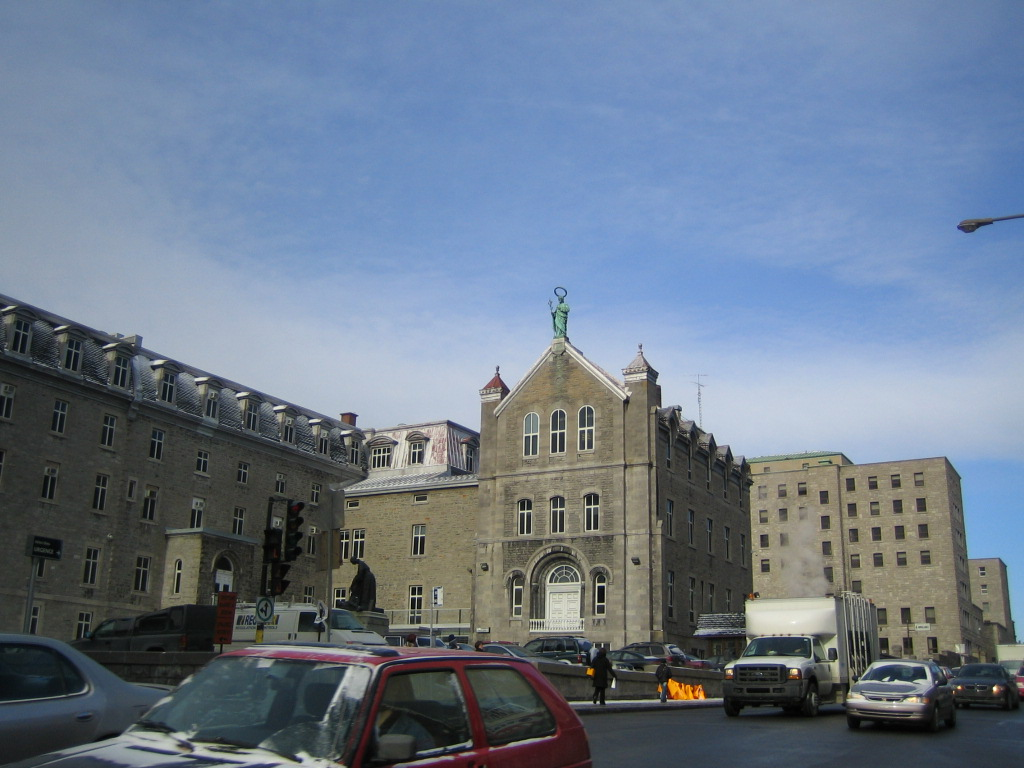

- Location in Montreal

Geography
- Location: 3840, rue Saint-Urbain; Montreal, Quebec; H2W 1T8
- Coordinates: 45.514587°N 73.578937°W

Organisation
- Affiliated university: Université de Montréal Faculty of Medicine

History
- Founded: October 8, 1645
- Closed: November 5, 2017 (as an active hospital)

The Hôtel-Dieu de Montréal (French pronunciation: [otɛl djø də mɔ̃ʁeal]; founded in 1645) was the first hospital established in Montreal, Quebec, Canada.

Hôtel-Dieu, literally translated in English as Hotel of God, is an archaic French term for hospital, referring to the origins of hospitals as religious institutions.

Its emergency room and function as an active hospital ended in 2017, and as of 2020 serves as a COVID-19 test site during the COVID-19 pandemic in Montreal.

== History ==
The origins of the Hôtel-Dieu de Montréal date to the arrival in 1642 of Paul Chomedey and a small party of French settlers on the Island of Montreal to found the French colony of Ville-Marie. Among them was Jeanne Mance, the first nurse in New France. She founded the hospital on October 8, 1645, as confirmed by letters patent of Louis XIV of France in April 1669.

In addition to returning to France to seek financial support for the hospital, in 1657 Mance recruited three sisters of the Religious Hospitallers of St. Joseph (Religieuses hospitalières de Saint-Joseph) order of nuns to serve with her as staff. Their order was founded in 1636 by a layman, Jérôme Le Royer de la Dauversière, along with Mother Marie de la Fere (fr), in La Fleche, France. Guillaume Bailly, a Sulpician missionary, is credited with drawing up the plans for the stone structure that was built in 1688.

The hospital burned and was rebuilt three times between 1695 and 1734. For two centuries, before and after the conquest of New France by the British, the Hôtel-Dieu was the only French-language hospital in Montreal. Around 1850, the hospital became affiliated with the Montreal School of Medicine and Surgery. In 1861, it was moved from Old Montreal to its present site near Mount Royal. It had an affiliated nursing school between 1901 and 1970.

In 1996, it became one of the three hospitals to make up the Centre hospitalier de l'Université de Montréal (CHUM), along with the Hôpital Notre-Dame du CHUM and the Hôpital Saint-Luc du CHUM.

With the completion of the CHUM megahospital campus adjacent to Hôpital Saint-Luc in 2017, the Hôtel-Dieu's patients were moved to the new facility as of November 5, 2017. The Hôtel-Dieu was initially slated for closure, but ultimately remained open as a large-scale urgent care clinic until 2020.

In 2020, amid the COVID-19 pandemic in Montreal, the former hospital became home to one of Montreal's largest testing sites.

The present site also contains a museum of the hospital's long history.

== Medical achievements ==
During its history, many medical milestones have been recorded at the Hôtel-Dieu, including the world's first removal of a kidney (1868), the world's first removal of a tongue and jaw (1872), the first femur transplant (1959), the first identification of an AIDS patient in Canada (1979), the world's first successful recovery of a person with severe burns to 90% of the body (1981), and the world's first robotically assisted laparoscopic surgery (1993).

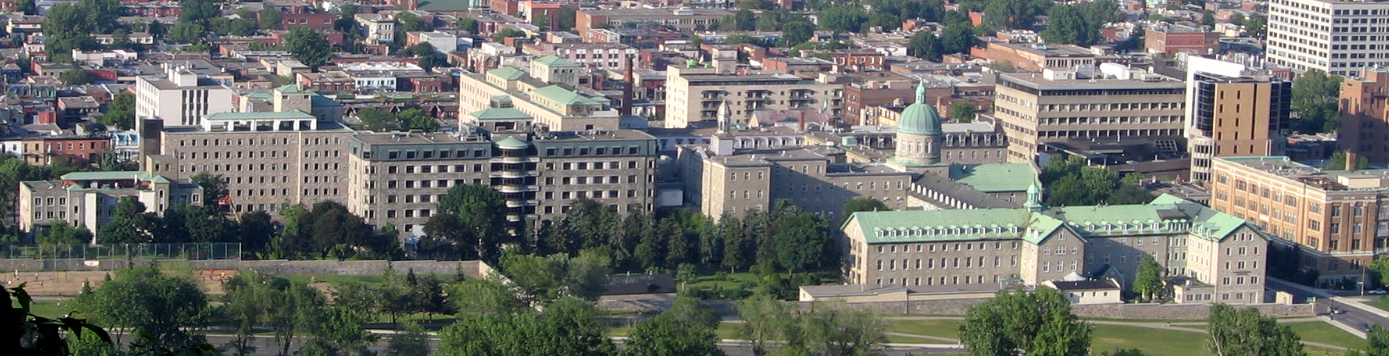
The Hôtel-Dieu campus seen from Mount Royal.
