= Jean-Jacques Olier =

17th-century French Catholic priest and founder of the Sulpicians

Abbé Jean-Jacques Olier S.S
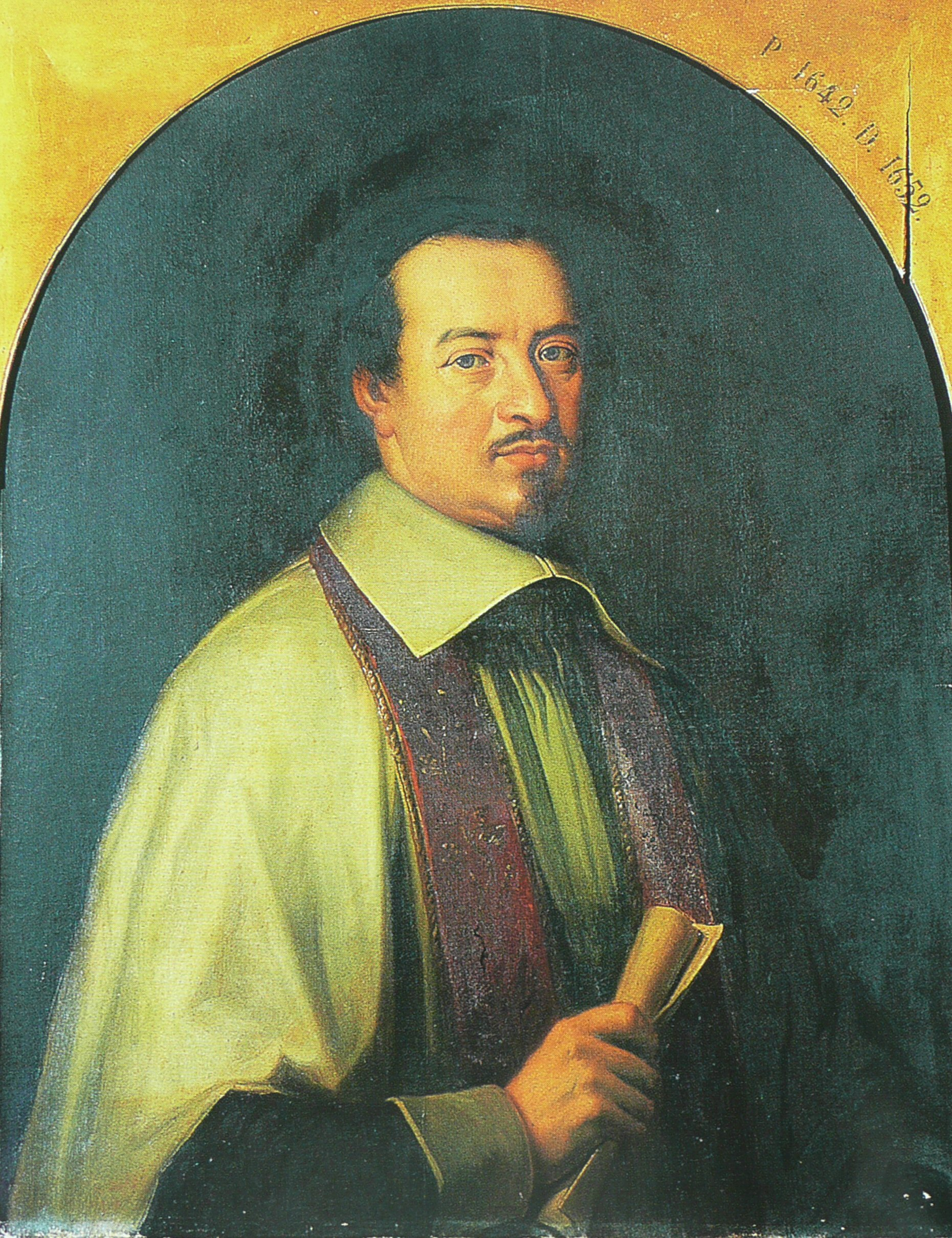
- Portrait of Jean-Jacques Olier, founder of the Society of Saint-Sulpice, by an unknown author

Orders
- Ordination: 21 May 1633

Personal details
- Born: 20 September 1608 Paris, Kingdom of France
- Died: 2 April 1657 (aged 48) Paris, Kingdom of France
- Denomination: Roman Catholic
- Education: College of Sorbonne

Jean-Jacques Olier, S.S. (20 September 1608 – 2 April 1657) was a French Catholic priest and the founder of the Sulpicians. He also helped to establish the Société Notre-Dame de Montréal, which organised the settlement of a new town called Ville-Marie (now Montreal) in the colony of New France.

== Early life ==
Olier was born in Paris, but the family moved to Lyon, where his father had become a judge. There he was given a thorough education in the classics at the local Jesuit college (1617–1625). He was encouraged to become a priest by Francis de Sales, who predicted his sanctity and great services to the Catholic Church.

In preparation for this career, Olier first studied philosophy at the College of Harcourt in Paris, then scholastic theology and patristics at the College of Sorbonne. He preached during this period, by virtue of a benefice which his father had obtained for him. The young student became a man of great ambition; he also frequented fashionable society, which caused anxiety to those interested in his spiritual welfare. He lived in the grand manner of the day, having two carriages and many servants. His success in defending theses in Latin and Greek led him to go to Rome for the purpose of learning Hebrew so as to gain greater notice by being able to defend his theses in that language at the Sorbonne.

When his eyesight began to fail, Olier made a pilgrimage to the Shrine of the Holy House in Loreto, Italy, where his official biographies attest not only to a cure, but also a complete religious conversion. For a time he considered entering the Carthusians, and visited the charterhouses in southern Italy. Upon the news of his father's death in 1631, however, he returned to Paris. Once back in the capital, he refused a chaplaincy at the royal court, with its prospect of high honours. Instead he gathered the poor and the outcast on the streets for instruction in the Catholic faith, a practice which was at first derided but soon widely imitated. Under the guidance of Vincent de Paul, Olier assisted de Paul's missionaries, both in Paris and the rural countryside, while he prepared for Holy Orders, being ordained 21 May 1633.

== Revival of religion ==
A disciple of Vincent de Paul and of Charles de Condren, Jean-Jacques Olier took part in "missions" organised by them in France. The work Condren had most at heart was the foundation of seminaries after the Counter-Reformation model mandated by the Council of Trent. The Catholic Church felt that its success in its own renewal lay in the thorough and systematic formation of the clergy through their education in these schools. The attempts in France to carry out the designs of the Council having failed, Condren, unable to succeed through the Oratory, gathered a few young ecclesiastics around him for that purpose, Olier among them. The missions in which he employed them were meant to impress on their minds the religious needs of the country.

== Parish of Saint-Sulpice ==
A first attempt to found a seminary at Chartres failed. On 29 December 1641, Olier and two others, the Abbés de Foix and du Ferrier, formed a small community at Vaugirard, then a suburban village near Paris. Others soon joined them, and before long there were eight seminarians, who followed with the priests the same rule of life and were instructed in theology, with Olier teaching Scripture. The pastor of Vaugirard took advantage of the presence of the priests in his parish to take an extended vacation, during which time they reformed his parish.

Impressed by the reports of this reform, the curé of the Church of St. Sulpice in Paris, who had become discouraged by the deplorable state of his parish, offered it in exchange for some of Olier's benefices. In August 1641, Olier took charge of the Parish of St. Sulpice. His aims were to reform the parish, establish a seminary, and Christianise the Sorbonne. This was to be achieved through the example set by the seminarians who attended its courses. The parish covered all of the Faubourg Saint-Germain-des-Prés, with a population as numerous and varied as a large city. It was commonly described as the largest and most fashionable parish in the city. There Olier trained his priests in community life. The parish name came to be identified with the society he founded.

Of special attention were the poor, the uninstructed, and those in irregular marital unions. Thirteen catechetical centres were established, for the instruction not only of children but of many adults who were almost equally ignorant of the Catholic faith. Special instructions were provided for every class of persons, for the beggars, the poor, domestic servants, midwives, workingmen, the aged, etc. Instructions and debates on Catholic doctrine were organised for the benefit of Calvinists, hundreds of whom were converted. A vigorous campaign was waged against immoral and heretical literature and obscene pictures. Pamphlets, holy pictures and prayer books were distributed to those who could or would not come to church, and a bookstore was opened at the parish church to supply good literature.

It would appear that Vincent de Paul so esteemed Olier that in February 1644 he risked the ire of Cardinal Mazarin by obtaining a benefice for Olier that Mazarin was seeking for the son of the Duke de la Rouchefoucault.

== Society of Saint-Sulpice ==
In 1645, Olier founded the Society of St. Sulpice, which established seminaries throughout France that became known for their moral and academic teaching. During the period of the Fronde (1648–1653), the civil war which reduced Paris to widespread misery and famine, Olier supported hundreds of families and provided many with clothing and shelter. None were refused. The poor were cared for according to methods of relief inspired by the practical genius of Vincent de Paul. His rules of relief, adapted in other parishes, became the accepted methods and are still followed at St. Sulpice.

At times, as many as 60 to 80 priests were ministering together in the parish, of whom the most illustrious, a little after Olier's time, was the Abbé Fénelon, later Archbishop of Cambrai. This was one of the best effects of Olier's work, for it sent trained, enlightened, zealous priests into all parts of France, and later beyond.

Orphans, very numerous during the war, were placed in good parishes, and a house of refuge established for orphan girls. A home was open to shelter and reform the many women rescued from prostitution, and another for young girls exposed to that danger. Many free schools for poor girls were founded by Olier, and he laboured also at the reform of the teachers in boys' schools, not, however, with great success.

Olier perceived that the reform of boys' schools could be accomplished only through a religious community; which in fact came about after his death through the work of Jean-Baptiste de la Salle, a former pupil of St. Sulpice. Free legal aid was provided for the poor. He also gathered under one roof the nuns from many different communities and Orders who had been driven out of their monasteries in the countryside and had fled to Paris for refuge. He cared for them until the end of the war. In the end, there was no misery among the people, spiritual or corporal, for which the pastor did not seek a remedy.

Olier led the movement against duelling, formed a society for its suppression, and enlisted the active aid of military men of renown, including the marshals of France and some famous duellists. He converted many of noble and royal blood, both men and women. He worked to overcome the common idea that Christian perfection was only for priests and religious orders, and inspired many to the practices of a devout life, including daily meditation, spiritual reading and other exercises of piety, and to a more exact fulfillment of their duties, whether at the court, in business or at home.

== Seminary of St. Sulpice ==
The second great work of Olier was the establishment of the seminary of St. Sulpice. By his parish, which he intended to serve as a model to the parochial clergy, as well as by his seminary, he hoped to help give France a worthy priesthood, through which alone, he felt, the revival of religion could come. The seminary was at first installed in the rectory of the parish, but very soon (1 October 1642) moved to a little house in the vicinity, de Foix being placed in charge by Olier. The beginnings were in great poverty, which lasted many years, for Olier would never allow any revenues from the parish to be expended except on parish needs. From the start he designed to make it a national seminary and regarded as providential the fact that the Parish of St. Sulpice, and thus the seminary, depended directly on the Holy See.

Within two years, students had come to the seminary from about twenty dioceses of France. Some attended the courses at the Sorbonne, others followed those given in the seminary itself. His seminarians were initiated into parochial work, being employed very fruitfully in teaching the catechism. At the Sorbonne their piety, it appears, had a very marked influence. After Father Olier described his model of a seminary to the Assembly of Clergy of France in 1651, bishops throughout the country asked the Sulpicians to oversee the operation of their seminaries.

At this time, Mère Marie Alvequin, superior of the Dames Augustines de St. Magloire, petitioned Olier directly and through others to undertake the responsibility of spiritual director of the monastery, but Olier preferred to focus his attentions on the parish and seminary of St. Sulpice.

== New establishments ==
The rules of Olier's seminary, approved by the General Assembly of the Clergy in 1651, were adopted in many new establishments. Within a few years, Olier, at the urgent request of the bishops, sent priests to found seminaries in several dioceses throughout the country. The first was at Nantes in 1648. It was not Olier's intention to establish a congregation to conduct seminaries, but merely to lend priests for the foundation of a seminary to any bishop and to recall them after their work was well established. The repeated requests of bishops, considered by him as indications of God's will, caused him to modify his plan, and to accept a few seminaries permanently.

The society which formed around Olier at St. Sulpice was not formed into a religious institute, but instead continued as a community of diocesan priests, following a common life but bound by no special religious vows. The aim of the society was to live perfectly the life of a diocesan priest. Olier wished it to remain a small company, decreeing that it should never consist of more than seventy-two members, besides the superior and his twelve assistants. This regulation remained in force until circumstances induced a successor, the Abbé Emery, to abolish the limitation.

== Political influence ==
Olier's influence was powerful with the Queen Regent, Anne of Austria, to whom he spoke with great plainness, yet with great respect, denouncing her prime minister, Cardinal Mazarin, as responsible for simoniacal and unworthy nominations to the episcopate. He persuaded the rich— royalty, nobles, and others— to a great generosity, without which his large works of charity would have been impossible. The foundation of the present Church of St. Sulpice was laid by him.

=== Founder of Ville-Marie in New France ===
Olier was always the missionary, with a global outlook. His zeal led to his helping in the foundation of the Society of Our Lady of Montreal. The society organised the establishment of the colony of Fort Ville-Marie in New France, the nucleus of the modern city of Montreal. The Sulpicians undertook their first overseas mission at the colony in 1657, and eventually were given the control of the seigneury of much of the colony.

== Later life ==
Olier suffered a stroke in February 1652. He resigned his pastorate into the hands of Abbé de Bretonvilliers and, when he regained sufficient strength, on the orders of his physicians he visited various spas of Europe in search of health, as well as making many pilgrimages. On his return to Paris, his old energy and enthusiasm reasserted themselves, especially in his warfare against Jansenism. A second stroke at Saint-Péray, in September 1653, left him completely paralysed.

Olier was an influential author. Besides letters, which reveal his strength as spiritual director, he wrote four books intended for his parishioners: La Journée chrétienne (1655), a Catéchisme chrétien pour la vie intérieure (1656), L'Introduction à la vie et aux vertus chrétiennes (1657), and L'Explication des cérémonies de la Grand' messe de paroisse (1657). These books, written in the years immediately before his death, are all the more remarkable as Olier was partially paralysed at that time.

Olier's last years were full of intense suffering, both bodily and mental, which he bore with the utmost sweetness and resignation. His visions and his mysticism caused the Jansenists to ridicule him as a visionary; but they, as well as others, acknowledged his sanctity. His numerous ascetical writings show him a profound master of spiritual doctrine. His friend Vincent de Paul was with him at his death.

Olier was buried in the Church of St. Sulpice. When the interior of the church was destroyed during the French Revolution, his remains were lost. Only his heart, removed per the customs of the day, is preserved in the Sulpician seminary in Issy-les-Moulineaux.

== Attempt at canonisation ==
Diocesan attempts to canonise Olier were introduced in Paris and Montreal between 1865 and 1867, but the Vatican did not proceed with the cause. Vincent de Paul regarded Olier as a saint. Writing to Mademoiselle d'Aubrai on 26 July 1660, just two months before his own death, Vincent de Paul stated that he had "asked God for great graces through the intercession of M. Olier." Church historian, Frederick William Faber, in his Growth in Holiness (Baltimore ed., p. 376) says of him: "Of all the uncanonized servants of God whose lives I have read, he most resembles a canonized Saint."

== Legacy ==
"When we look to the legacy of Jean-Jacques Olier," Donald Cardinal Wuerl, Archbishop of Washington and Chancellor of the Catholic University of America, has said, "we can find three enduring elements: the priests of the Society of St. Sulpice, the structure of seminary formation and the outline of the spirituality for the diocesan priest."

== Bibliography ==
=== Works ===
- Lettres de M. Olier, 2 vol., ed. E. Levesque, de Gigord, Paris, 1935.
- Le catéchisme chrétien et La journée chrétienne, ed. F. Amiot, Le Rameau, Paris, 1954.
- Introduction à la vie et aux vertus chrétiennes, ed. F. Amiot, Le Rameau, Paris, 1954.
- Le traité des Saints Ordres, comparé aux écrits authentiques de Jean-Jacques Olier († 1657), ed. G. Chaillot, P; Cochois, I. Noye, Procure de la Compagnie de Saint-Sulpice, Paris, 1984.
- L’Esprit des cérémonies de la messe, ed. C. Barthe, Le Forum, Perpignan, 2004.
- L'Ame cristal. Des Attributs divins en nous, ed. Mariel Mazzocco, Paris, Editions du Seuil, 2008.
- De La Création du monde à La Vie divine, ed. M. Mazzocco, Paris, Editions du Seuil, 2009.
- Des anges. Fragrances divines et odeurs suaves, ed. M. Mazzocco, Paris, Editions du Seuil, 2011.
- Tentations diaboliques et Possession divine, ed. M. Mazzocco, Paris, Champion, 2012.

=== Monographs and articles ===
- Michel Dupuy, Se laisser à l'Esprit. Itinéraire spirituel de Jean-Jacques Olier, Paris, Cerf, 1982.
- Mariel Mazzocco, I volti del nulla tra le pagine di Jean-Jacques Olier, in Rivista di Storia e Letteratura Religiosa, Olschki, Firenze, 2009, vol. 45, n° 1, pp. 53–84 .
- Mariel Mazzocco, Note di semplicità: gli appunti spirituali di Jean-Jacques Olier, in Rivista di Storia e Letteratura Religiosa, Olschki, Firenze, 2010, vol. 46, n° 1, pp. 59–101.
- (Various Authors), Jean-Jacques Olier : Homme de talent, serviteur de l'Evangile (1608–1657), ed. M. Vidal, Paris, Desclée de Brouwer, 2010.
- Mariel Mazzocco, Les petits mots d'un aventurier mystique, in Tentations diaboliques et possession divine, Paris, Champion, 2012.

== See also ==
- French school of spirituality
