= Société Notre-Dame de Montréal =

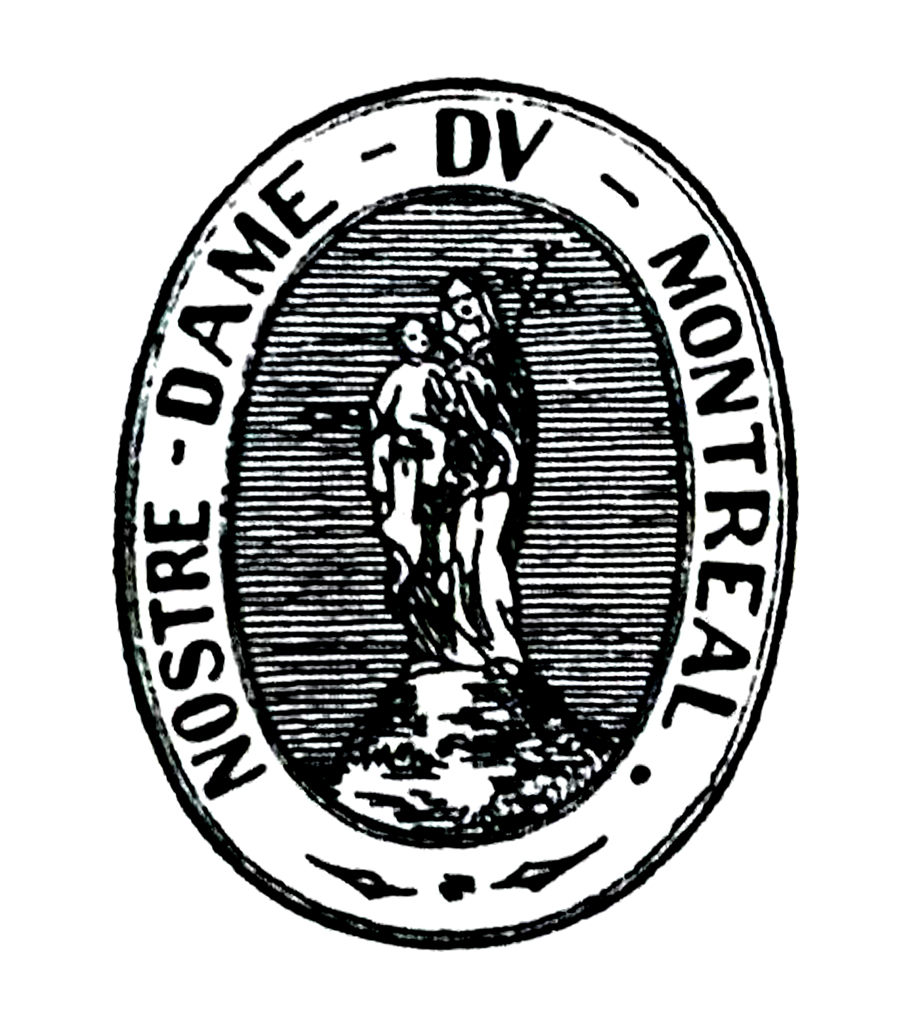
- Seal of the organization, c. 1650
- Formation: 1639
- Dissolved: 1663
- Type: Religious organization
- Legal status: Association
- Purpose: The foundation of Fort Ville-Marie
- Headquarters: Paris
- Region served: Montreal Island
- Official language: French
- Leaders: Jérôme le Royer de la Dauversière; Jean-Jacques Olier; Jeanne Mance; Paul de Chomedey, Sieur de Maisonneuve; Pierre Chevrier

The Société Notre-Dame de Montréal (French pronunciation: [sɔsjete nɔtʁə dam də mɔ̃ʁeal]), otherwise known as the Société de Notre-Dame de Montréal pour la conversion des Sauvages de la Nouvelle-France, was a religious organization responsible for founding Ville-Marie, the original name for the settlement that would later become Montreal. The original founders of the organization were Jérôme le Royer de la Dauversière, Jean-Jacques Olier and Pierre Chevrier. They were later joined by Paul de Chomedey, Sieur de Maisonneuve, and by Jeanne Mance. The organization's mission was to convert the Indigenous population to Christianity and found a Christian settlement, which would be known as Ville-Marie.

== Founding and activities ==
Marie-Madeleine de Vignerot, the Duchess of Aiguillon, a strong lay leader of the Catholic Church, was a proponent of foreign missionaries. To develop a colony in Montreal, she instigated the formation of the Societe Notre-Dame de Montreal. Her ideas caught the attention of Jérôme le Royer de la Dauversière, Pierre Chevrier, Baron de Fanchamp and Jeanne Mance, who expressed great interest and enthusiasm. A friend of Chevrier, Jean-Jacques Olier, future founder of the Seminary of St-Sulpice also expressed great interest in the project, donating a hundred pistoles to de la Dauversière and telling him to "commence the work of God." Olier was also instrumental in recruiting three more associates to the Society, most notably the Baron de Renty. He played an important financial role as a financial benefactor for the project. These six individuals would form the core of the Société Notre-Dame de Montréal.

They intended to establish the colony for the purpose of the religious conversion of the Indigenous population, whom they considered pagans, and the development of a Christian settlement. The venture was very expensive, and the Society initially had trouble finding potential financiers.

The next step was to acquire the rights to the Island of Montreal. At the time, the entire island had been ceded to a Jean de Lauson, the intendant of Dauphiné. Through negotiations with de Lauson, the territory was formally ceded to de la Dauvisière and Chevrier on 17 December 1640. On the very same day the Society engaged itself to transport thirty men, and thirty tons of provisions to New France by its own means and vessels.

Planning for the eventual colonial project would take over the activities of the Society for the next year. This planning was extensive, meticulous, and closely modelled after the Quebec settlement. Ville-Marie, as the settlement was to be called, largely copied its three main institutions from the Quebec settlement. These were the clergy residences, a hospital, and a school for young Natives. The next step for the Society was to choose a secular governor for the new colony. For this they required a man with certain military capabilities, proven leadership, and notable piety. The man chosen to for the job was Paul de Chomedey, Sieur de Maisonneuve, who had a reputation for excellent military strategy, as well as piety. The King of France, Louis XIII, in recognizing the cessation of the Island of Montreal to the Society, also named de Maisonneuve the Governor of the settlement and granted him the right to use artillery and other munitions of war. De Maisonneuve and Chevrier were then jointly tasked with the provision of equipment, rations, munitions, skilled workers, and soldiers needed for the colony.

From its inception the Society needed the presence of women in its colonial project. The establishment of a hospital was a key priority of the Society. Caring for the sick and wounded during this period was largely seen as women's work. Needing female caregivers who could also evangelize, the Society eventually took on four women, the most notable of which was Jeanne Mance. Mance was instrumental to the success of the society, as both a caregiver and as a financier. Though she had little of her own wealth to give to the mission, her resourcefulness in spreading the word of the Society to wealthy aristocratic women in Paris paid off greatly in the future donations these women gave to the colonial project.

In the spring of 1641 three ships departed from La Rochelle to the New World with the mission of establishing a Christian colony on the Island of Montreal. One ship contained de Maisonneuve and about twenty five men, a second ship containing Jeanne Mance and a dozen men, and a third containing three women and ten men. The third ship arrived without issue and the second, containing Jeanne Mance, reached Quebec on August 8, 1641. de Maisonneuve's journey, wrought by misfortune and poor weather, caused him to lose several men and delay his arrival until August 20. De Maisonneuve's two-week absence gave rise to ridicule of the Society's mission in New France. Public and elite opinion in Quebec began to center around talks of the mission as a "foolhardy enterprise". This opinion garnered much credibility from the recent skirmishes between Iroquois and the French, which led many to believe that the settlement, having so few men to defend it, would soon be destroyed by the Iroquois. Despite the ridicule his venture received, De Maisonneuve would have carried out his mission of colonization except for the coming winter weather. The expedition's arrival in late August had delayed the colonial project considerably. Given the recent Iroquois threat and the coming frost, de Maisonneuve decided to suspend the founding of Ville Marie until next spring, spending the winter in Ste-Foye with his crew. During the winter, Mance played a critical role in managing and storing the supplies.

Over the course of the winter and early spring, boat construction went on busily in Ste-Foye. On May 8, 1642, de Maisonneuve's colonizing force set out for the Island of Montreal. The Flotilla consisted of a pinnacle, a Garbarre, and two Chaloupes. On the 17th of May, the Society came into sight of the island and formally took possession of it. The next morning they made their landing at La Place Royale, an islet at the mouth of the stream which Samuel de Champlain had previously designated as a safe haven. De Maisonneuve decided that on this spot would be where he erected his fort and settlement. That day an altar was erected by Jeanne Mance and the first Mass was held on the Island of Montreal. This act symbolized the beginning of Ville Marie, the ambitious dream of La Société Notre-Dame de Montréal.

== Early encounters with Natives ==
From the beginning, the area where the Society was founded was prone to attacks by neighboring Iroquois tribes, primarily the Mohawk Nation, that dominated this area. In 1650, Paul Chomedey de Maisonneuve returned to New France, after a trip to France during which he met with Jeanne Mance. Mance warned de Maisonneuve of the destruction of Huronia by the Iroquois. Huron survivors of the attack fled before the onslaught and "passed by Ville Marie on their way to safety at Quebec – a sinister omen of things to come."

On May 6, 1651, Jean Boudart and his wife were attacked by approximately 50 natives. Boudart was killed and his wife was taken prisoner and later burnt at the stake. Charles Le Moyne, Denis Archambault and an unnamed settler quickly ran in aid of the others under attack. The three men realized they were outnumbered and to survive, they ran to the Hotel de Dieu hospital. As historian Henri Béchard writes, later, de Maisonneuve told the founder of Montreal, "had the Iroquois passed by the hospital before these men found refuge in it, they would have plundered, burnt it, and captured Mademoiselle Mance." Four days later, on May 10, forty Iroquois attempted to set fire to the brewery and other buildings, mostly houses. The four guards patrolling the area effectively repelled the Iroquois from the brewery.

On June 18, 1651, four colonists heading home from mass were confronted by a group of Iroquois. When Governor Paul Chomedey de Maisonneuve learned of the attack, he sent a relief party led by Charles Le Moyne to reinforce security in the area. The Iroquois quickly fired all of their ammunition, and with few weapons left operating, the French were able to suppress the attack. From this moment on, "the French were constantly harassed by the Iroquois and they no longer dared venture more than a few feet from their log-houses without their muskets, their pistols and swords. At night-time, nobody opened the door of his home to anyone."

After the attacks, de Maisonneuve called a meeting of the French colonists and families in Ville-Marie. He directed them to repair the fort and their dwellings. As Dollier de Casson wrote, "as we grew weaker daily whilst the enemy grew bolder, on account of their great number, everyone saw quite plainly that unless powerful aid appeared very shortly from France, all would be lost."

Before departing for France in 1651, de Maisonneuve met with the new governor of Ville-Marie, Jean de Lauson, also a member of the Society of Notre Dame. De Lauson agreed to cover part of the cost of sending ten soldiers to reinforce the garrison at Ville-Marie. Lauson failed to fulfill his commitment. He sent three men who were extremely malnourished and unprepared for the winter. They reportedly nearly died before reaching the settlement on December 10, 1651.

While returning to Paris, de Maisonneuve stopped at La Fleche to discuss conditions with Jérôme le Royer de la Dauversière. De Maisonneuve reported on life at Ville-Marie, including the deaths caused by Iroquois attacks. The population of Ville-Marie was on the decline; approximately 50 French colonists survived, only 17 of whom could bear arms. De Maisonneuve remained in France until 1652.

Jeanne Mance remained in Ville-Marie, where he received a letter from de Maisonneuve saying, "I will try to bring back 200 men, which we badly need for the defence of this place; if, however, I cannot get at least 100, I will not return and the whole enterprise must be abandoned, for certainly the place will be untenable." It was not until 1653 that de Maisonneuve, working with de la Dauversiere in France, recruited enough French men and women willing to take the voyage to New France. In the third week of June 1653, Marguerite Bourgeoys was among prospective colonists who boarded the Saint Nicolas de Nantes. Despite suffering the loss of eight men during the voyage, on 16 November, Saint Nicolas de Nantes reached Ville-Marie with approximately 95 recruits, the . Historian Marcel Trudel regards the efforts of Jérôme le Royer de la Dauversière, Paul de Chomedey de Maisonneuve and Jeanne Mance as essential to the "second founding of Montreal." This so-called "second founding of Montreal" is historically recognized as the rebuilding of the Ville-Marie settlement by members of the Society of Notre Dame after countless Iroquois attacks.

== Dissolution ==
"We now come to a year which Montreal ought to mark in red letters on its calendar, on an account of the various losses sustained on several different occasions", wrote François Dollier de Casson in his memoirs in the fall of 1659. The Society of Notre Dame had declined and the Seminary of Saint Sulpice began taking over the administration of Ville-Marie. Within four years of Dollier de Casson's discouraging account of his time in Montreal, the Society of Notre Dame would sign over the seigneury of Montreal to the Sulpician Order. This concluded the ambitious religious project originally envisioned and funded by Jérôme le Royer de la Dauversière and his followers.

By the mid seventeenth century, The Society of Notre Dame had no more than 12 surviving members, passionately led by Paul de Chomedey, Sieur De Maisonneuve. Resources were dauntingly low and money was quickly running out during a time when the Native raids called for a formidable resistance by the Frenchmen. The Iroquois forces proved resilient and capable, and fought in much larger numbers than the French population of Ville-Marie could handle. The Native warriors used the landscape to their advantage, hiding in dense unplowed fields and setting traps for unsuspecting Frenchmen. Lambert Closse, de Maisonneuve's first lieutenant, was ambushed and murdered on February 6, 1662, an event recognized by Montrealers as a major blow to the Society of Notre Dame. This style of guerilla warfare struck fear in both villagers and soldiers of Ville-Marie, as attacks were unexpected and relentless as explicitly described in Dollier de Casson's manuscripts. The anxiety of inevitable attacks burdened Ville-Marie both militarily and agriculturally. "Montrealers had been able to seed only part their fields the previous year, so that the year 1662 had barely begun when they found that they did not have enough food to sustain the settlement." That year, Ville-Marie appealed to Quebec for provisions, receiving aid from their allies quickly. Despite the strength and fortification of Quebec, Montreal was too far away to have benefitted greatly from its protection.

On March 9, 1663 the Society of Notre Dame dissolved, leaving Ville-Marie in the hands of The Sulpician Order. However, de Maisonneuve remained Governor of the island until 1665. Ville-Marie was founded 34 years after Quebec, yet this mission successfully managed a population of over 500 people. Remarkably, this population figure was equal to that of Quebec. The Society of Notre Dame "managed to keep their settlement unconquered by the Iroquois for twenty-three years, all while increasing tenfold its population, its resources, and its strength." Despite the devastating failure of the overambitious mission of the Society, they laid the foundation for what would grow into the largest trading settlement in Canada, and established Christianity in the most impossible conditions.

== Gallery ==
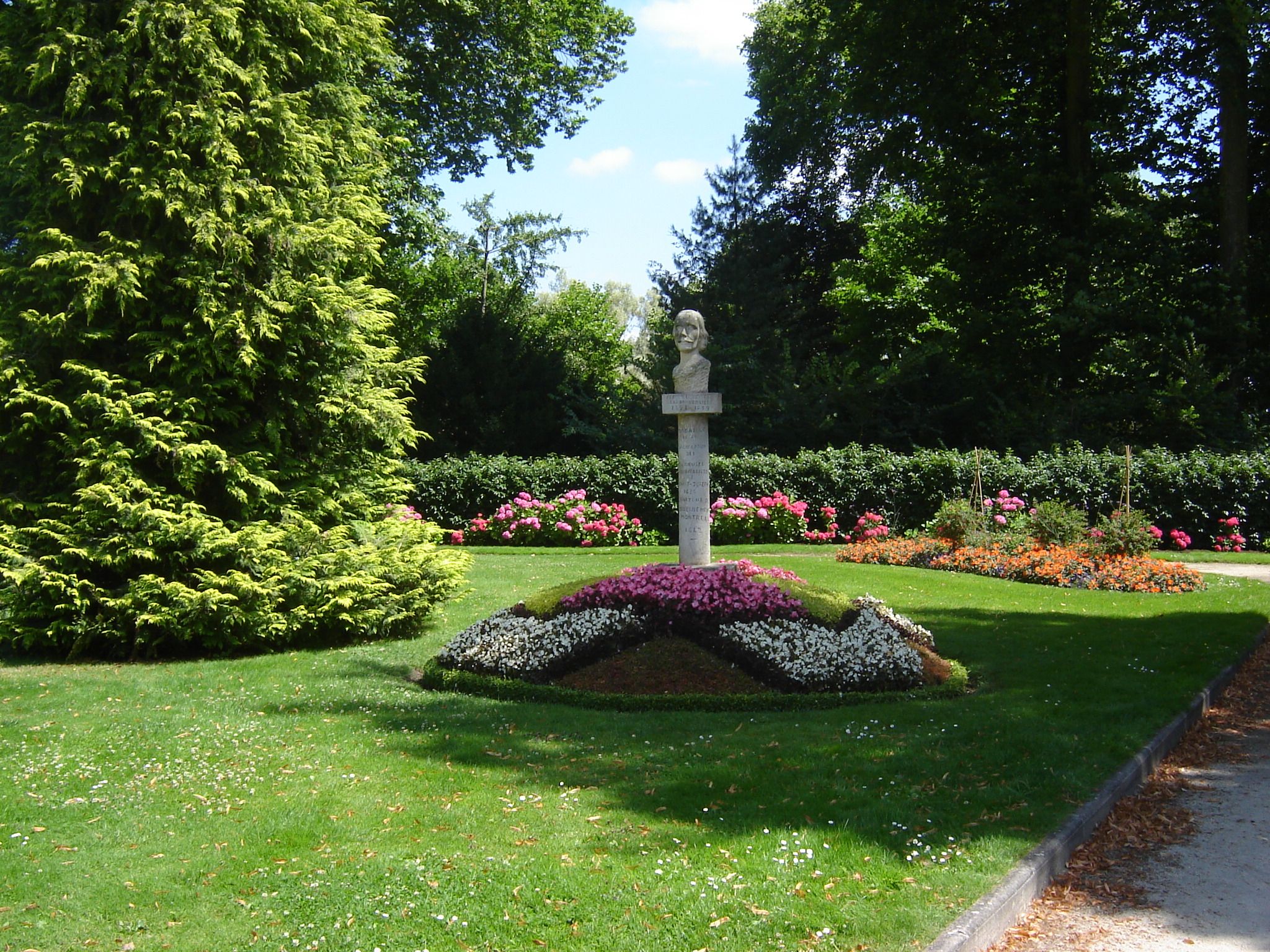
Bust of Jérôme le Royer de la Dauversière

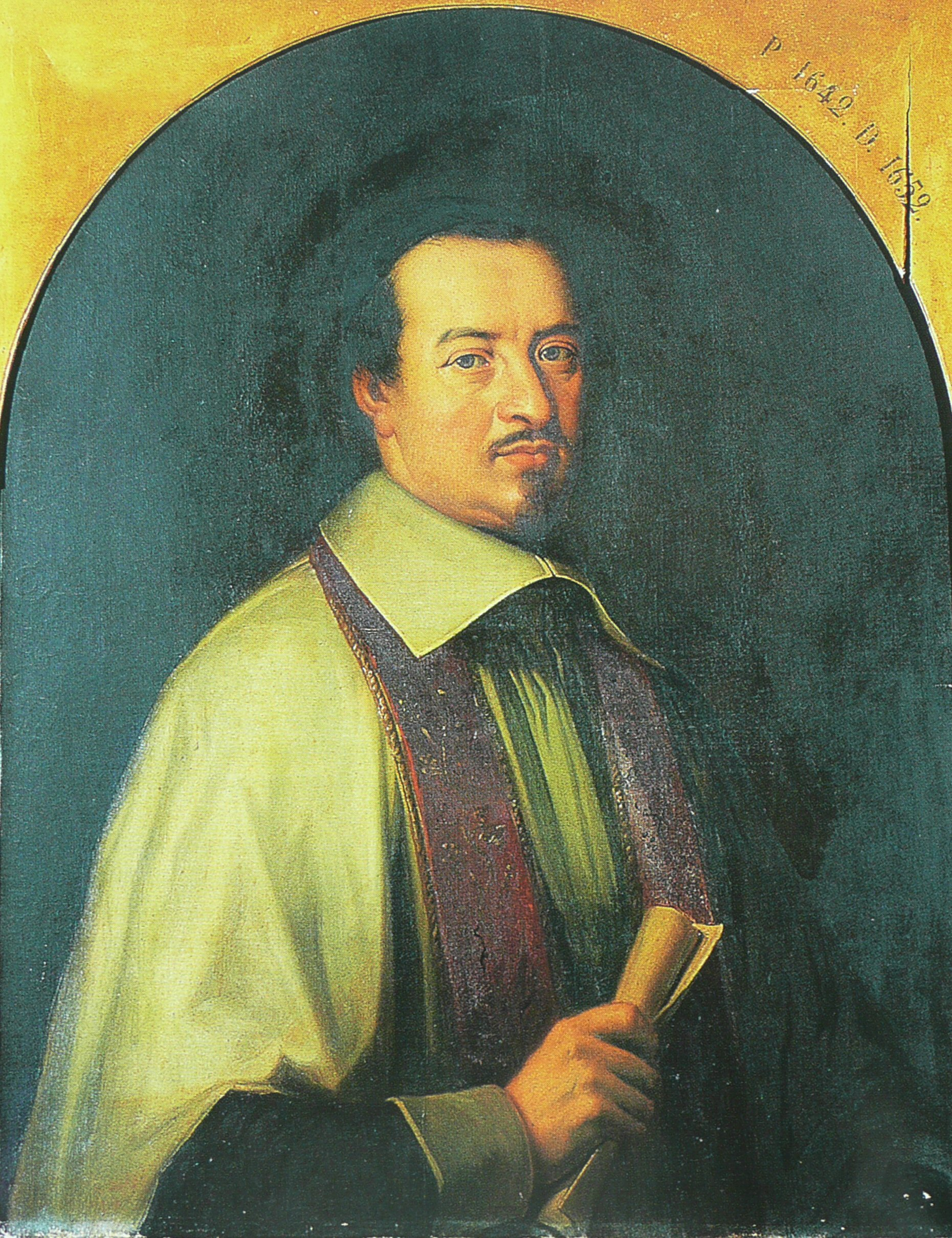
Jean-Jacques Olier

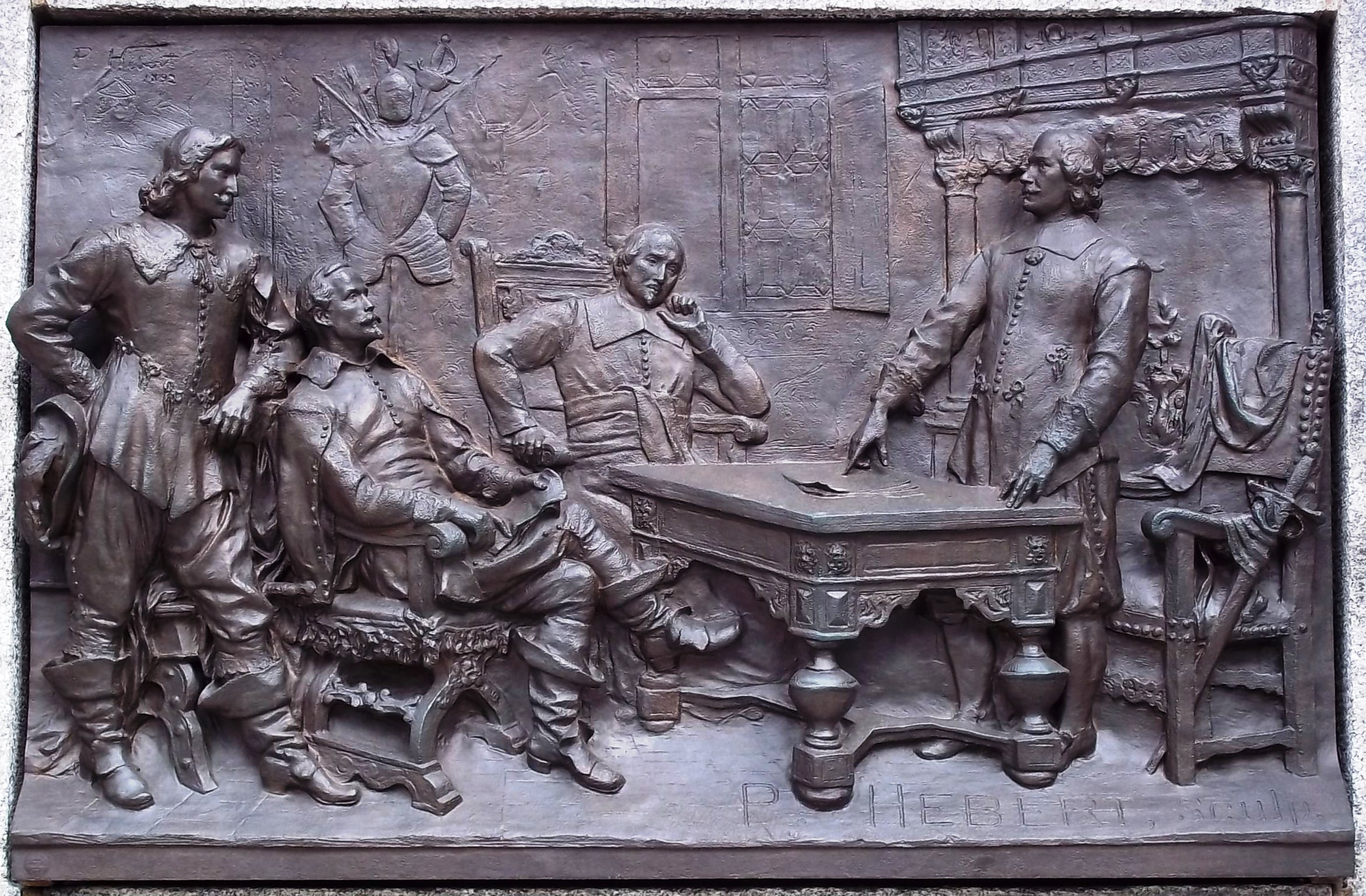
Gaston de Rentry, Pierre Chevrier, baron de Fancamp, Jean-Jacques Olier, and Jérôme le Royer de la Dauversière

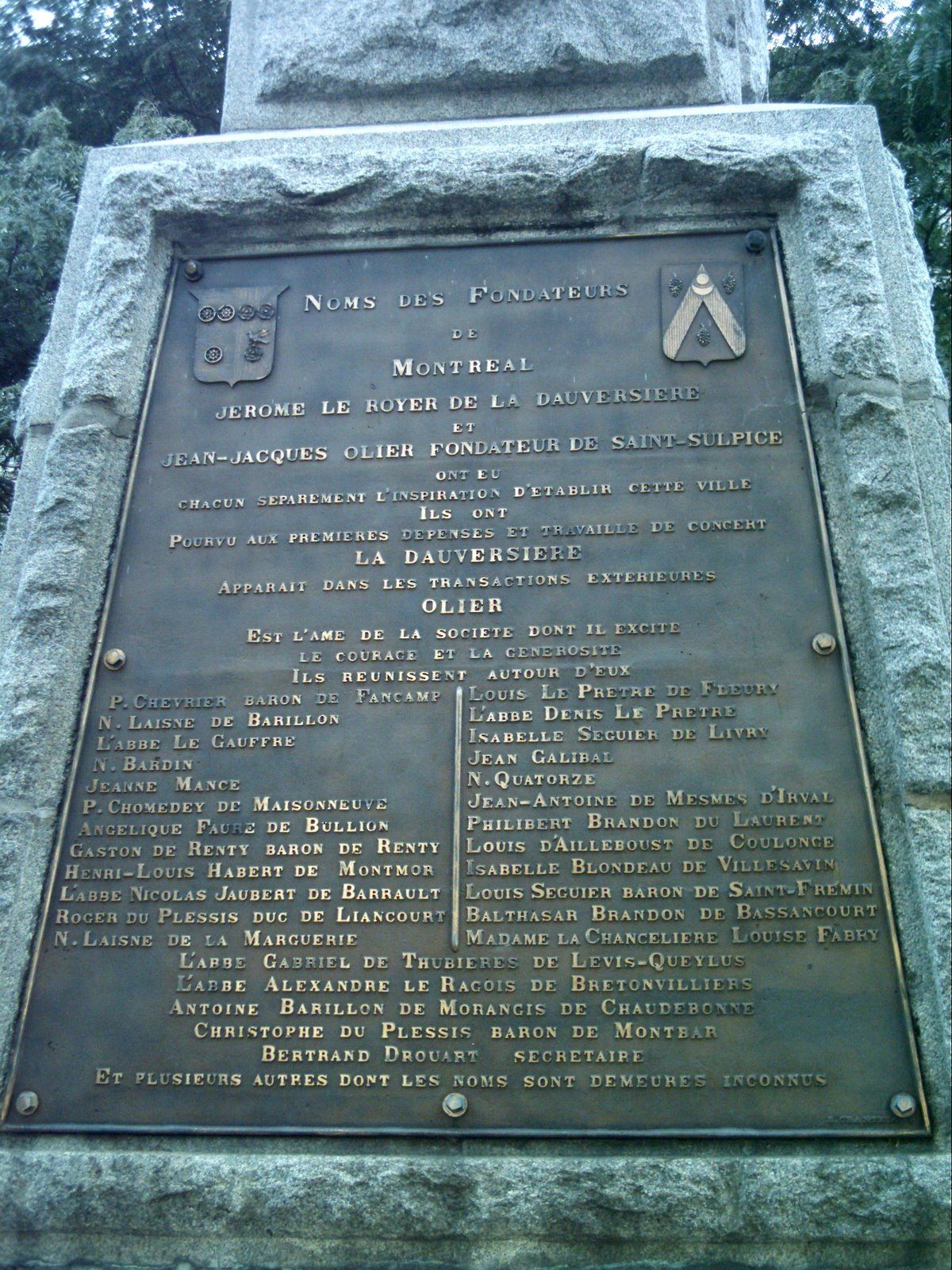
Montreal founders

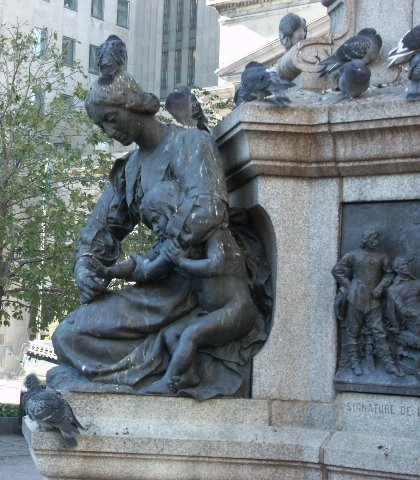
Jeanne Mance

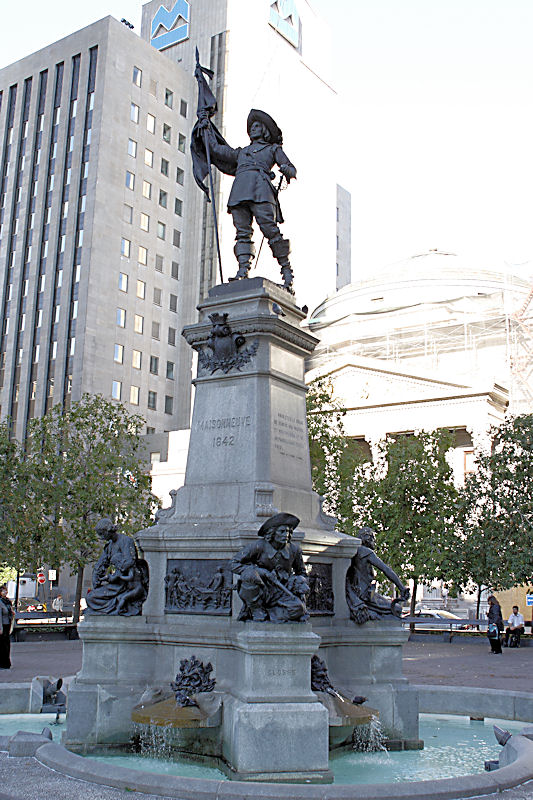
Paul Chomedey de Maisonneuve

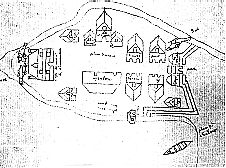
Ville-Marie in 1647
