= Jeanne Mance =

17th-century French nurse and settler in Quebec, New France

The Venerable Jeanne Mance
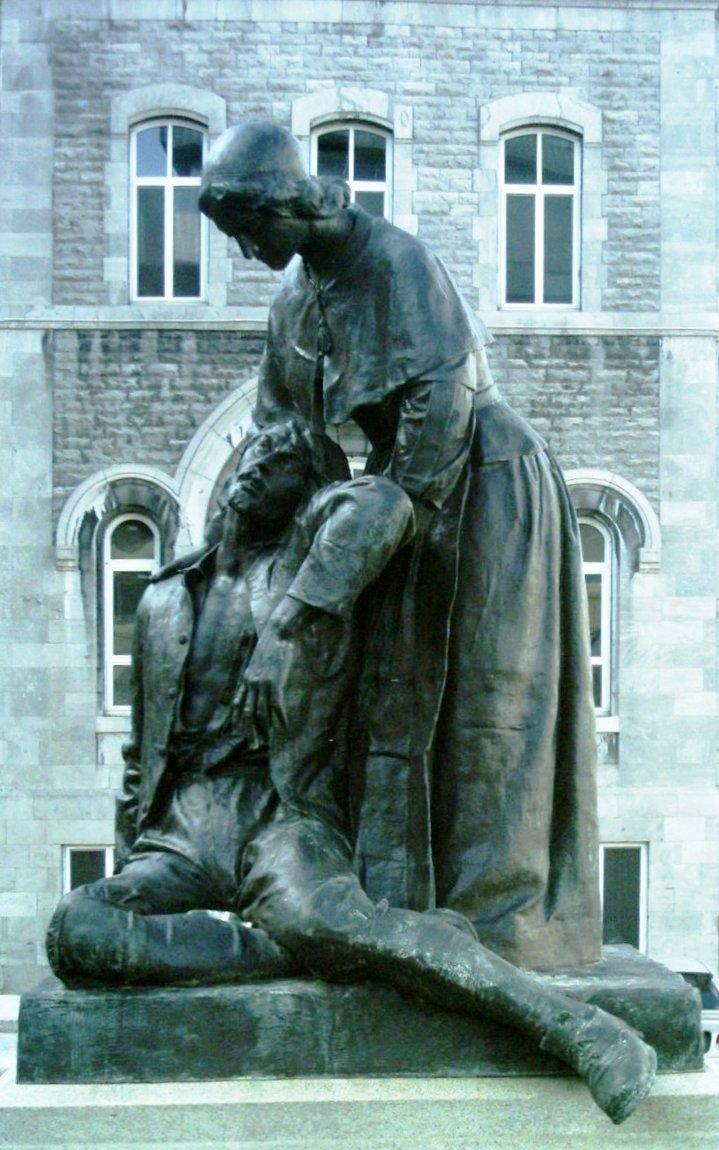
- Monument to Jeanne Mance, sculpted by Louis-Philippe Hebert, in front of the Hotel-Dieu de Montreal
- Born: Jehanne Mance; November 12, 1606; Langres, France
- Hometown: Langres, France
- Died: June 18, 1673 (aged 66); Ville-Marie, New France
- Resting place: Hôtel-Dieu de Montréal; 45.514587°N 73.578937°W
- Venerated in: Catholic Church

Jeanne Mance
- Occupation: Nurse
- Known for: Founder of the Hotel-Dieu de Montreal; cofounder of Montreal
- Parent(s): Catherine Emonnot; Charles Mance

Jeanne Mance (French pronunciation: [ʒan mɑ̃s]; November 12, 1606 – June 18, 1673) was a French nurse and settler of New France. She arrived in New France two years after the Ursuline nuns came to Quebec. Among the founders of Montreal in 1642, she established its first hospital, the Hotel-Dieu de Montreal, in 1645. She returned twice to France to seek financial support for the hospital. After providing most of the care directly for years, in 1657 she recruited three sisters of the Religieuses hospitalieres de Saint-Joseph and continued to direct operations of the hospital. During her era, she was also known as Jehanne Mance by the French, and as Joan Mance by the English.

== Early years ==
Jeanne Mance was born on 12 November 1606 in the fortified cathedral city of Langres in northeastern France, and was baptized the same day at the parish church of Saint-Pierre-Saint-Paul. Her baptism record, which survives in the parish register of Saint-Pierre-Saint-Paul, lists her under the contemporary spelling Jehanne and identifies her godparents as Antoine Esprit, a royal sergeant, and Catherine Gillot, the wife of Jean Haulteplein.

She was the second of twelve children born to Charles Mance and Catherine Emonnot. Her father worked as a royal prosecutor in Langres, an important episcopal centre, and her mother came from a family involved in legal work, including her grandfather Laurent Emonnot, who served as a legal officer. These ties placed the Mance household within the bourgeoisie de robe, the class of trained professionals who staffed the French legal system. Several relatives in the extended family were ecclesiastics who had travelled to New France.

As a teenager, Mance experienced a serious illness around the age of sixteen and recovered only narrowly. Later accounts describe her health as fragile for the rest of her life.

Her parents died when she was in her early twenties: her father in 1630 and her mother in 1632. These deaths left Mance and her older sister Marguerite responsible for supporting their many younger siblings and managing the household connected to their father's legal work.

Mance showed no desire to enter a religious order or to marry, the customary paths for women of her social class. Instead, she turned toward caregiving. In the 1630s, Langres was affected by the Thirty Years' War and repeated outbreaks of plague. Mance learned practical skills by tending to the sick, the wounded and the displaced. This work placed her within lay charitable networks shaped by early modern Catholic culture. Her experiences during the war and the epidemics formed the foundation of the vocation she would later pursue.

== Vocation ==
At age 34, while on a pilgrimage to Troyes in Champagne, Mance discovered her missionary calling. She decided to go to New France in North America, then in the first stages of colonization by the French. She was supported by Anne of Austria, the wife of King Louis XIII, and by the Jesuits. She was not interested in marriage in Nouvelle-France.

Mance was a member of the Société Notre-Dame de Montréal; its goal was to convert the natives and found a hospital in Montreal similar to the one in Quebec.

== Founding of Montreal and Hôtel-Dieu Hospital ==
Charles Lallemant recruited Jeanne Mance for the Société Notre-Dame de Montréal. Mance embarked from La Rochelle on May 9, 1641, on a crossing of the Atlantic that took three months. After wintering in Quebec, she and Paul Chomedey de Maisonneuve arrived at the Island of Montreal in the spring of 1642. They founded the new city on May 17, 1642, on land granted by the Governor. That same year Mance began operating a hospital in her home.

Three years later (1645), with a donation of 6000 francs by Angélique Bullion, she opened a hospital on Rue Saint-Paul. She directed its operations for 17 years. A new stone structure was built in 1688, and others have been built since then.

== Later years ==
In 1650, Mance visited France, returning with 22,000 French livres from Duchesse d’Aiguillon to fund the hospital (which later, was increased to 40,500 livres). On her return to Montreal, she found that the attacks of the Iroquois threatened the colony and loaned the hospital money to M. de Maisonneuve, who returned to France to organize a force of one hundred men for the colony's defense.

Mance made a second trip to France in 1657 to seek financial assistance for the hospital. At the same time, she secured three Hospital Sisters of the Religious Hospitallers of St. Joseph from the convent of La Fleche in Anjou: Judith Moreau de Bresoles, Catherine Mace, and Marie Maillet. They had a difficult passage on the return, made worse by an outbreak of the plague on board, but all four women survived. While Mgr. de Laval tried to retain the sisters at Quebec for that hospital, they eventually reached Montreal in October 1659.

With the help of the new sisters, Mance was able to ensure the continued operations of the hospital. For the rest of her years, she lived more quietly.

She died in 1673 and was buried in the church of the Hôtel-Dieu Hospital, her hospital. While the church and her house were demolished in 1696 for redevelopment, her work was carried on by the Religious Hospitallers of St. Joseph. The three nuns whom she had recruited in 1659 served as hospital administrators. Two centuries later, in 1861, the hospital was moved to the foot of Mount Royal.

== Legacy ==
The Propaganda Committee for the Beatification of Jeanne Mance was established on May 15, 1943. In 1946, the bishops of Quebec added Mance to the list of Founders of the Canadian Church. Research into her life continued over the next several decades, and a formal position was submitted to Rome in 1995. Her case was accepted in 1997. In 2013, "theologians gave unanimous approval to the heroic virtues of Jeanne Mance," and she was declared Venerable by Pope Francis on November 7, 2014.

- A small statuette (2008) representing Jeanne Mance by André Gauthier was commissioned for the Canadian Nurses Association for a biannual award of nursing excellence.
- Rue Jeanne-Mance, a north–south street in Montreal, is named after Mance.
- Jeanne-Mance Park, situated on Park Avenue, opposite Mount Royal, and just south of Mount Royal Avenue, is named after Mance.
- Jeanne-Mance, a district of Plateau Mont-Royal
- Jeanne-Mance Building, situated on Eglantine Driveway, Tunneys Pasture, Ottawa, Ontario, Canada. A Federal Government of Canada Office Tower currently occupied by Health Canada.
- Jeanne Mance Hall is a dormitory on the campus of University of Vermont. It is situated across the street from the student health center.
- A statue (1968) was erected in the Square Olivier-Lahalle in her hometown of Langres by the Association Langres – Montréal.

== Gallery ==
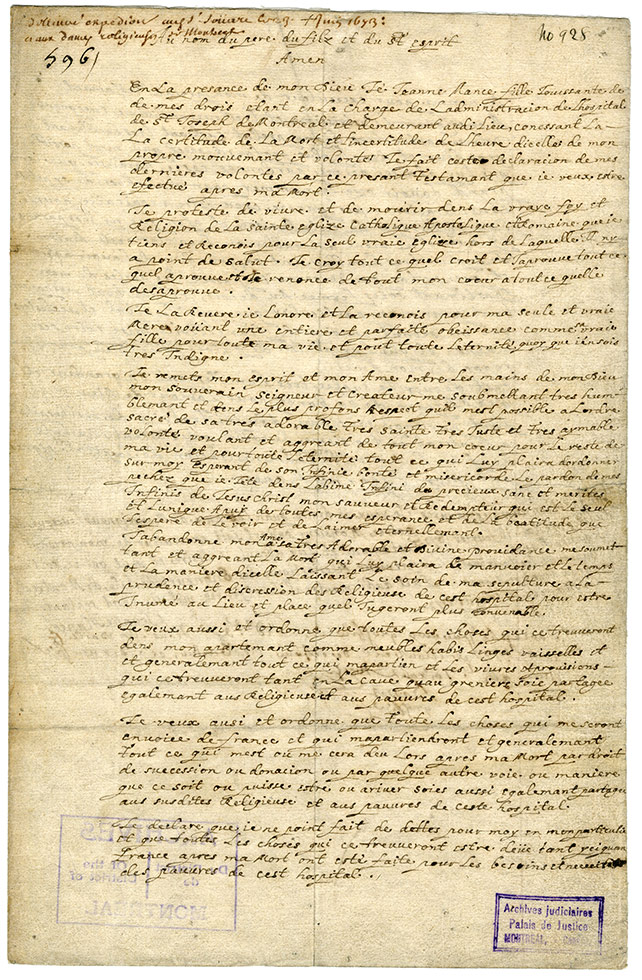
Testament, recto

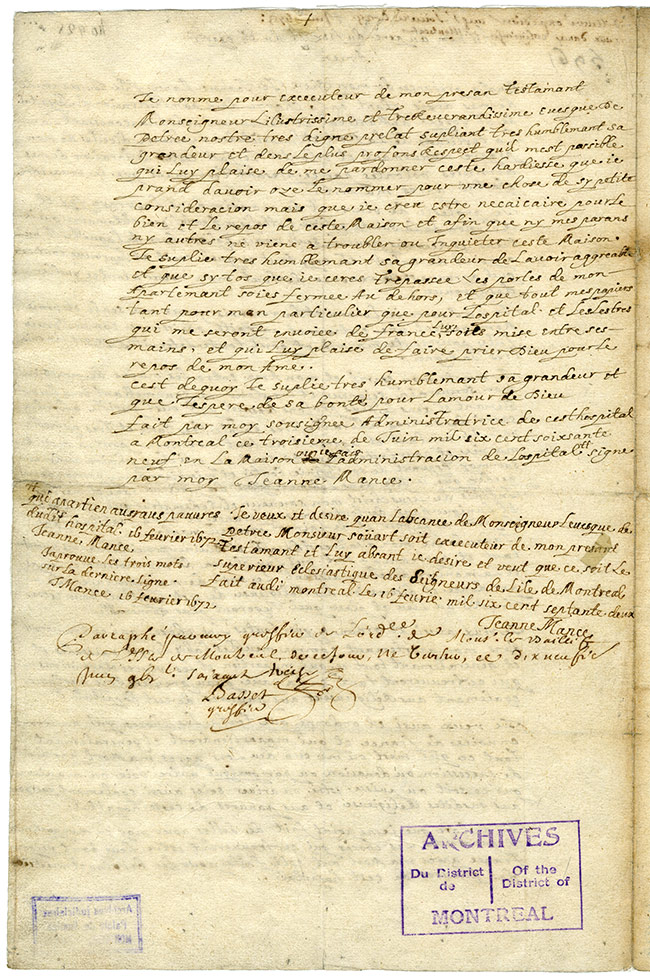
Testament, verso

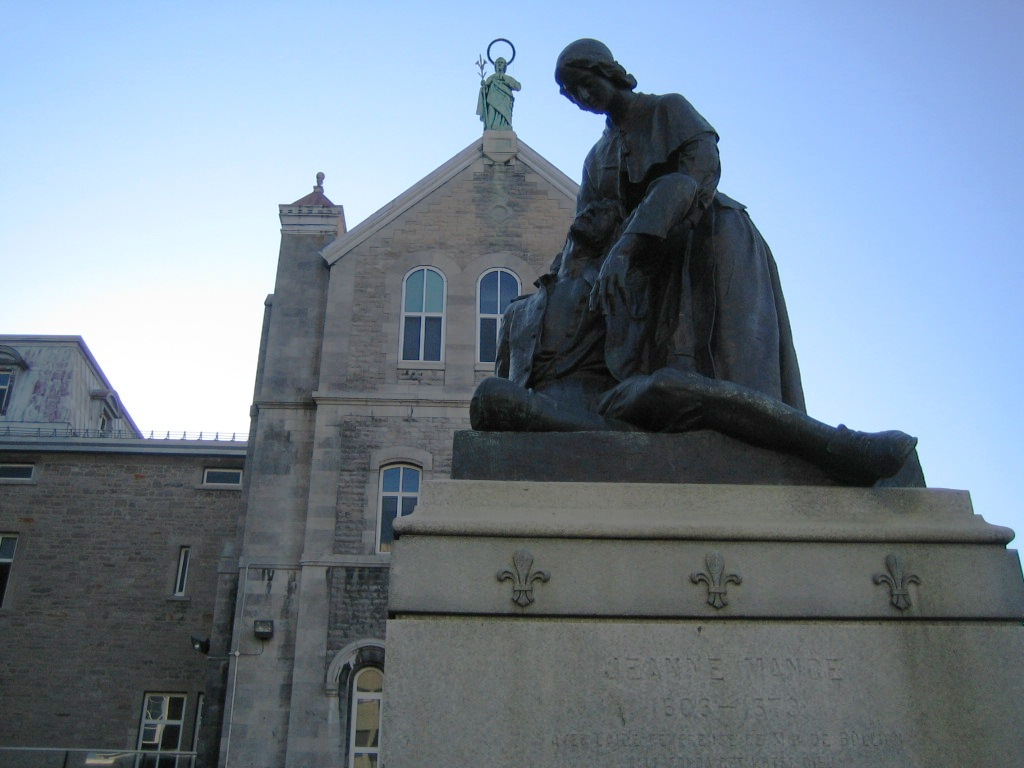
Jeanne Mance Monument

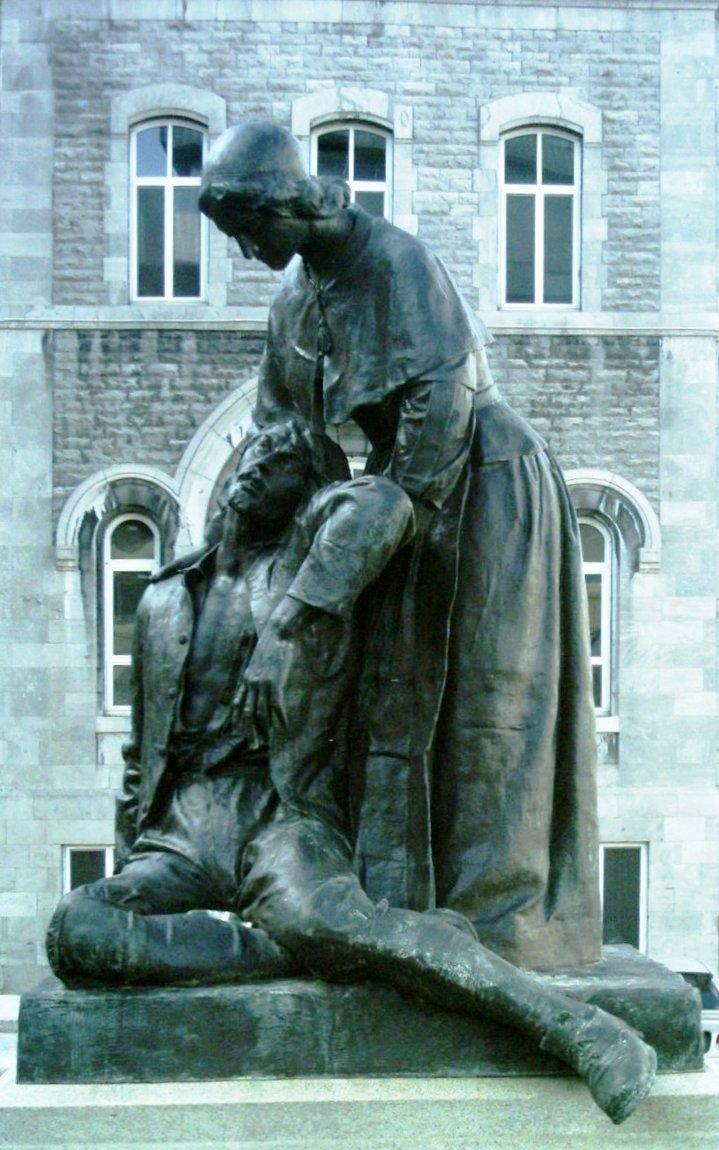
Her statue at Hôtel-Dieu de Montréal
