= Fort Ville-Marie =

17th c. French fort

- Part of Pointe-à-Callière Museum
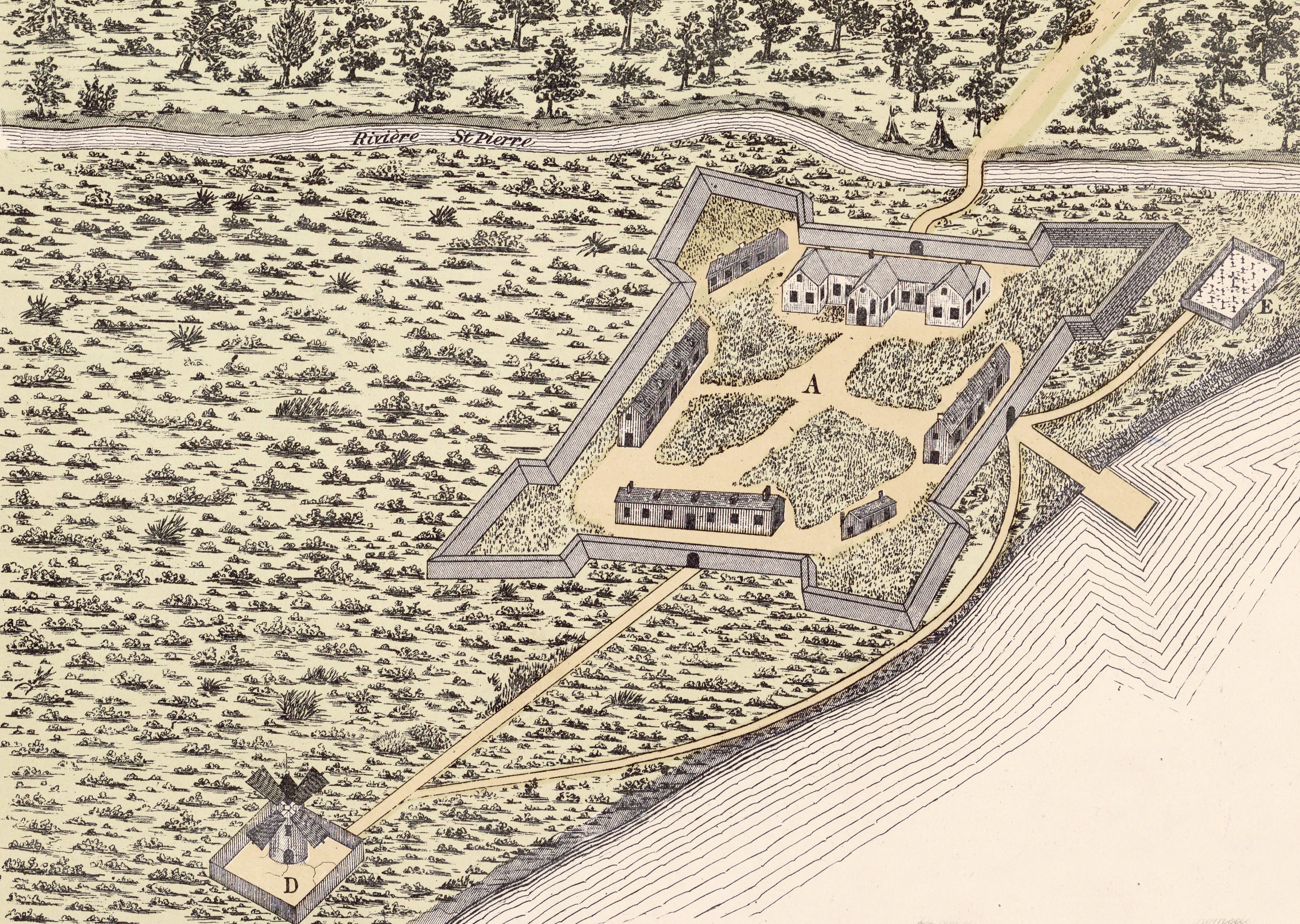
- Fort Ville-Marie in 1645

Site information
- Owner: Pointe-à-Callière Museum
- Controlled by: Société de Notre-Dame de Montréal, New France

Location
- Location within Central Quebec
- Coordinates: 45°30′09″N 73°33′15″W

Site history
- Built: 1642
- Built by: Société de Notre-Dame de Montréal
- In use: 1611, 1642–1674
- Materials: Wood
- Demolished: 1688

Garrison information
- Past commanders: Paul Chomedey de Maisonneuve

Fort Ville-Marie was a French fortress and settlement established in May 1642 by a company of French settlers, led by Paul de Chomedey de Maisonneuve, on the Island of Montreal in the Saint Lawrence River at the confluence of the Ottawa River, in what is today the province of Quebec, Canada. Its name is French for "City of Mary", a reference to the Blessed Virgin Mary.

It is the historic nucleus around which the original settlement of Montreal grew. The settlement became a centre for the fur trade and French expansion into North America until the Treaty of Paris in 1763, which ended the French and Indian War and ceded the territory of New France to Britain. Given its importance, the site of the fort was designated a National Historic Site of Canada in 1924.

The fort and colony gave its name to the borough of Ville-Marie, the old city and downtown core of the modern city of Montreal.

== Place Royale ==
Extensive archaeological work in Montreal has revealed the 1,000-year history of human habitation in the area. In his second expedition to North America in 1535, Jacques Cartier observed the indigenous village of Hochelaga in the vicinity of modern-day Montreal. Cartier's description suggests that the village of Hochelaga was linked to the occupation of the area by the St. Lawrence Iroquoians, a group of Indigenous sedentary farmers who inhabited the St. Lawrence Valley between 1200 and 1600 CE.

By Samuel de Champlain's arrival and in 1608, he found no trace of the St. Lawrence Iroquoians and settlements visited by Cartier some 75 years earlier. Historians and other scholars have developed several theories about their disappearance: devastating wars with the Iroquois tribes to the south, the impact of epidemics of Old World diseases, or their migration westward toward the shores of the Great Lakes. Harold Innis surmised that the northern hunting Indians around Tadoussac traded furs for European weapons and used these to push the farming Indians south.

By the time Champlain arrived, the Algonquins and Mohawks were both using the Saint-Lawrence Valley for hunting grounds, as well as a route for war parties and raiding. Neither nation had any permanent settlements upriver above Tadoussac.

Samuel de Champlain built a temporary fort in 1611. He established a fur-trading post where present-day Pointe-à-Callière stands as part of a project to create a French colonial empire. He and his crew spent a few weeks clearing a site that he named Place Royale, dug two gardens and planted seed that grew well, confirming the fertility of the soil. In 1613, Samuel de Champlain returned to Place Royale and Sault-au-Récollet.

In 1641, some fifty French settlers, both men and women – recruited in France by Jérôme Le Royer de la Dauversière, of Anjou, on behalf of the Société de Notre-Dame de Montréal – set sail for New France. They hoped to convert the natives and create a model Catholic community. After a long crossing and a number of stops, the small group, led by Paul de Chomedey de Maisonneuve, of Champagne, arrived in Quebec with approximately 40 men, three arriving with their wives; Jean Gorry with Isabeau Panie, Antoine Damien with Marie Joly, and Nicolas Godé with Francoise Gadois and their four children; Francois (age 21), Francoise (age 15), Nicolas (age 13), and Mathurine (age 5). The Godés are often referred to as the "First Family of Montreal". There was also an unmarried woman, Catherine Lezeau. Winter was spent on the land of Pierre de Puiseaux near Sillery.

== Ville-Marie ==
Between 1642 and 1676, this was the location of annual fur-trading meets, as Amerindians brought their pelts to trade for various goods with the French. When the settlement was being laid out by the Sulpicians in the late 1600s, they reserved a small plot of land along the river's shore for use as a public market, and it was known as the Place du Marché.

In May 1642, the group left Quebec to go to the Island of Montreal in spite of the efforts by the Montmagny governor to have them settle on the Island of Orleans. They arrived on May 17. Mrs. De la Peltrine, her lady-in-waiting Charlotte Barre, as well as Jeanne Mance, were part of this trip. Francois Godé remained in Quebec and did not make the inaugural journey to Montreal.

The new arrivals set to work to build the Ville-Marie fort on the spot where Champlain had once stayed. The fort housed as many as 50 early colonists. The first governor was Paul Chomedey de Maisonneuve.

The French and the Dutch (of Fort Orange and New Amsterdam) were primarily interested in fur trading. The Iroquois had allied with the Dutch of Fort Orange and New Amsterdam, who supplied arms to them. In 1641 the war with the Iroquois began. By 1643, Ville-Marie had already been hit by Iroquois raids. In 1649, the situation was so critical that Maisonneuve went back to France to get help. In 1653, to confront this Iroquois danger, a group of 100 settler-soldiers came to stay in Ville-Marie. With them were 15 King's Daughters placed under the care of Marguerite Bourgeoys. Jeanne Mance would set up the Hôtel-Dieu de Montréal hospital in Montreal. In the first years, the Hôtel-Dieu was hosted inside the fort.

By 1685, Ville-Marie had a population of some 600 colonists, most of them living in modest wooden houses. The parish church and the seminary of the Sulpician fathers, seigneurs of the Island, dominated the little town. Most business was transacted in the Marketplace, located just next to the mouth of the little river. Here Montrealers and Amerindians would meet to trade.

The fort, in use between 1642 and 1674, was demolished in 1688 and the entire settlement was walled and bastioned during the Indian war. The Louis-Hector de Callière residence was built on this place in 1695. In 1705, the settlement was officially renamed Montreal.

In 2007, an archaeological dig uncovered the remains of Ville-Marie under a maritime warehouse in Montreal. In 2015, an archaeological dig uncovered one of the corner posts of the fort.

== Gallery ==
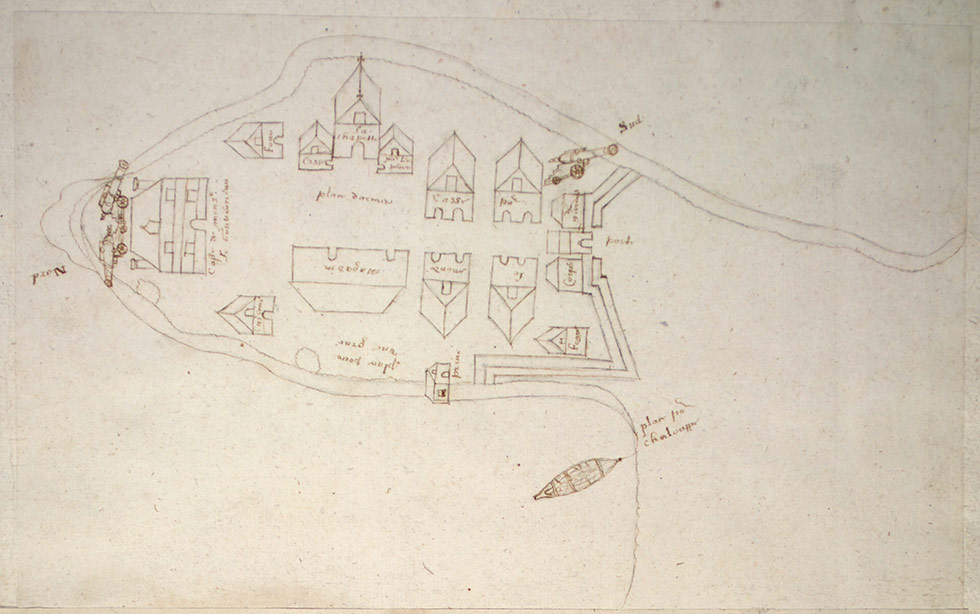
Ville-Marie in 1647

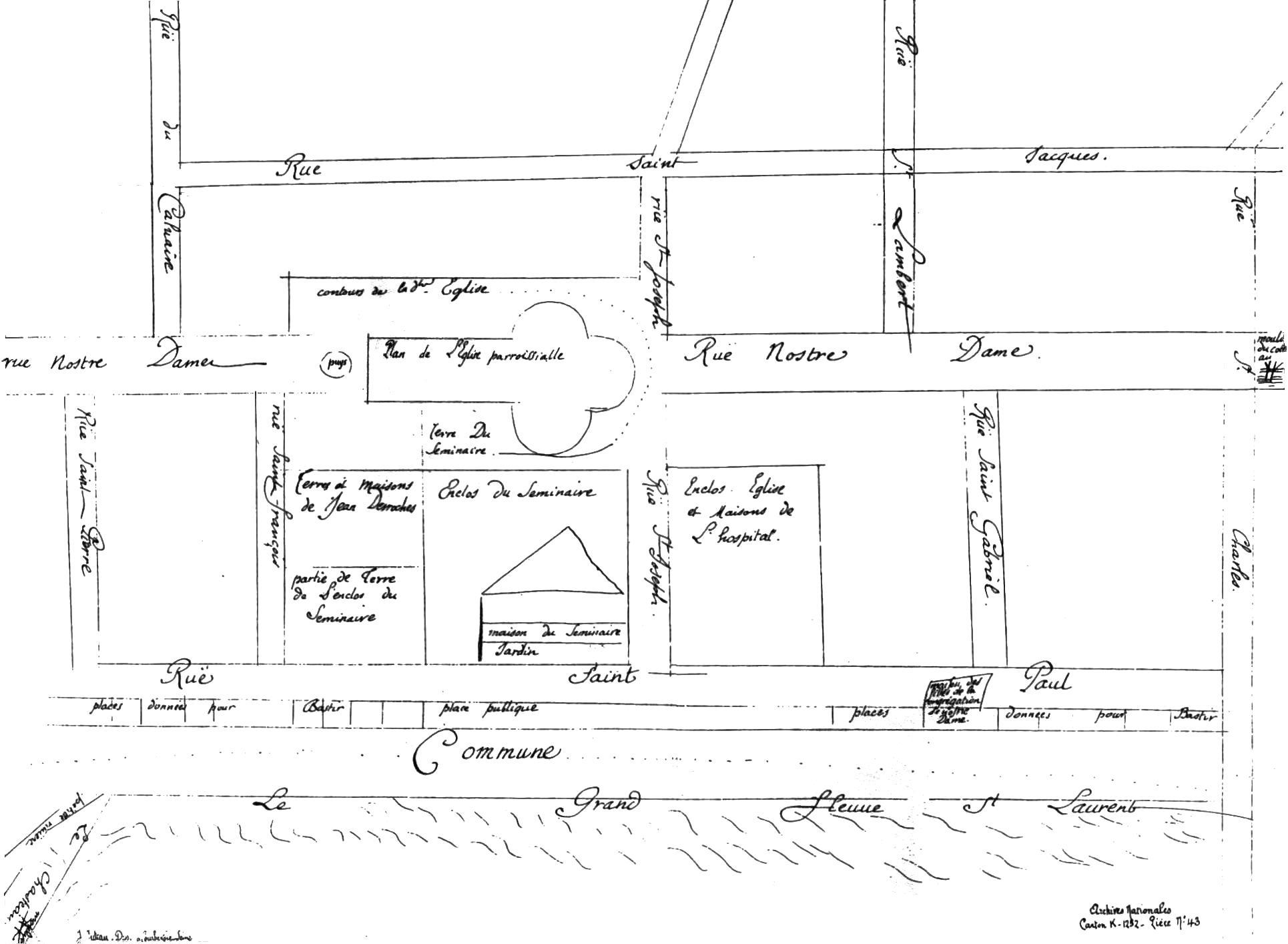
Ville-Marie in 1672

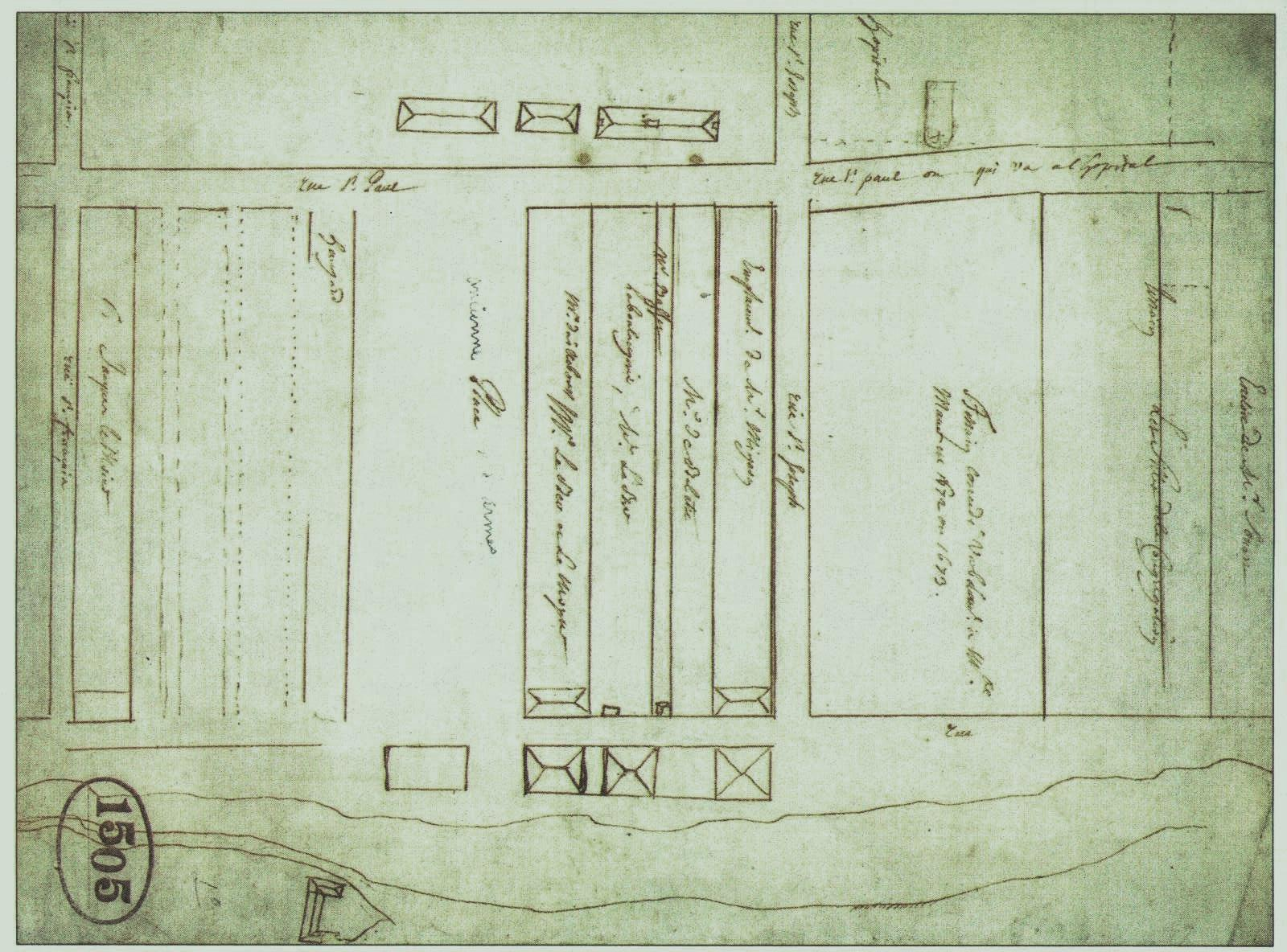
Ville-Marie in 1675

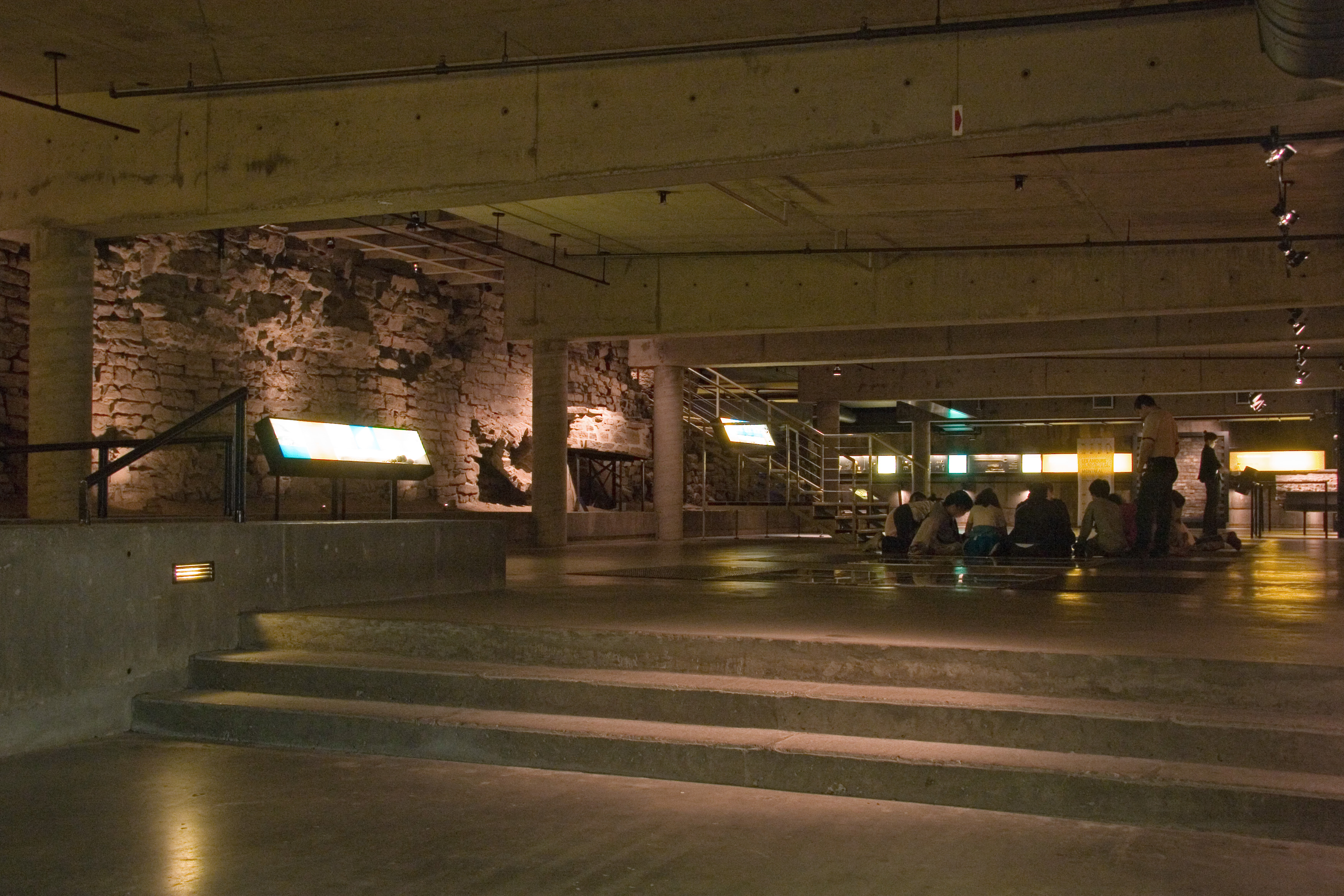
Pointe-à-Callière archaeological site

== See also ==
- The Citadel, Montreal
- History of Montreal
