= New York Life Insurance Building (Montreal) =

Coordinates: 45.5050°N 73.5579°W

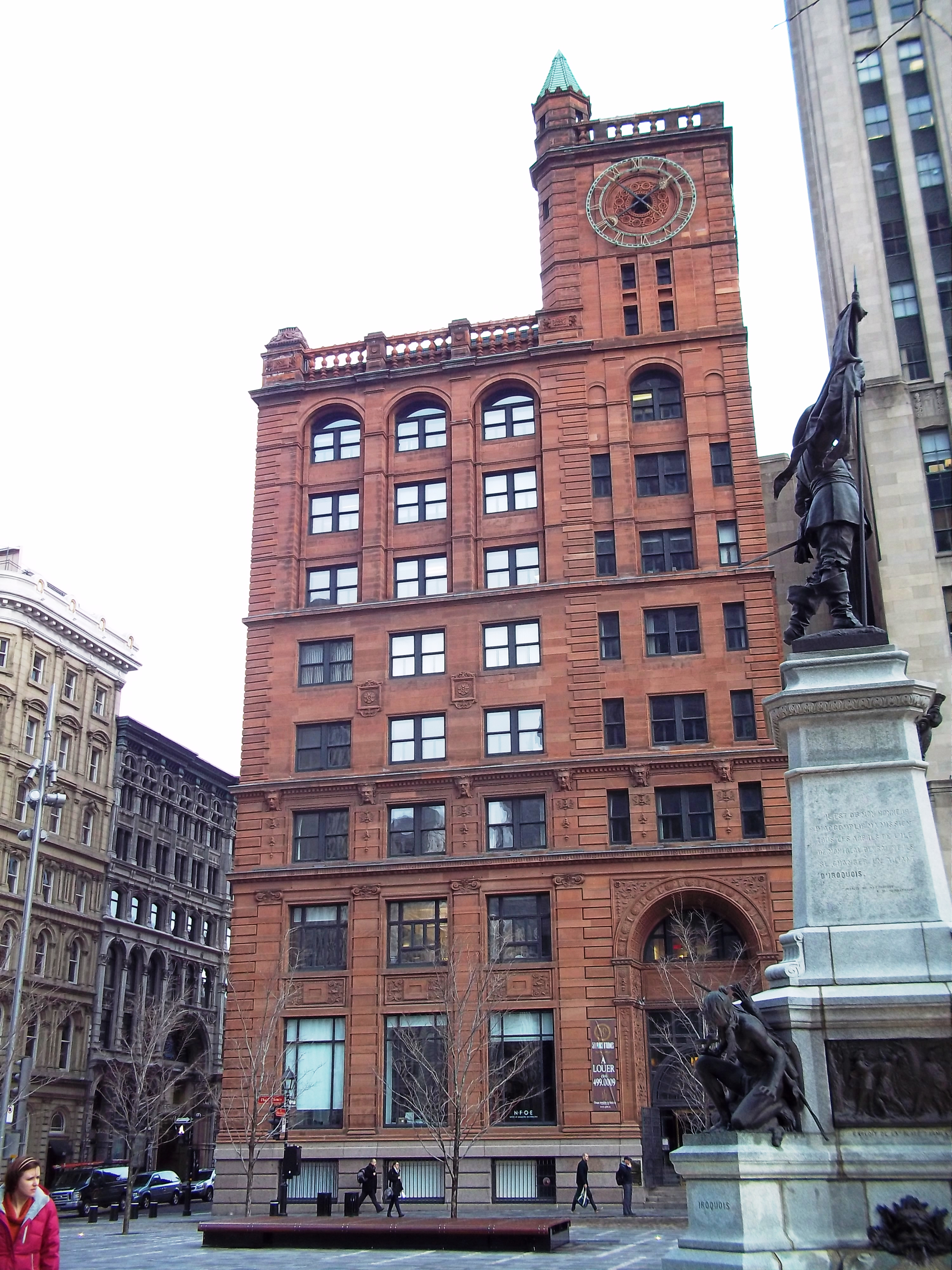
- Interactive map of the New York Life Insurance Building area

General information
- Type: Office building
- Architectural style: Richardsonian Romanesque
- Location: 511 Place D'Armes; Montreal, Quebec, Canada
- Completed: 1889

Technical details
- Floor count: 8 (equivalent to 10 with tower)

Design and construction
- Architects: Babb, Cook and Willard, New York (and Peter Lyall)

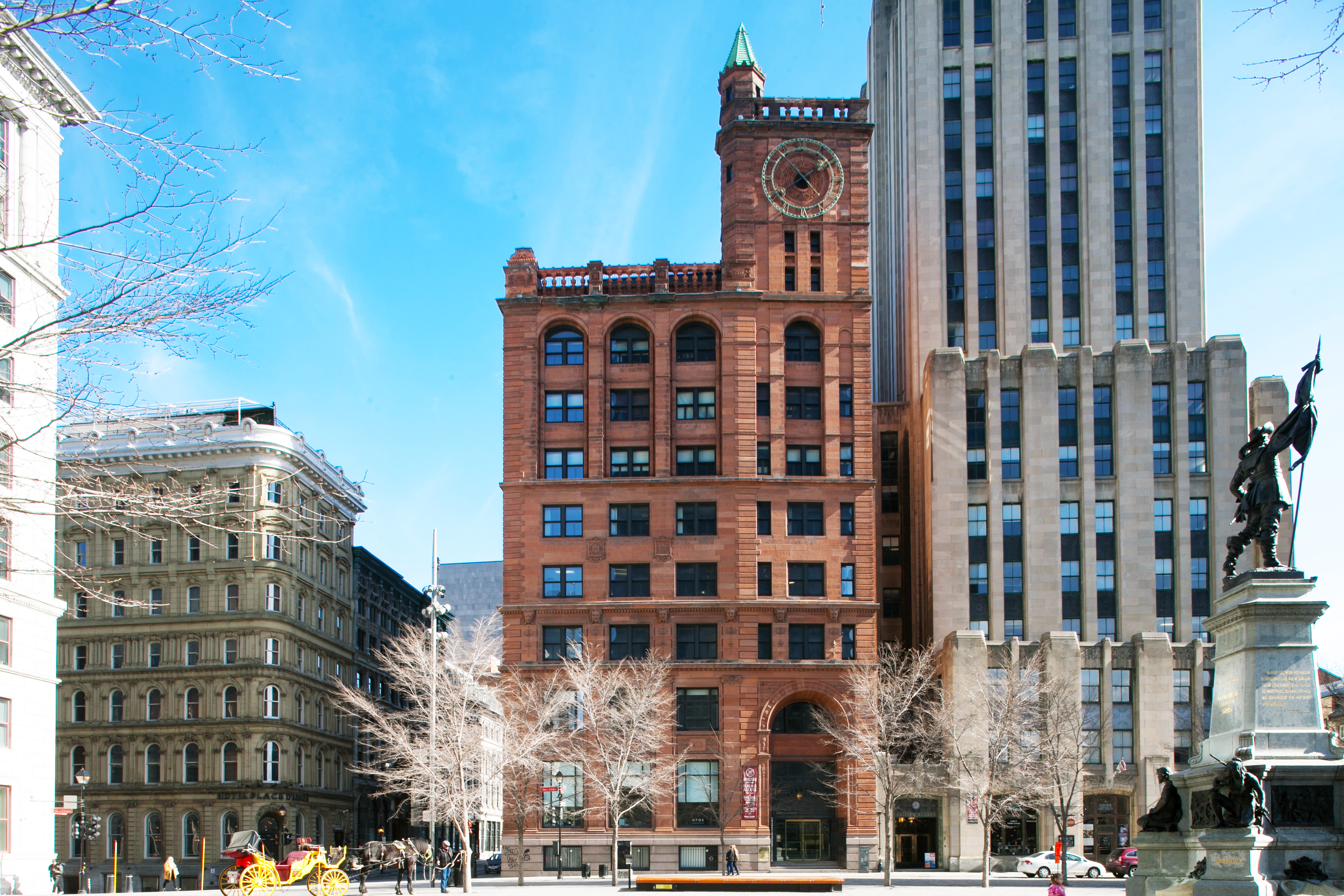
511 Place d'Armes

The New York Life Insurance Building (French: Édifice New York Life Insurance; also known as the Quebec Bank Building, French: Édifice Quebec Bank) is an office building at Place d'Armes in what is now known as Old Montreal, Quebec, Canada. It was erected in 1887–1889 and, at the time of its completion, was the tallest commercial building in Montreal. The first eight floors were designed for retail office space, which quickly filled with the city's best lawyers and financiers. When the clock tower was completed, the owner filled the ninth and tenth floors with the largest legal library in the entire country as a gift to tenants. The building is next to another historic office tower, Aldred Building.

== History ==
New York Life Insurance Building around the turn of the twentieth century

The New York Life Insurance Building was built by architects Babb, Cook and Willard and contractor Peter Lyall for the New York Life Insurance Company as its office in Canada. The final cost was $750,000. The Old Red Sandstone used in the construction was imported from Dumfriesshire, Scotland.

New York Life selected the site on Place d’Armes because it was near the Montreal business hub. Before construction began, crews demolished l’Hotel Compain and another 2 story building that occupied the lots. The building first appeared on 1890 insurance map.

Quebec Bank purchased the building in 1909 and occupied the ground floor before being absorbed into the Royal Bank of Canada in 1917. The structure still bears the bank's name carved over the entrance.

The building is near Place-d'Armes Metro, and is adjacent to other prominent Montreal landmarks, such as the Aldred Building (1931), the Bank of Montreal Building (1859/1901), the Place d'Armes Hotel, Notre-Dame Basilica and 500 Place D'Armes.

== Architecture ==
View of the building from across Place d'Armes, taken in the mid-1970s

The New York Life Building was inspired by Italian Renaissance and buildings in New York and was one of the first major Montreal buildings which did not use the local grey stone but instead used imported red sandstone. The stone required cutting which was done in Lyall workshop located on Bishop Street. The building has a “hybrid structure combining a frame – iron beams, girders and two sets of columns per floor – and bearing walls brick.” Architects used steel to construct the floors and the roof but employed masonry walls to support the structure. Henry Beaumont carved the significant external decorative elements such as the arabesque in the entrance archway, spandrel panels and pilaster capitals. The ornamental iron gate is by the E. Chanteloup workshop in Montreal.

The building contains eight floors and has a height of 46.3 metres (152 ft) including the clock tower. It has a quasi-rectangular shape and has a land area of 705 m^{2} (7,590 sq ft) Total floor area including all floors is 6,890 m^{2} (74,200 sq ft). Interior walls in the small vestibule and the halls are covered in marble and the ceiling has a decorative plaster resembling Renaissance ornamentation. The staircase railing consists of ornamental iron with a finished wood banister.

The office building is located on a corner lot and has façades on Place d’Armes and Rue Saint-Jacques. The original address was 13 Place d’Armes Hills but was later changed to its current address, 511 Place d’Armes.

Owners modernized the third, fourth and fifth floors in 1952, and renovated the basement in 1970. In 1971, they added stairs between the fifth floor and the roof. Subsequent owners completed further renovations in the 1980s and undertook an additional restoration project in 2006–2007 which included adding two residential penthouses on the roof. One of these is occupied by the current building owner.

== Owners ==
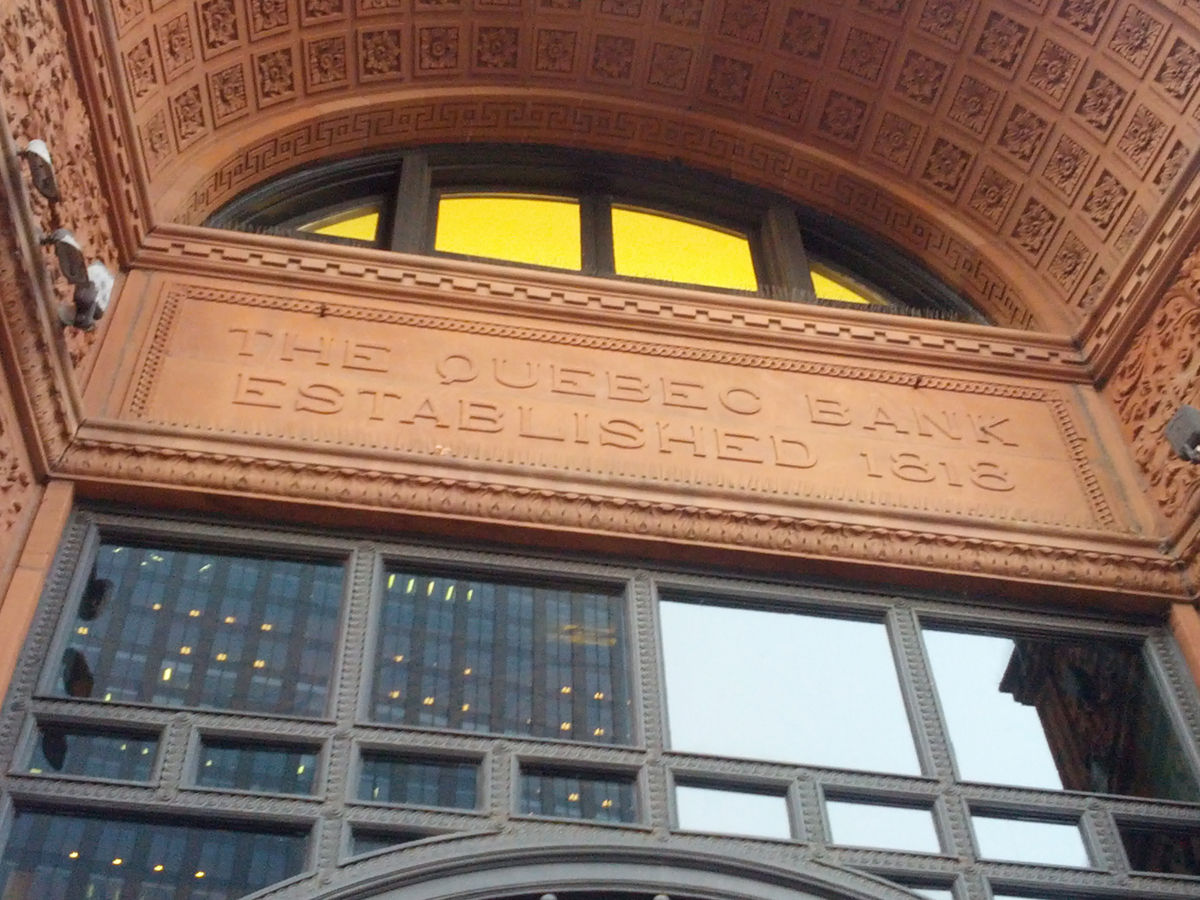
Name carved on the entrance. Note the reversed "Q" in "Quebec".

The building’s original name was New York Life Building but in 1909 became home of Quebec Bank. The building was also known as Bank of Quebec building and Montreal Trust building but still is referred to by its original name. The building has changed hands many times and had a number of notable tenants, including the Montreal Real Trust Company, London and Lancashire Insurance Co., the National Bank of Canada and the Société de Fiducie du Quebec. The Société de Fiducie du Quebec occupied the building for six years and sold it to Les immeubles Bona Ltée who performed many upgrades to the building. Akelius Montreal Ltd. acquired the property on January 31, 2020, and are the current owners.
