= Maisonneuve Monument =

Historical monument in Place d'Armes, Montreal, Canada

Coordinates: 45°30′17″N 73°33′26″W

- Monument à Paul de Chomedey, sieur de Maisonneuve
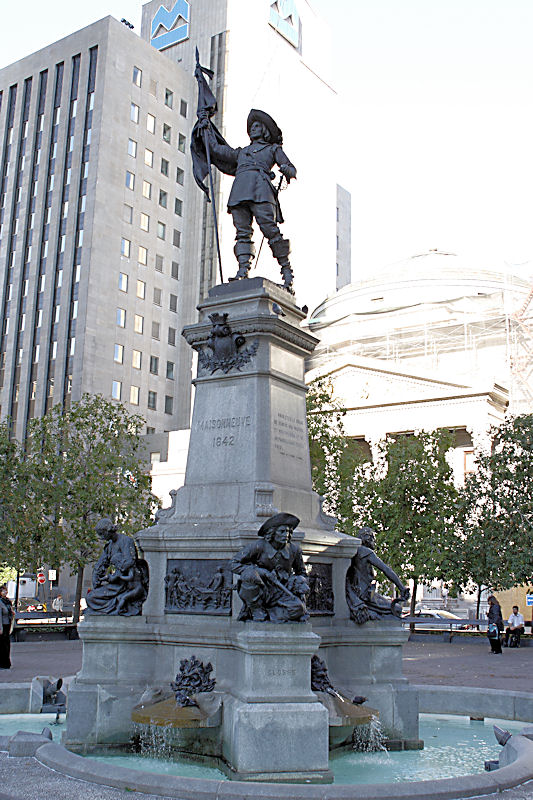
- Interactive map of Maisonneuve Monument
- Location: Place d'Armes in Old Montreal
- Designer: Louis-Philippe Hébert
- Material: bronze, concrete
- Opening date: July 1, 1895
- Dedicated to: Paul Chomedey de Maisonneuve

The Maisonneuve Monument (French: Monument à Paul de Chomedey, sieur de Maisonneuve) is a monument by sculptor Louis-Philippe Hébert built in 1895 in Place d'Armes in Montreal.

== History ==
This monument in memory of Paul Chomedey de Maisonneuve, founder of Montreal, was unveiled on July 1, 1895, as part of the celebrations for the 250th anniversary of the founding of the city in 1642. In 1896, the imposing monument in the centre of Place d'Armes attracted many curious onlookers.

During the 1890s, a series of commemorative plaques was produced for the first time in Montreal, at the instigation of the Antiquarian and Numismatic Society, which took an active role in the project to build the Maisonneuve Monument. For its part, the Société historique de Montréal in 1892-93 had an obelisk erected in memory of the founders of Montreal. The Francophones and Anglophones of Montreal found common ground in the commemoration of the personalities of New France, with each cultural group highlighting its own heroes.

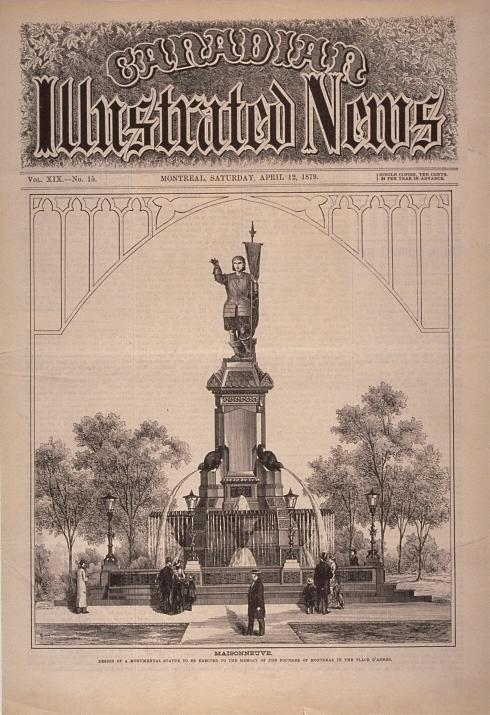
Canadian Illustrated News (April 12, 1879), Projet Monument Maisonneuve by Louis-Philippe Hébert

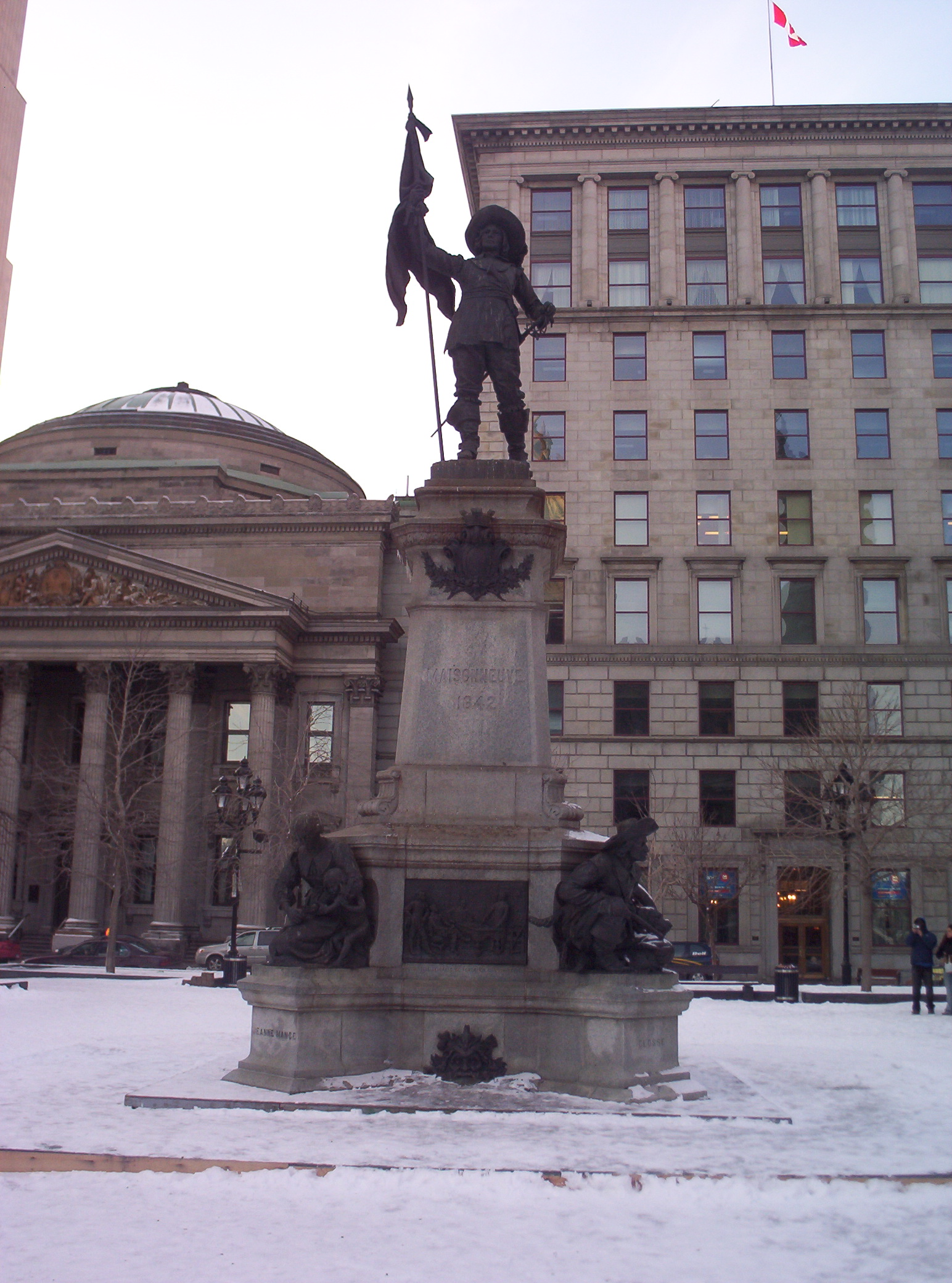
Place d'Armes monument by Louis-Philippe Hébert

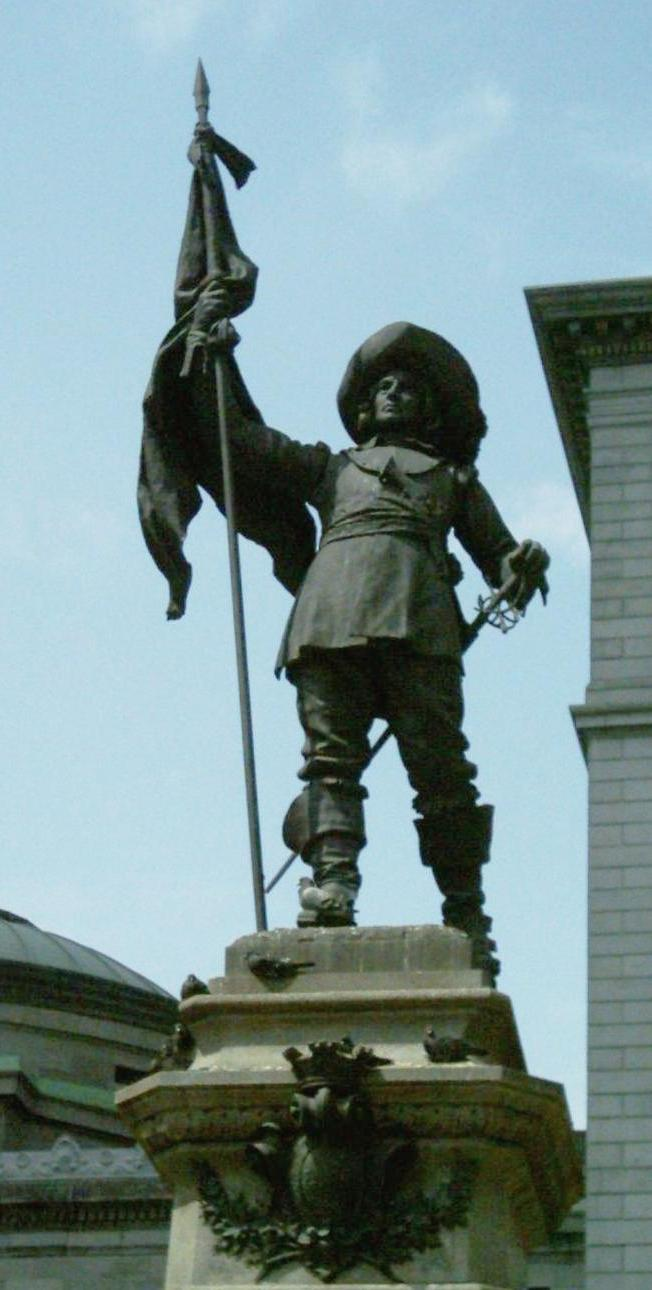
Paul Chomedey de Maisonneuve by Louis-Philippe Hébert

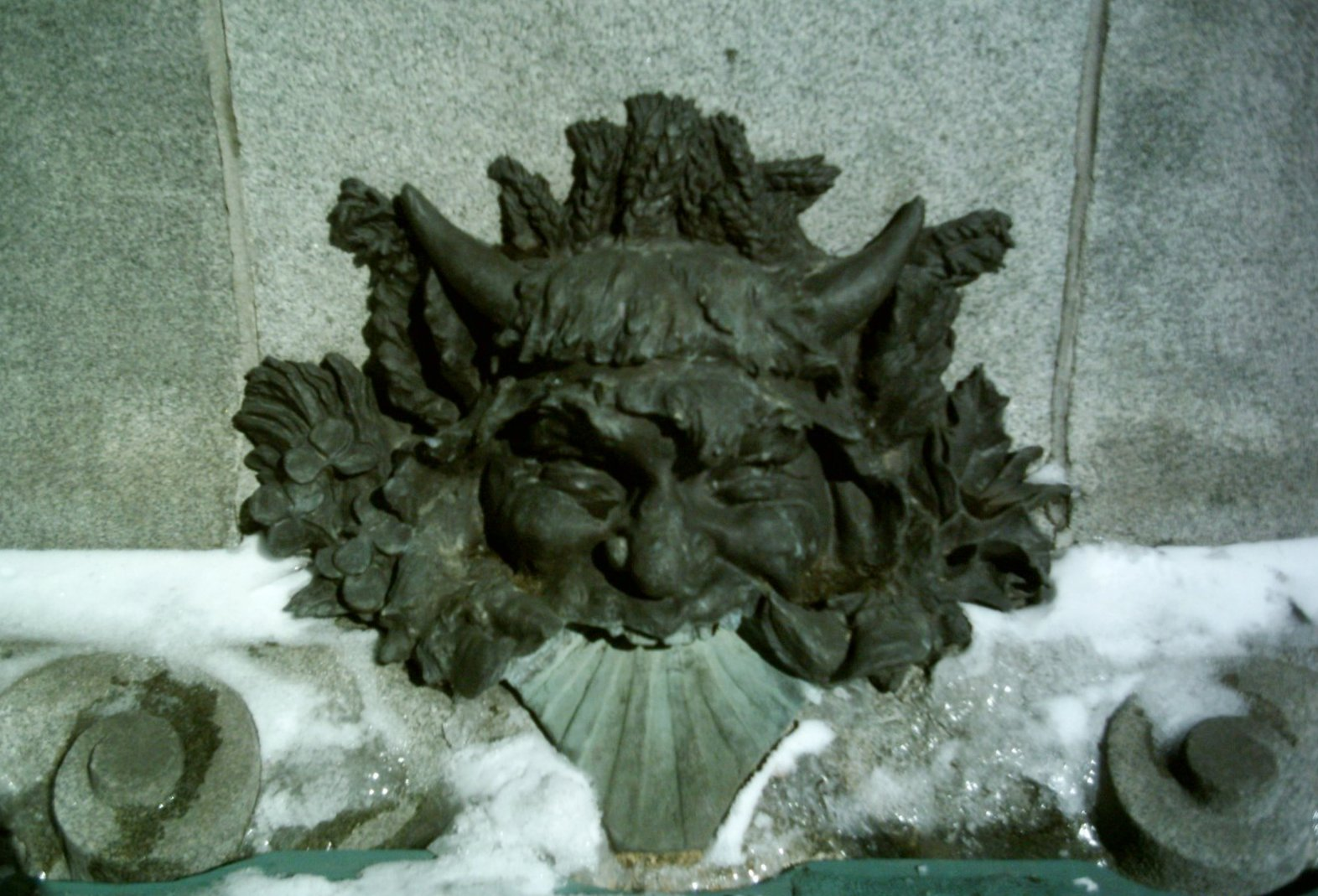
One of the four mascarons by Louis-Philippe Hébert

== Statue Base ==
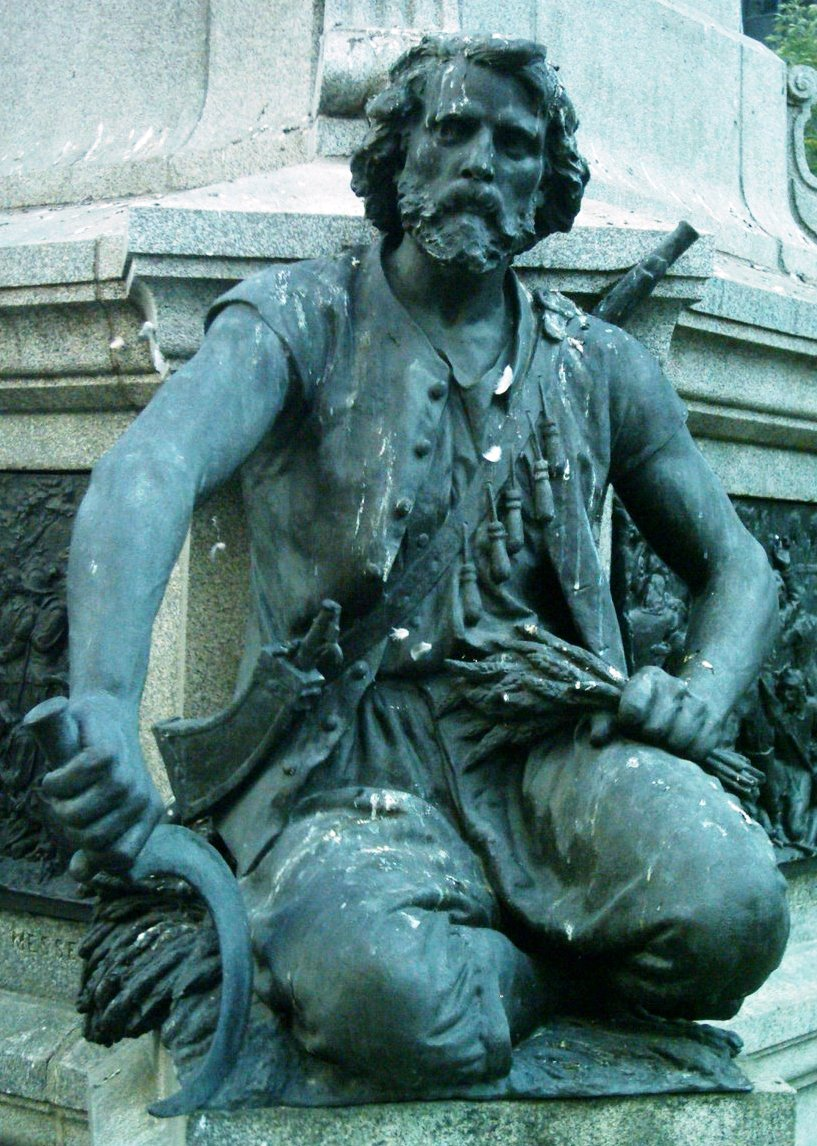
Charles Le Moyne

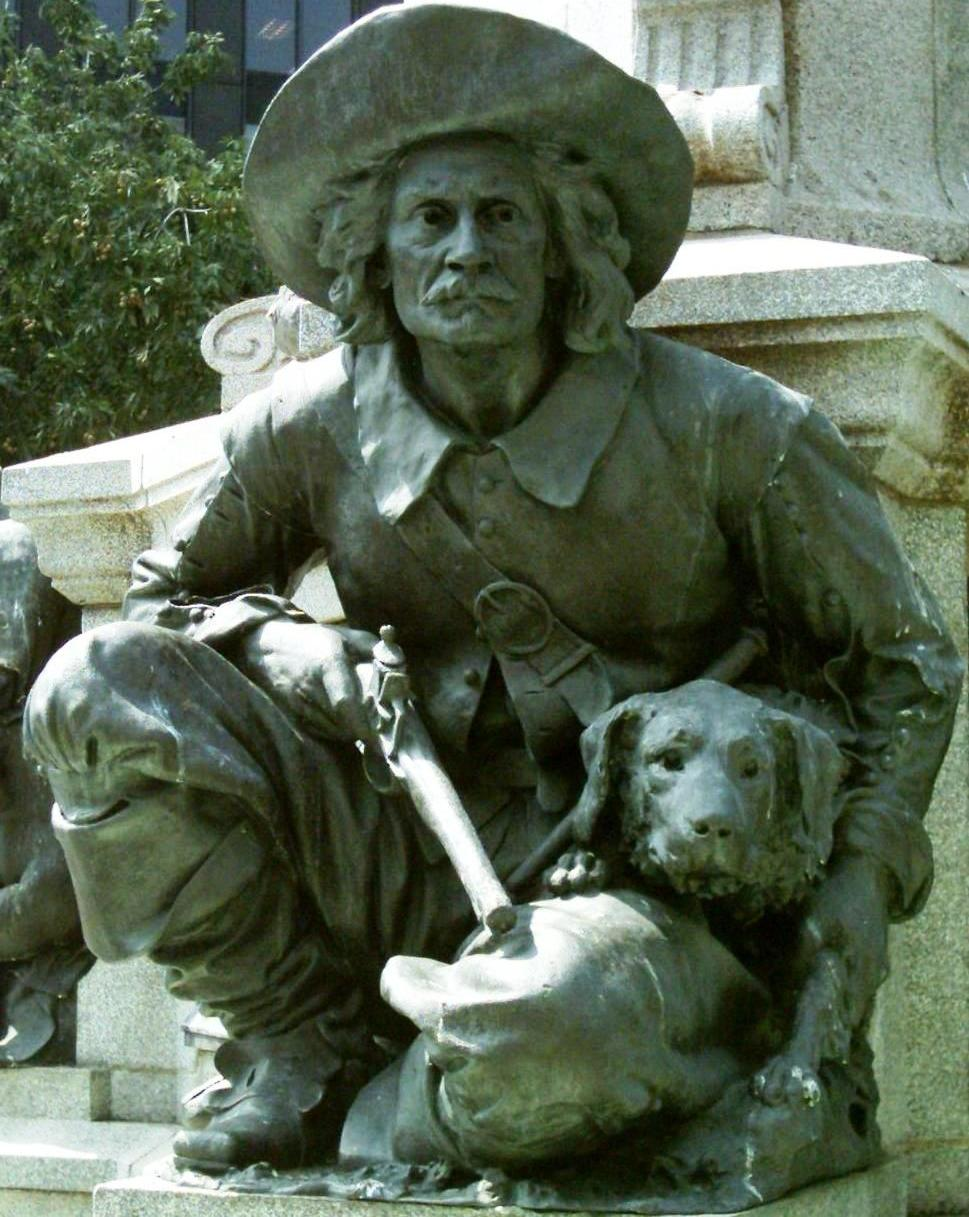
Lambert Closse

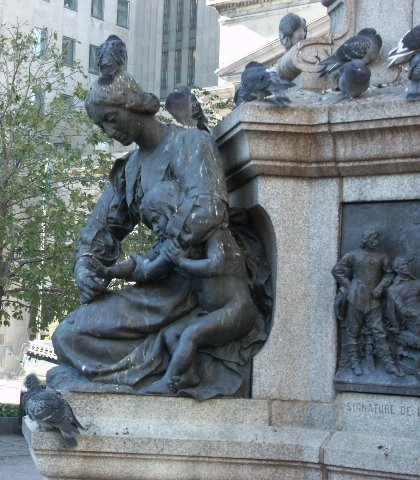
Jeanne Mance

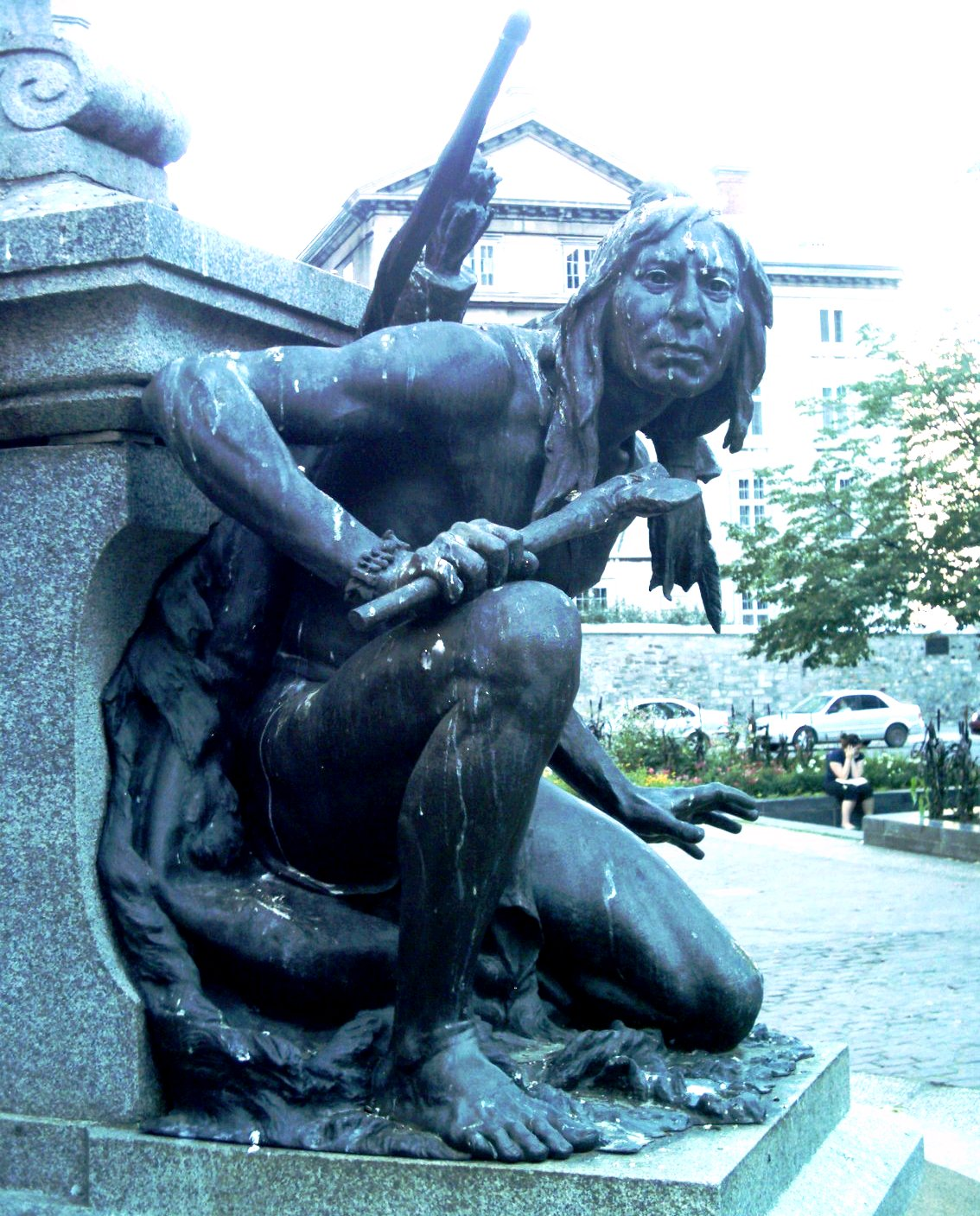
Iroquois

=== Bas-reliefs ===
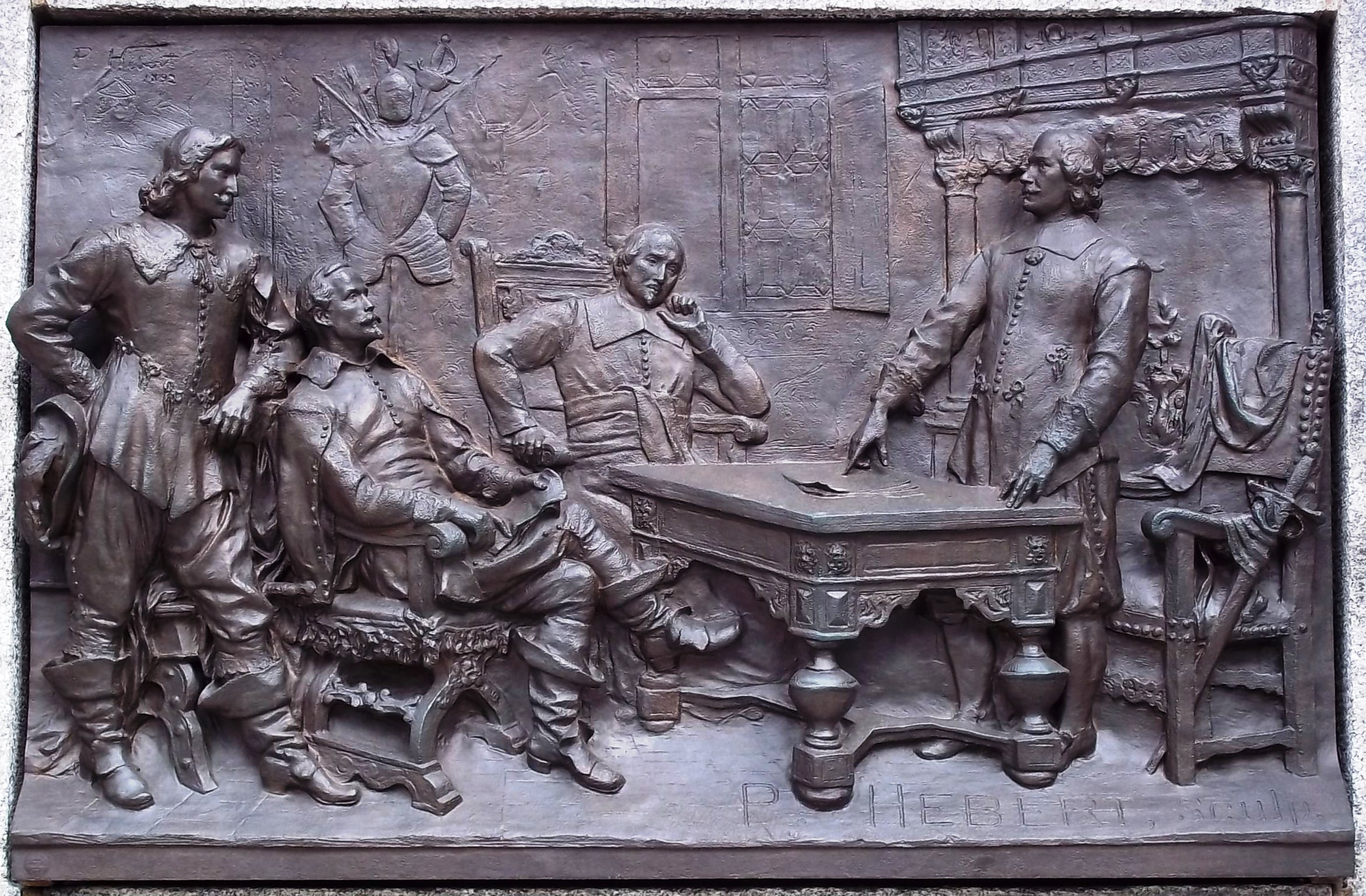
Gaston de Rentry, Pierre Chevrier, baron de Fancamp, Jean-Jacques Olier, and Jérôme le Royer de la Dauversière

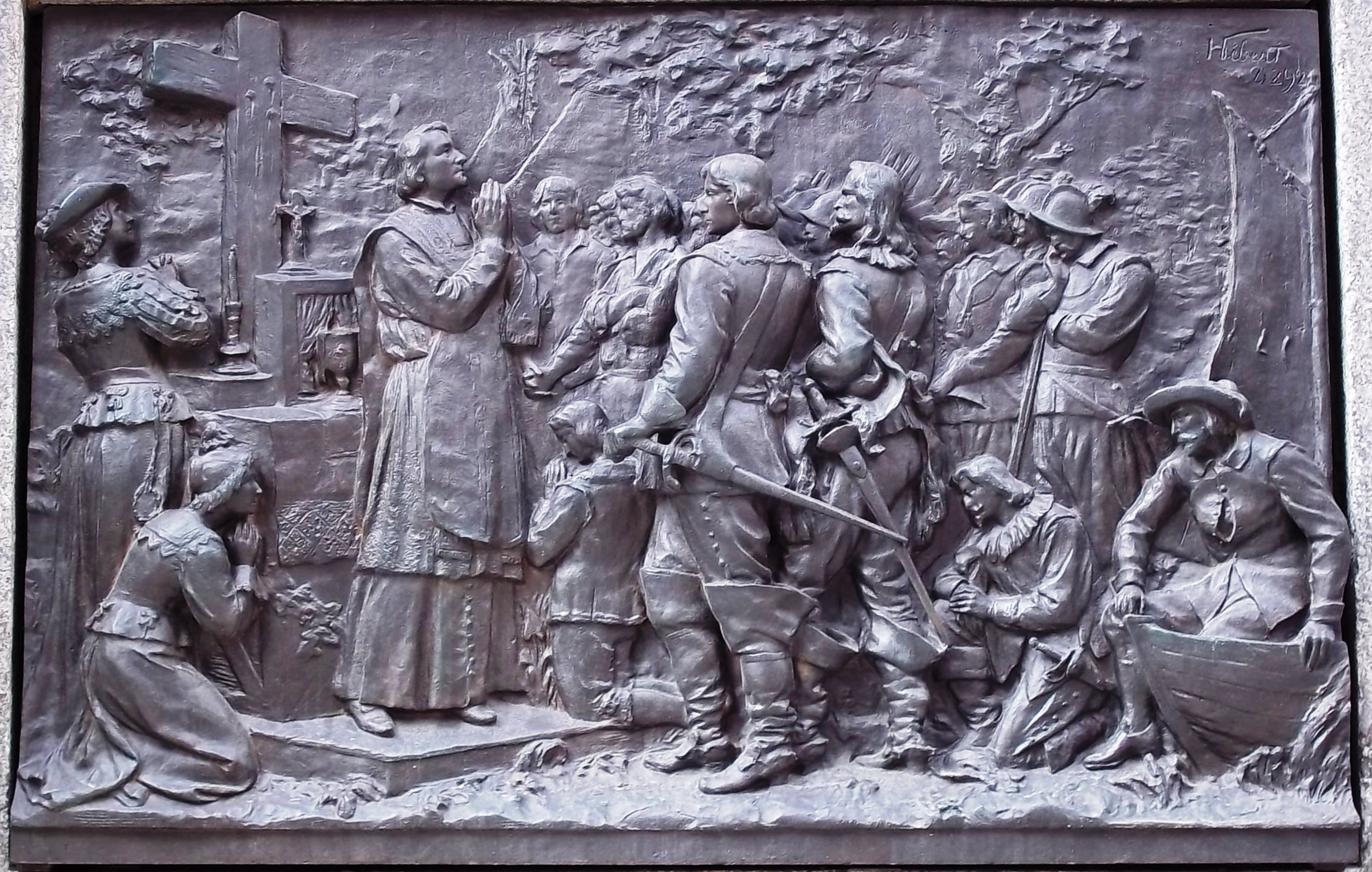
Barthélemy Vimont conducts the first mass in Ville Marie on May 18, 1642

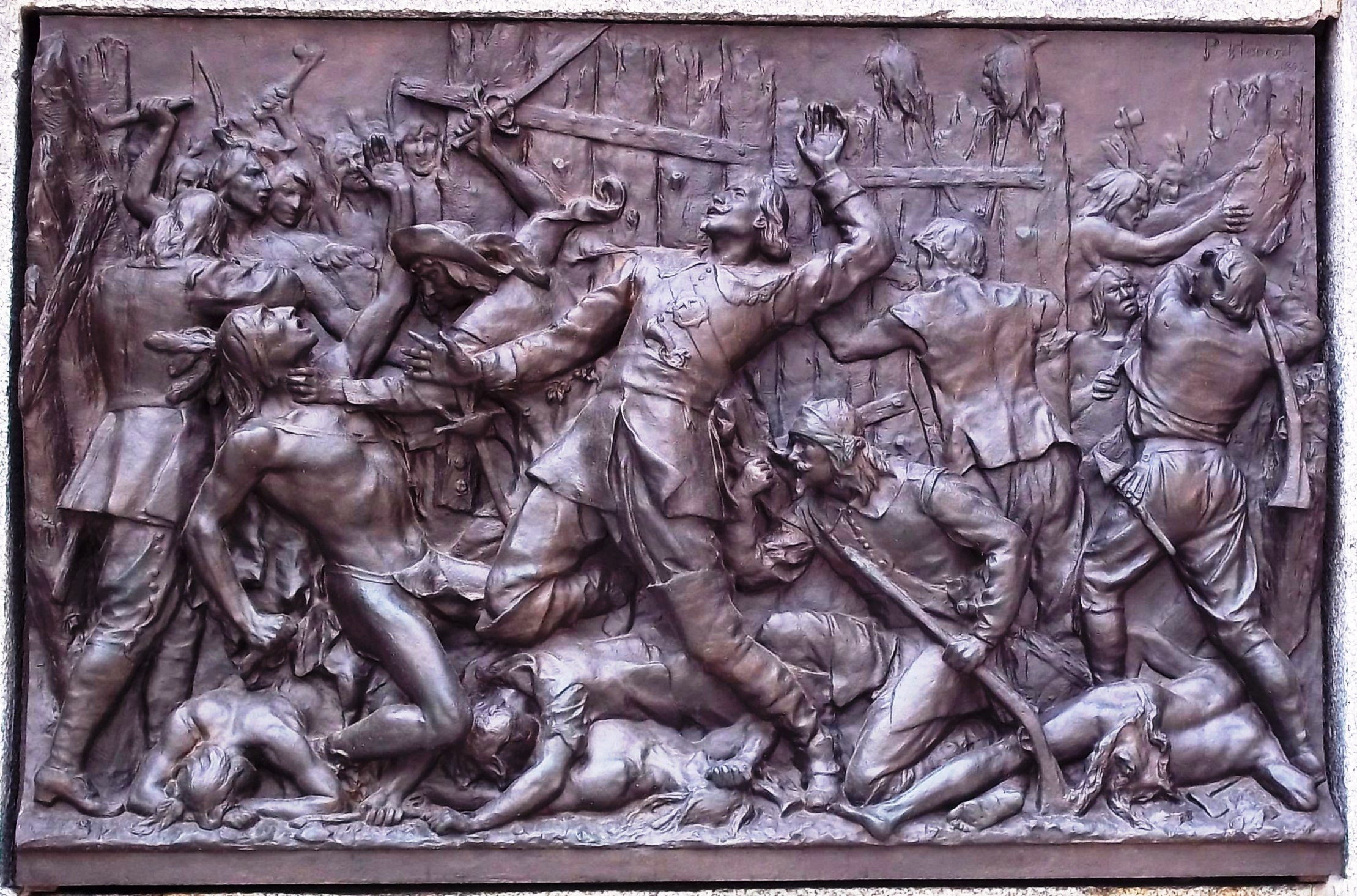
Adam Dollard des Ormeaux in the Battle of Long Sault

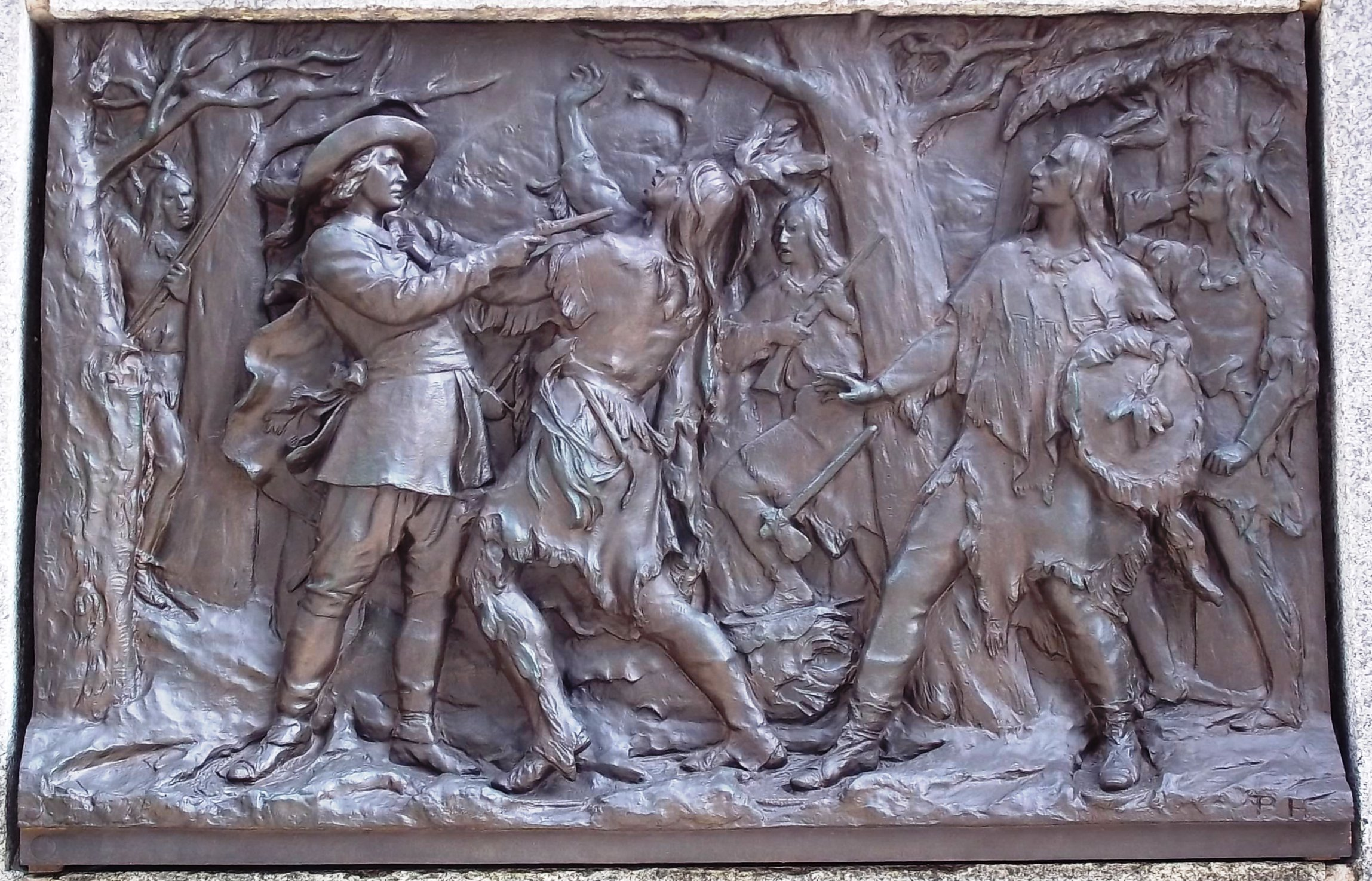
Place d'Armes
