= 500 Place D'Armes =

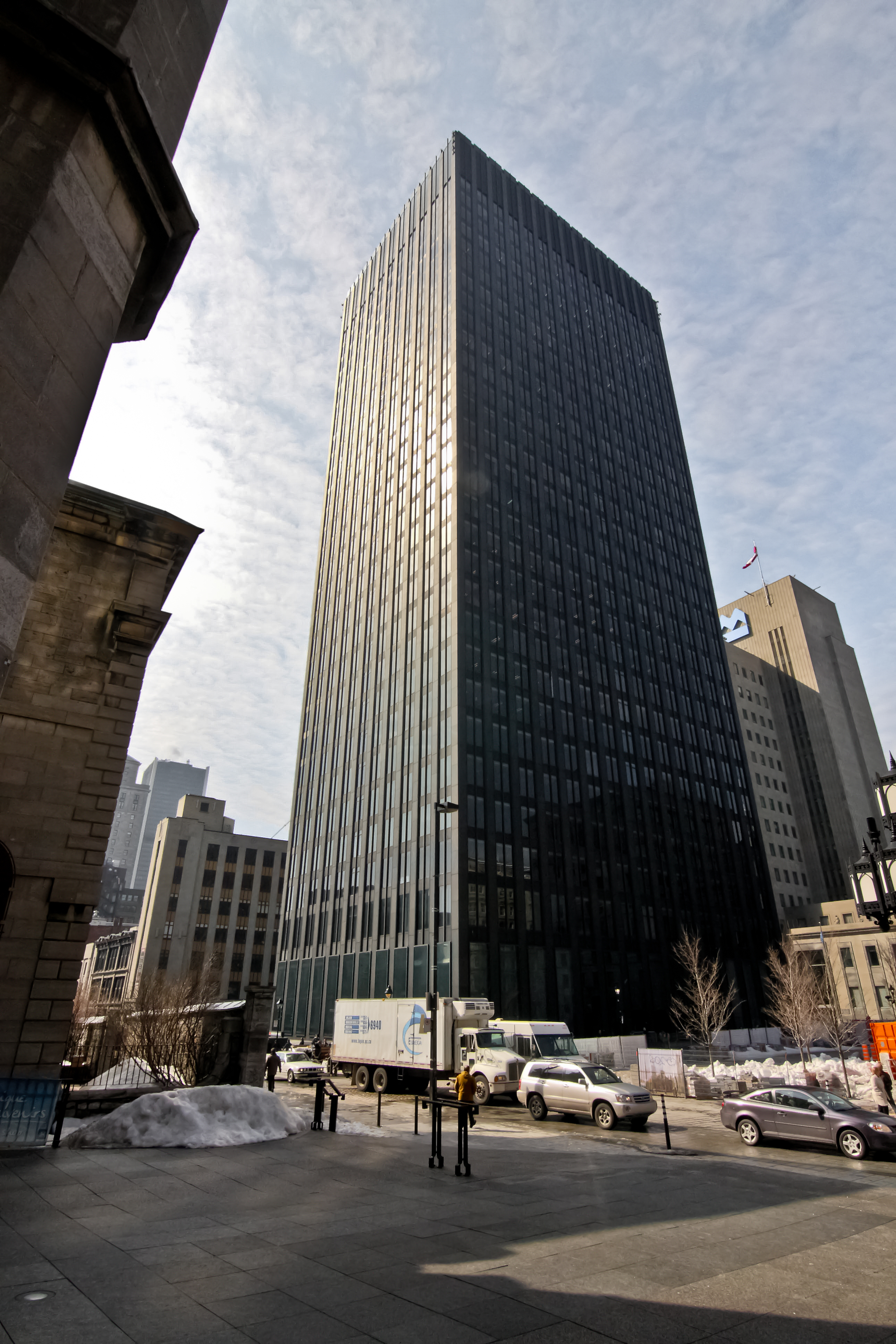
- Interactive map of the 500 Place D'Armes area

General information
- Status: Completed
- Type: Office
- Architectural style: International style
- Location: 500 Place d'Armes, Montreal, Quebec, Canada
- Coordinates: 45.50428°N 73.5574745°W
- Construction started: 1965
- Completed: 1968

Height
- Roof: 132.67 metres (435.3 ft)

Technical details
- Floor count: 32

Design and construction
- Architecture firm: David Barott & Boulva

Website
- cromwellmgt.ca/en/commercial/project/500-place-darmes/building/500

500 Place d'Armes is an International style building on the historic Place d'Armes square in Old Montreal quarter of Montreal, Quebec, Canada. Completed in 1968 as the Banque Canadienne Nationale tower, it is Montreal's 17th tallest building, at 133 m (435 ft), 32 storeys. It was designed by Montreal architects Pierre Boulva and Jacques David, whose other prominent Montreal projects included the Palais de justice de Montréal, Théâtre Maisonneuve, the Dow Planetarium and the Place-des-Arts, Atwater and Lucien-L'Allier metro stations.

When it was built in the late 1960s, this building was the subject of heated talk. According to one source the building disfigured its part of Old Montreal, overshadowing all of the architecture of Old Montreal surrounding it.

== See also ==
- List of tallest buildings in Montreal
