= Neuville-sur-Vanne =

Commune in Grand Est, France

- Commune
- Town hall

- Coat of arms
- Location of Neuville-sur-Vanne
- Location within France Location within Grand Est
- Coordinates: 48°15′22″N 3°46′53″E
- Country: France
- Region: Grand Est
- Department: Aube
- Arrondissement: Troyes
- Canton: Aix-Villemaur-Pâlis

Government
  - Mayor (2020–2026): Etienne Ghisalberti
- Area^{1}: 17.25 km^{2} (6.66 sq mi)
- Elevation: 135 m (443 ft)
- Population (2023): 475
  - Density: 27.5/km^{2} (71.3/sq mi)
- Time zone: UTC+01:00 (CET)
  - Summer (DST): UTC+02:00 (CEST)
- INSEE/Postal code: 10263 /10190
- ^{1} French Land Register data, which excludes lakes, ponds, glaciers > 1 km^{2} (0.386 sq mi or 247 acres) and river estuaries.

Neuville-sur-Vanne (French pronunciation: [nøvil syʁ van], literally Neuville on Vanne, before 2008: Neuville-sur-Vannes) is a commune in the Aube department in north-central France.

== Population ==
Historical population
Year	Pop.	±% p.a.
1968	393	—
1975	312	−3.24%
1982	340	+1.24%
1990	327	−0.49%
1999	340	+0.43%
2007	438	+3.22%
2012	425	−0.60%
2017	423	−0.09%
2023	475	+1.95%
Source: INSEE

== Notable people ==
- Paul de Chomedey, Sieur de Maisonneuve

== See also ==
- Communes of the Aube department
