= Paul de Chomedey, Sieur de Maisonneuve =

French military officer and founder of present-day Montreal, Canada

Paul de Chomedey, sieur de Maisonneuve
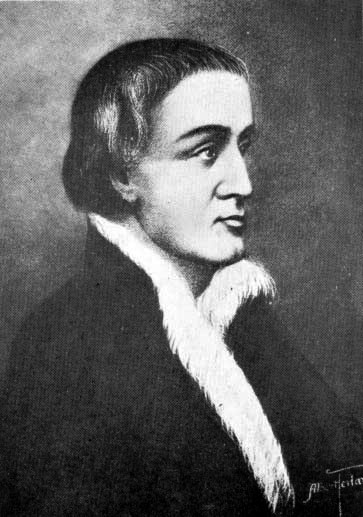
- Maisonneuve's Portrait by Benjamin Sulte
- Born: February 13, 1612; Neuville-sur-Vannes (Champagne, France)
- Died: September 9, 1676 (aged 64) Paris, France
- Allegiance: France
- Other work: the founder of Ville-Marie (a religious mission, in what is now Montreal, Canada) military officer

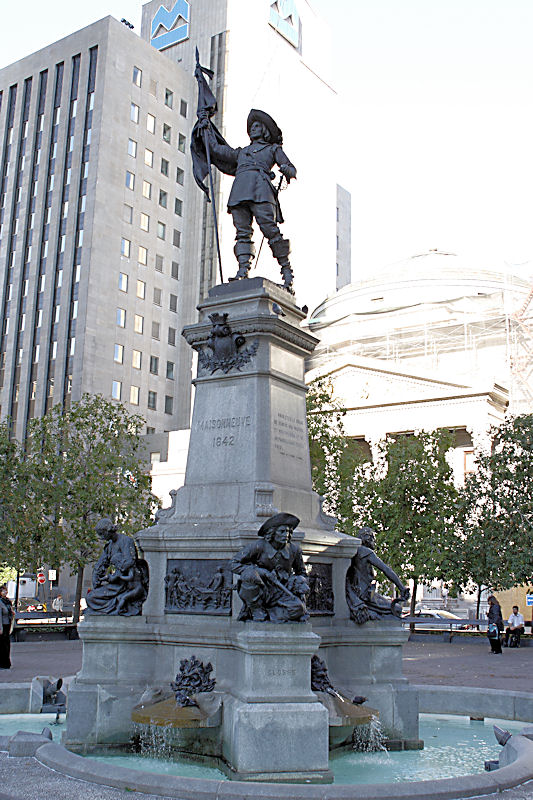
Maisonneuve Monument at Place d'Armes

Paul de Chomedey de Maisonneuve (13 February 1612 – 9 September 1676) was a French military officer and the founder of Ville-Marie, now the city of Montreal.

== Early life ==
Maisonneuve was baptised on 15 February 1612 at Neuville-sur-Vannes in Champagne, France. He was the son of Louis de Chomedey, seigneur of Chavane, Germenoy-en-Brie, and his second wife Marie de Thomelin, the daughter of Jean de Thomelin, a king's counsellor and a treasurer of France in the generality of Champagne, and of Ambroise d’Aulquoy.

Paul de Chomedey grew up in the manor-house at Neuville-sur-Vanne, not far from the Maisonneuve seigneury which his father had acquired in 1614. He had two sisters and one brother. He began his military career at 13 in Holland, where he also learned to play the lute.

Just before his 30th birthday, Maisonneuve was recruited by Jérome le Royer de la Dauversiere, who was head of the Société Notre-Dame de Montréal. The latter claimed to have experienced a vision that inspired him to sponsor a mission on Montreal Island in New France. Maisonneuve was hired to lead the colonists and ensure their safety in the new land.

== Governor of Montreal ==
In 1642, Ville-Marie was founded on the southern shore of the Island of Montreal, where a chapel and a small settlement were built. A hospital, under the leadership of Jeanne Mance, was also established. Maisonneuve was the first governor of Montreal.

The settlers maintained peaceful relations with the Algonquin people, one of the indigenous tribes of the area. The first year of the colony's existence was peaceful. In 1643 a flood threatened the city. Maisonneuve prayed to the Virgin Mary to stop the inundation and when it abated, he erected a cross atop Mount Royal. A cross has been maintained there to the current day.

Of the local First Nations tribes with whom these French settlers had contact with, the Mohawk, who were already trading with the Dutch and in New Amsterdam (modern New York City), resented French efforts to interrupt the trade. The Mohawk were based in present-day New York State, south of Montreal, and severely threatened the new colony. The Algonquin, in contrast, maintained peaceful relations with the newly arrived Europeans. Nevertheless, they were often at war with the Haudenosaunee (Iroquois), who discovered the existence of the new French settlement of Montreal, whose defence Maisonneuve commanded using his military training, only in 1643.

Already familiar with the terrain, the Haudenosaunee would often observe and engage the French settlers from the safety of the woods. That devastating strategy was the beginning of a long conflict between the groups as they were competing with each other for game and other resources. On 30 March 1644, the situation came to a head. Warned by their guard dogs as to the nearby presence of their enemies, a band of 30 settlers went into the forest to face their foes. Once in the woods, the French encountered 250 Haudenosaunee people in ambush, waiting for them. Retreating in the face of such uneven odds, Maisonneuve remained last so that the others could make it safely back to the fort, resulting in him being set upon by a Haudenosaunee chief. In this decisive moment, Maisonneuve fired twice on the chief, thus "killing him with his bare hands," as is sometimes quoted about the event, before returning to the safety of the fort amid much fanfare.

In 1645, Maisonneuve received news that his father had died, and he returned to France. There, he was offered the position of Governor of New France but turned it down, wanting to continue his leadership of Ville-Marie. Maisonneuve returned to Montreal in 1647, and the wars with the Iroquois continued. In 1649, Maisonneuve stood as godfather for the first white child baptized in the colony. She was Pauline Hébert, the daughter of the fur-trader Augustin Hébert and his wife Adrienne Du Vivier, who had come to Montreal in 1648 with Maisonneuve and their elder daughter Jeanne.

In the spring of 1651, the Haudenosaunee attacks became so frequent and so violent that Ville-Marie thought that its end had come. Maisonneuve made all the settlers take refuge in the fort. By 1652, the colony at Montreal had been so reduced that he was forced to return to France to raise 100 volunteers to go with him to the colony the following year. If the effort had failed, Montreal would have been abandoned and the survivors relocated downriver to Quebec City. When the 100 arrived in the fall of 1653, the population of Montreal was barely 50 people. They included Jacques Archambault, who dug the first well on the island in 1657, at the request of Maisonneuve.

Over time, the colony grew in size and eventually was large enough to be secure from the Haudenosaunee threat. Ownership of the colony was transferred from the missionary society to the Sulpicians in March 1663. As New France had been proclaimed a royal province in 1663, governance of Montreal was assumed by the Governor General and the Sovereign Council.

New France's governor general, Augustin de Saffray de Mésy, officially appointed Maisonneuve as governor of Montreal in October 1663. Maisonneuve objected, arguing that since the Sulpicians held the seigneurial rights, only they could appoint a governor. For the same reason, Maisonneuve objected to the establishment of a royal court at Montreal.

In September 1665, Alexandre de Prouville de Tracy, the Lieutenant Général of the Americas, ordered Maisonneuve to return to France on indefinite leave. After 24 years as head of the colony, he left Montreal for good.

== Later life ==
Settling in Paris, Maisonneuve lived in relative obscurity. In 1671, he welcomed Marguerite Bourgeoys at his home in Paris. With his encouragement she had established the Congregation of Notre Dame of Montreal in 1653, an order of teaching nuns that educated French and Indigenous children.

Maisonneuve died in Paris on 9 September 1676; at his bedside were his young friend, Philippe de Turmenys, and his devoted servant, Louis Fin. On September 10, his funeral and burial took place at the Church of the Fathers of the Christian Doctrine, near the abbey of Saint-Étienne-du-Mont.

== Honours ==
After his death, Rue Saint-Paul in Montreal was named after Maisonneuve, who had built his home in 1650 on the early street.

Nuns' Island was once called Île Saint-Paul in honour of the founder of Montreal. The current name of the island appears starting from the 19th century and was exclusively used from the 1950s on.

The Maisonneuve Monument was erected in 1895 on Place d'Armes in Old Montreal, to his memory. It is the work of Louis-Philippe Hébert (1850–1917). An imaginary model was used to represent Maisonneuve, as no authentic portrait exists of the first governor of Montreal.

De Maisonneuve Boulevard and Rue Chomedey in Downtown Montreal are named for him, as are Maisonneuve Park, the Collège de Maisonneuve, the neighbourhood of Chomedey in Laval, and the Maisonneuve pavilion, a dormitory at the Royal Military College Saint-Jean.

== Gallery ==
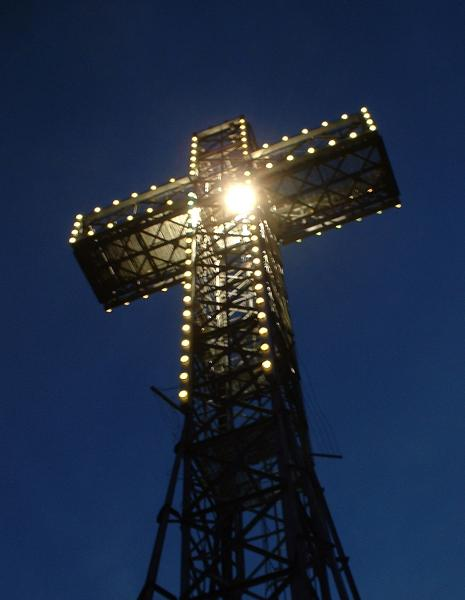
Mount Royal Cross. The first was erected by Paul de Chomdey de Maisonneuve on January 6, 1643

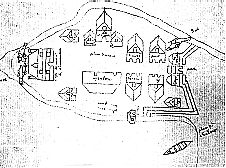
Montreal in 1647

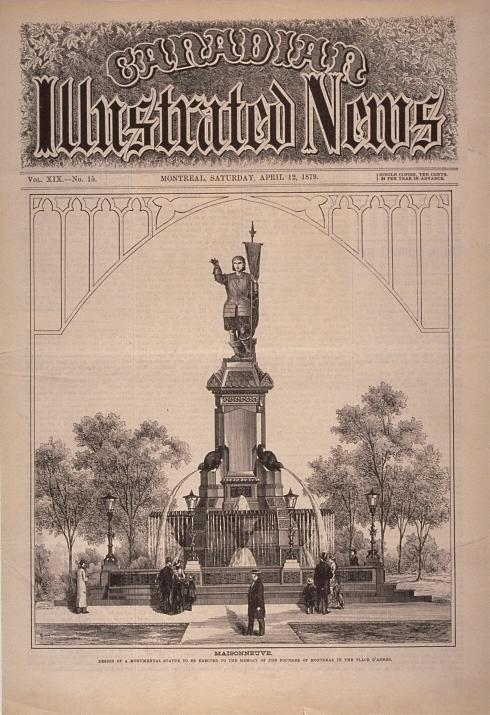
Projet Maisonneuve Monument, Canadian Illustrated News, 12 April 1879

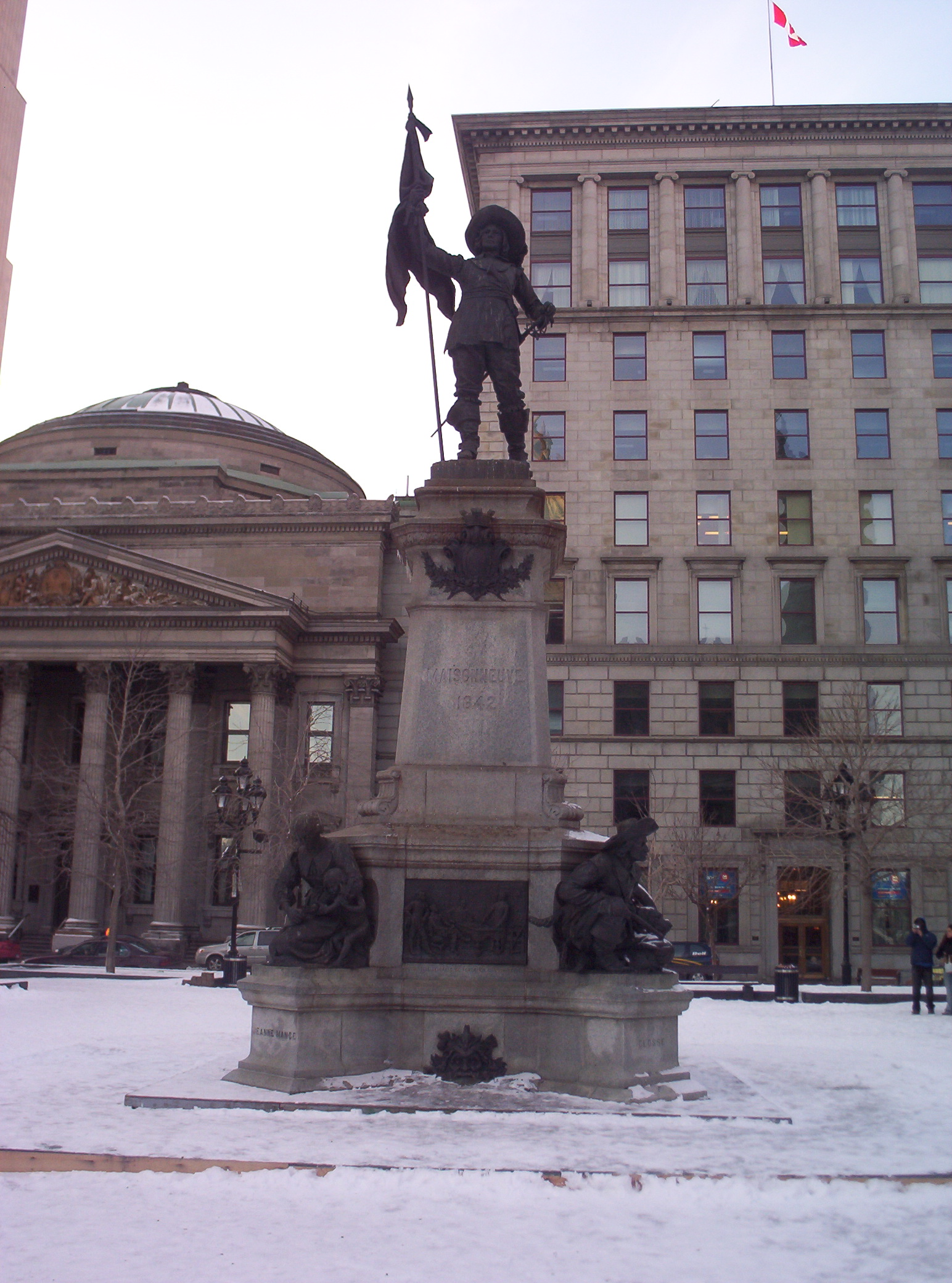
Maisonneuve Monument at the Place d'Armes

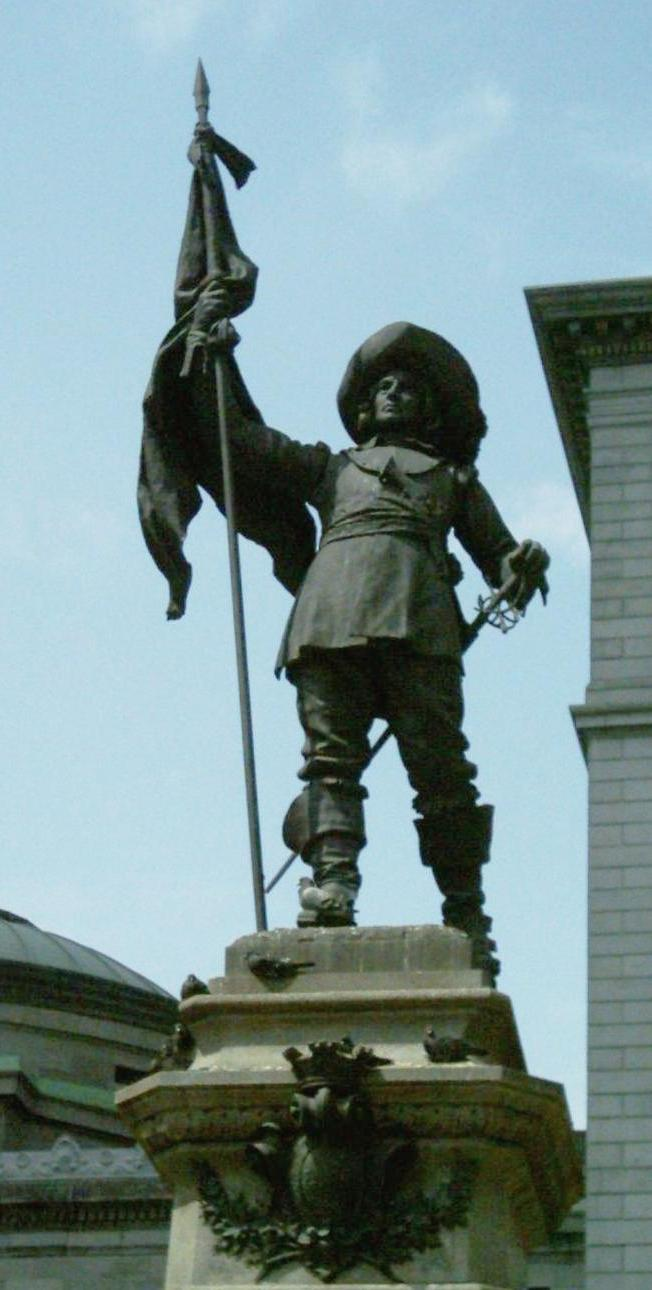
Maisonneuve Monument

== See also ==
- French colonization of the Americas
- Timeline of Montreal history

== Novels ==
- Lise Baucher-Morency / Gaëtane Breton, La périlleuse fondation de Ville-Marie, (book with musical CD) Éditions Planète rebelle (link) 2017

== Bibliography ==
- Lindsay, Lionel (1913). "Paul de Chomedey de Maisonneuve" . In Herbermann, Charles (ed.). Catholic Encyclopedia. Vol. 16. New York: Robert Appleton Company.
- Maude, Mary Mcdougall (9 June 2017). "Paul de Chomedey de Maisonneuve". The Canadian Encyclopedia (online ed.). Historica Canada.
- Chomedey de Maisonneuve. Heritage Minutes. Historica Canada.
