= Place d'Armes =

Square in Montreal, Quebec

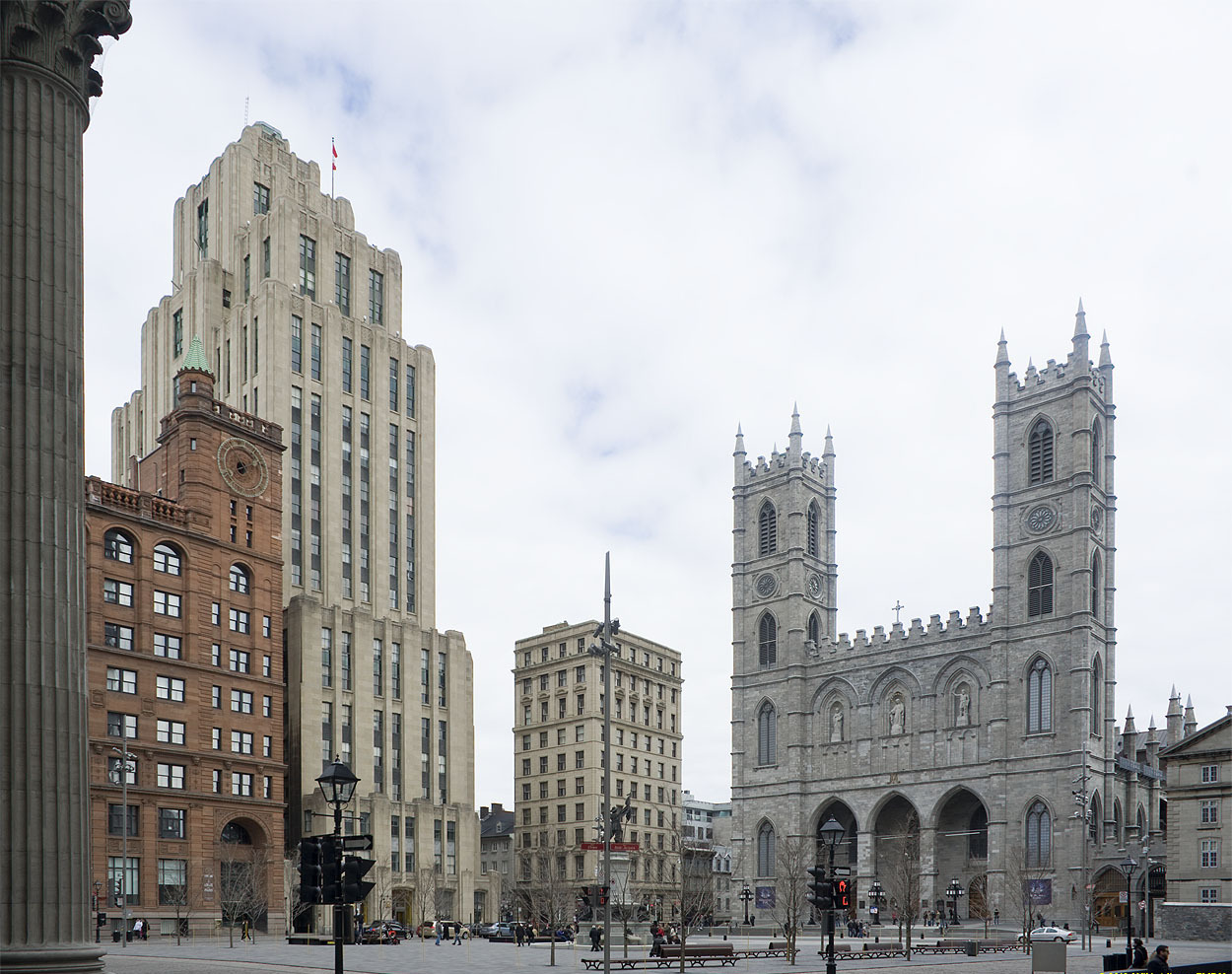
- Notre-Dame Basilica and Maisonneuve Monument viewed from Place d'Armes

- Location within Montreal
- Type: Town square
- Location: Old Montreal, Ville-Marie Montreal, Quebec, Canada
- Coordinates: 45°30′17″N 73°33′26″W
- Created: 1836
- Operator: City of Montreal
- Status: Open all year
- Public transit: Place-d'Armes (Montreal Metro)

Place d'Armes (French pronunciation: [plas daʁm]) is a square of the Old Montreal quarter of Montreal, Quebec, Canada. It is anchored by the Maisonneuve Monument, erected in memory of Paul de Chomedey, founder of Montreal. Buildings that surround it include Notre-Dame Basilica, Saint-Sulpice Seminary, New York Life Building, Aldred Building, Bank of Montreal head office and 500 Place D'Armes.

== History ==
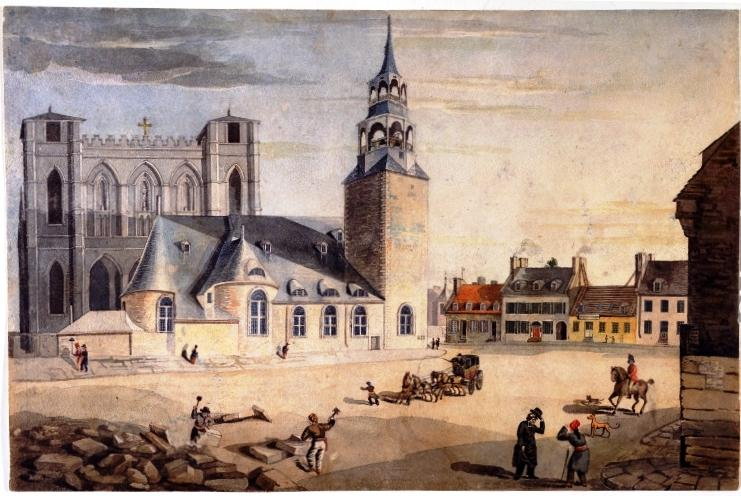
The square in 1828; the old church and new church in background.

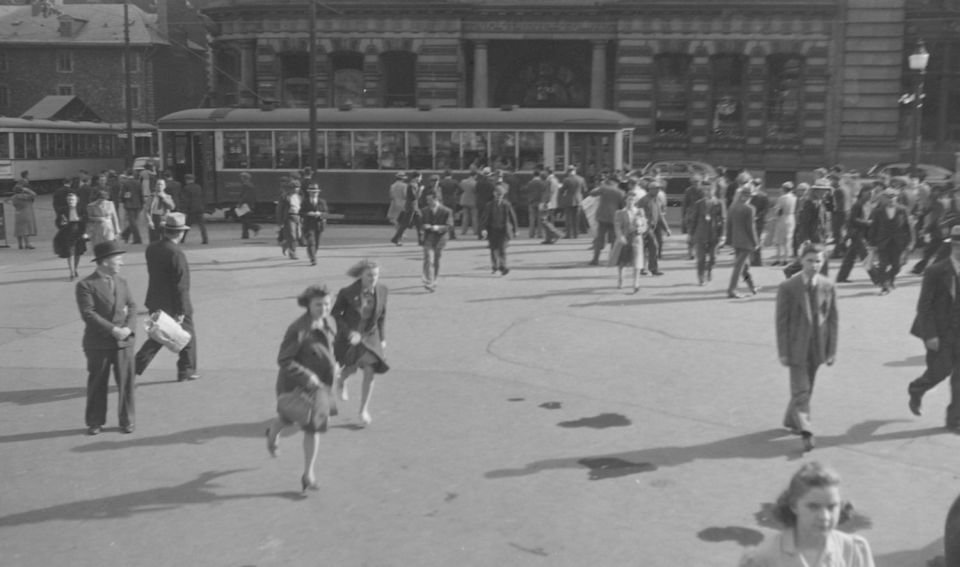
Place d'Armes in 1941

Place d'Armes is the second oldest public site in Montreal. It was called Place de la Fabrique when it was first developed in 1693, at the request of the Sulpicians, then later renamed Place d'Armes in 1721 when it became the stage of various military events. From 1781 to 1813, it was used as a hay and wood market, then developed as a Victorian garden after it was acquired by the city in 1836.

The current dimensions of Place d’Armes correspond roughly to a plan begun in 1845 and completed in 1850, when Notre-Dame Street was completed. It was not until the demolition of the Notre-Dame Church in 1830, and its bell tower in 1843, that the square would assume its current size.

=== Great Depression ===
During the Great Depression, Mayor Camillien Houde commissioned public works projects in Montreal, including more than 20 vespasiennes: public restrooms that locals had dubbed "Camilliennes." One such restroom was completed beneath Place d'Armes in 1934, designed by architect Jean-Omer Marchand in the Art Deco style, at a cost $51,255. The entire underground structure was 270 square metres. Two granite entrances allowed in natural light. The bathrooms were built with glass block windows, relatively rare in 1930s Montreal.

=== 1960s ===
There was a renovation of the square in the 1960s. The above-ground layout of the square would remain unchanged until 2009.

=== 1980 ===
By the 1940s, the Place d’Armes vespasienne had become run-down and dirty and was closed in 1980 for "moral and cleanliness reasons."

=== 2009–2011 ===
The City of Montreal began renovating Place d'Armes again in the second half of 2009. Work was completed in 2011 at a cost of $15.5 million. The work unearthed the former public washroom, along with the walls of the previous Notre-Dame Church and a water well called the "Puits Gadbois."

=== 2018 ===
In 2018, after a successful campaign led by an Indigenous high school teacher, the Bank of Montreal removed a plaque to Paul de Chomedy celebrating how he personally killed a Haudenosaunee chief in March 1644. The teacher expressed criticism of how the removal was done, arguing that the BMO should have placed another plaque next to it telling the story from an Aboriginal viewpoint instead.

== Monuments ==
=== George III Monument ===
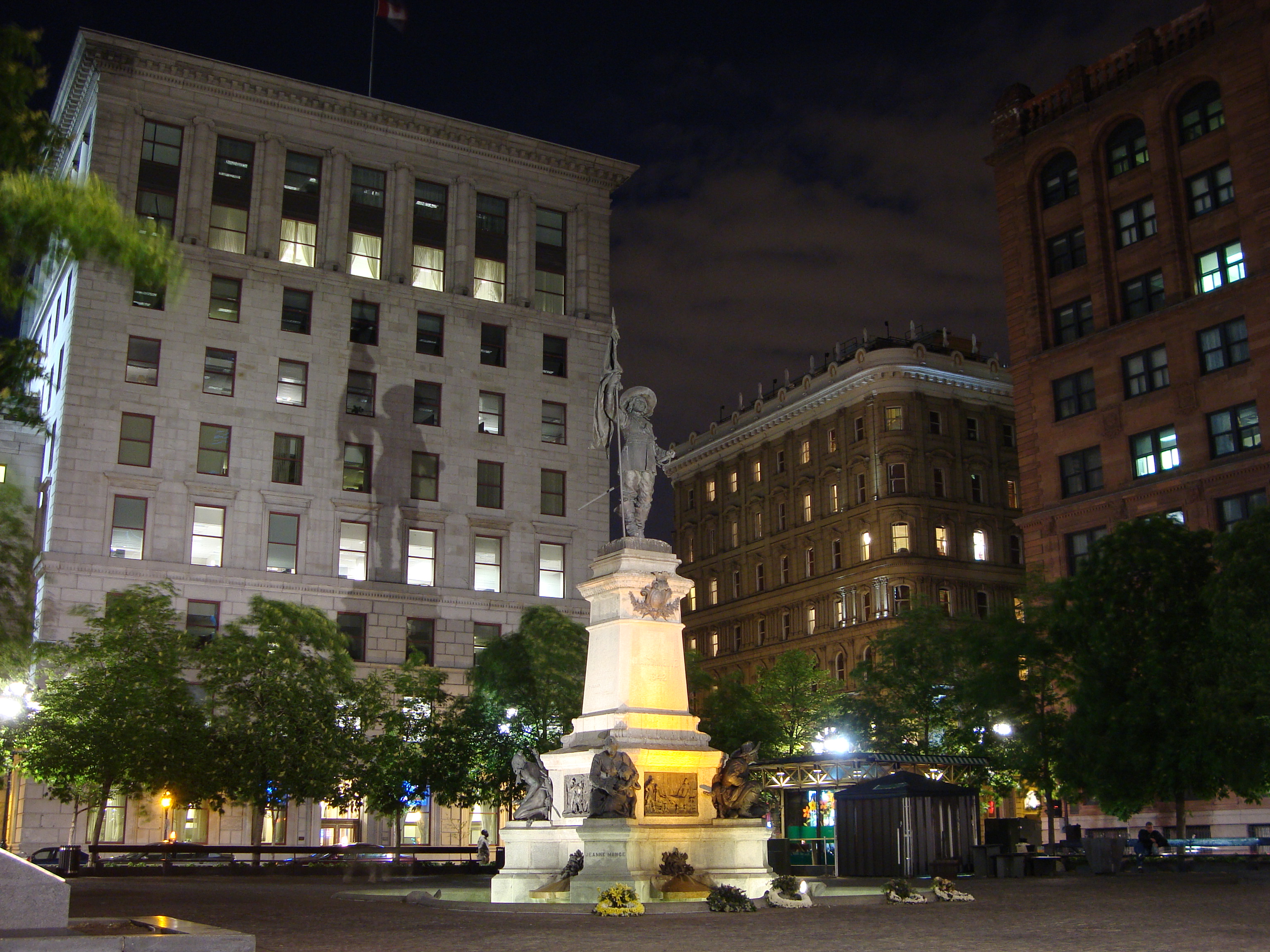
Place d'Armes with Maisonneuve Monument.

A monument to George III was erected in 1773 in Place d'Armes, the first known public monument in the city. On 1 May 1775, the bust of George III was found defaced in an act to denounce the Quebec Act which guarantees the use of the French language. A reward of 500 guineas did not lead to the apprehension of the culprit. It disappeared soon after, during the American invasion of Montreal (November 1775 – June 1776), and was only found several years later at the bottom of a well in the square.

=== Maisonneuve Monument ===
The square now features a monument in memory of Paul de Chomedey (1895), by artist Louis-Philippe Hébert, commemorating Chomedey's defense of the young French settlement against the Haudenosaunee, against whom de Maisonneuve's allies the Hurons were fighting. Foundations from the original Notre-Dame Church lie under the square.

== Surrounding structures ==
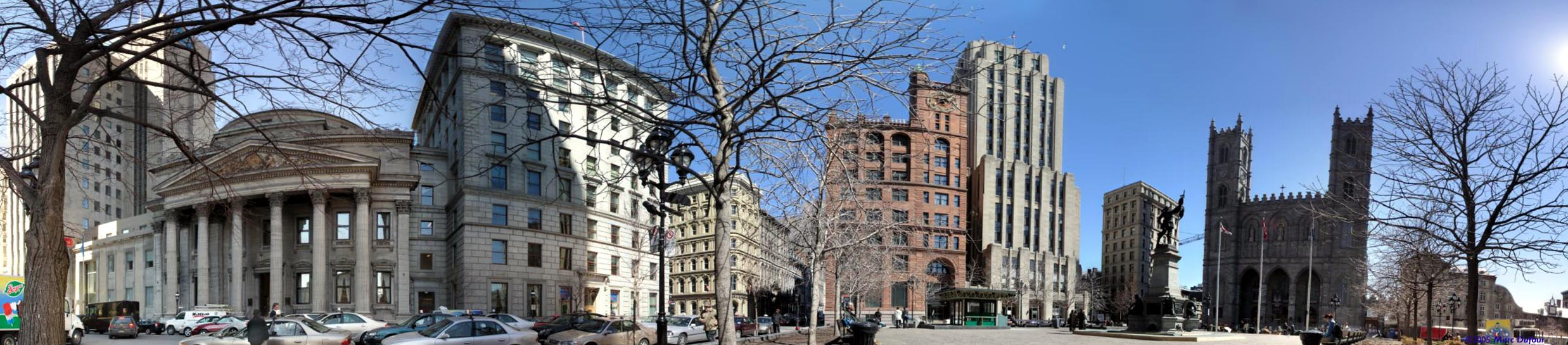
Panoramic view of Place d'Armes.

The buildings that surround it represent major periods of Montreal's development. Fronting the square is Notre-Dame Basilica and the Saint-Sulpice Seminary. Other structures include the New York Life Building (1887), Montreal's first high-rise; the Bank of Montreal head office (1859), Canada's first bank; the Art Deco Aldred Building. (1931) and the International style 500 Place D'Armes (1968).

== Access ==
Located between Saint Jacques and Notre-Dame streets, Place d'Armes is a departure point for calèches offering horse-drawn tours of Old Montreal. The Metro station of the same name is within walking distance. An 1801 plan to extend Place d'Armes down to Saint-Antoine Street to offer a more commanding view of Notre-Dame basilica was never realized. Instead it is connected to Saint-Antoine Street by the steep Côte de la Place-d'Armes.

Formerly, when Montreal's downtown and central business district centred on Old Montreal and Saint-Jacques Street (or St. James as it was then called), Place d'Armes was the hub of the city's tramway lines, with a depot to the north on Craig Street (now Saint-Antoine). A 1940s plan for the Montreal Metro planned a station directly underneath the square for easy transfer (the current station is a short distance to the north).

== Etymology ==
The Place d'Armes is the third location in Montreal to bear that name, a long-used French term for a place where a city's defenders assemble.
