= Aldred Building =

Art Deco skyscraper in Montreal

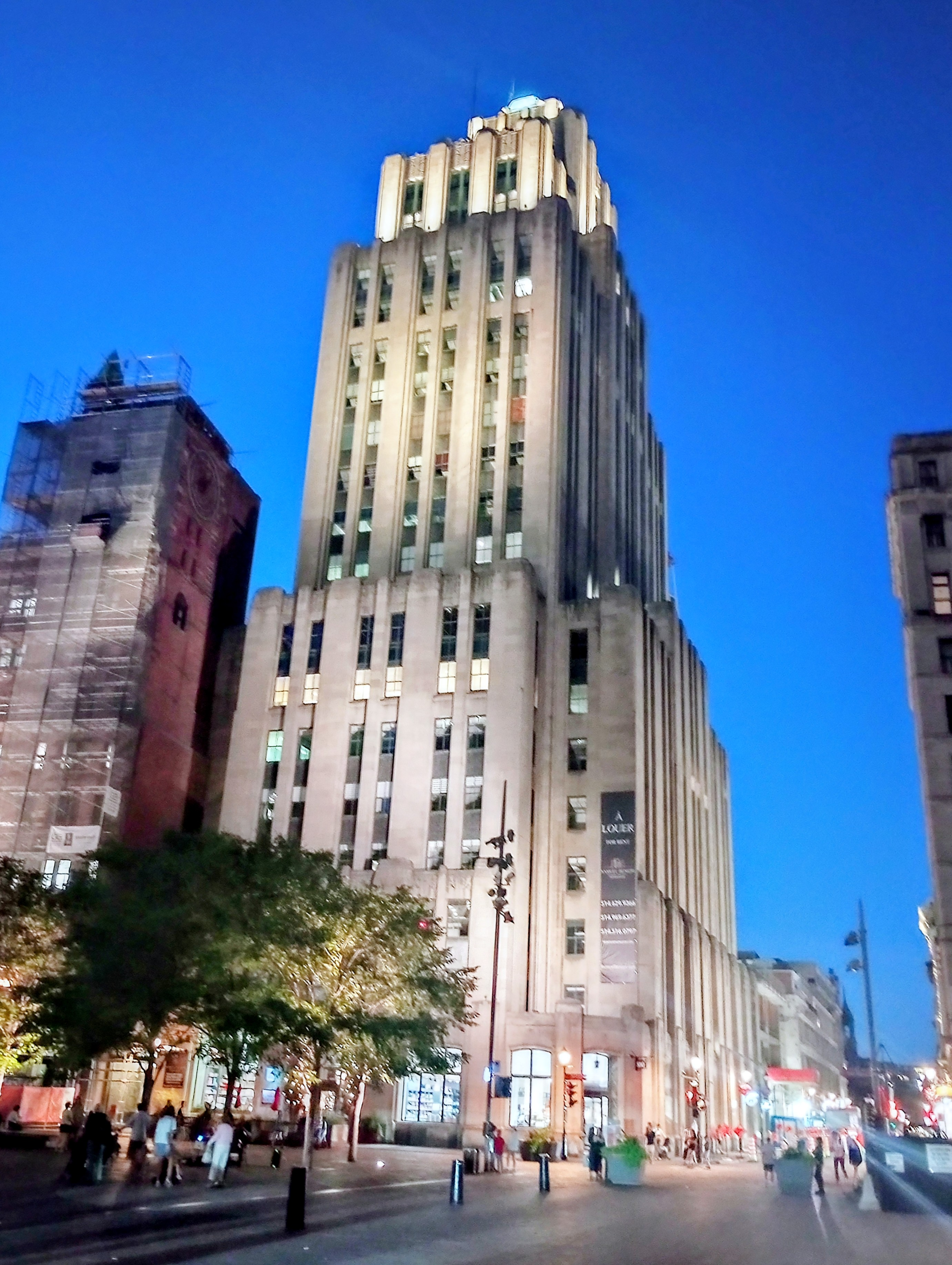

General information
- Status: Completed
- Type: Offices
- Architectural style: Art deco
- Location: 507 Place d'Armes, Montreal, Quebec, Canada
- Coordinates: 45°30′18″N 73°33′24″W
- Construction started: 1929
- Completed: 1930

Height
- Roof: 96.93 metres (318.0 ft)

Technical details
- Floor count: 23
- Lifts/elevators: 6 (Otis-Fensom Elevator Company Limited)

Design and construction
- Architects: Barott and Blackader

The Aldred Building (French: Édifice Aldred; also known as Édifice La Prévoyance) is an Art deco building on the historic Place d'Armes square in the Old Montreal quarter of Montreal, Quebec, Canada.

Completed in 1930, the building was designed by Ernest Isbell Barott, of the firm Barott and Blackader, with a height of 96 metres (316 ft) or 23 storeys. Built at a cost of $2,851,076.00 (equivalent to $57,091,058 in 2025), Barott endeavored to design a modern building which would, at the same time, fit with the square's historic surroundings. The building's setbacks at the 8th, 13th, and 16th floors allow more light on the square and create a cathedral-like massing, reflecting the adjacent Notre-Dame Basilica. The building uses limestone, common to other buildings in the area. The Aldred Building also attempts to address both Place d'Armes and Notre-Dame Street which do not meet at right angles, aligning with both streets until the third floor, where it then steps back and becomes square to Notre-Dame. The odd angle is small and not immediately noticeable from street-level.

The building resembles New York's Empire State Building, completed the same year, and was built for John E. Aldred of New York.

Barott began work on the Aldred Building around 1927, with original design for the building only 12 storeys tall, as building heights were limited to 130 feet (40 m) in Montreal until the passing of a bylaw allowing taller buildings provided they made use of setbacks to reduce their overall mass, similar to one in New York City.

Barott was able to take advantage of a 1929 clause in the bylaw that allowed buildings on public squares to exceed the then maximum height by up to 200 feet (61 m), if certain restrictions were adhered to. The building's total floor area is 238,946 square feet (22,198.8 m^{2}).

== Materials ==
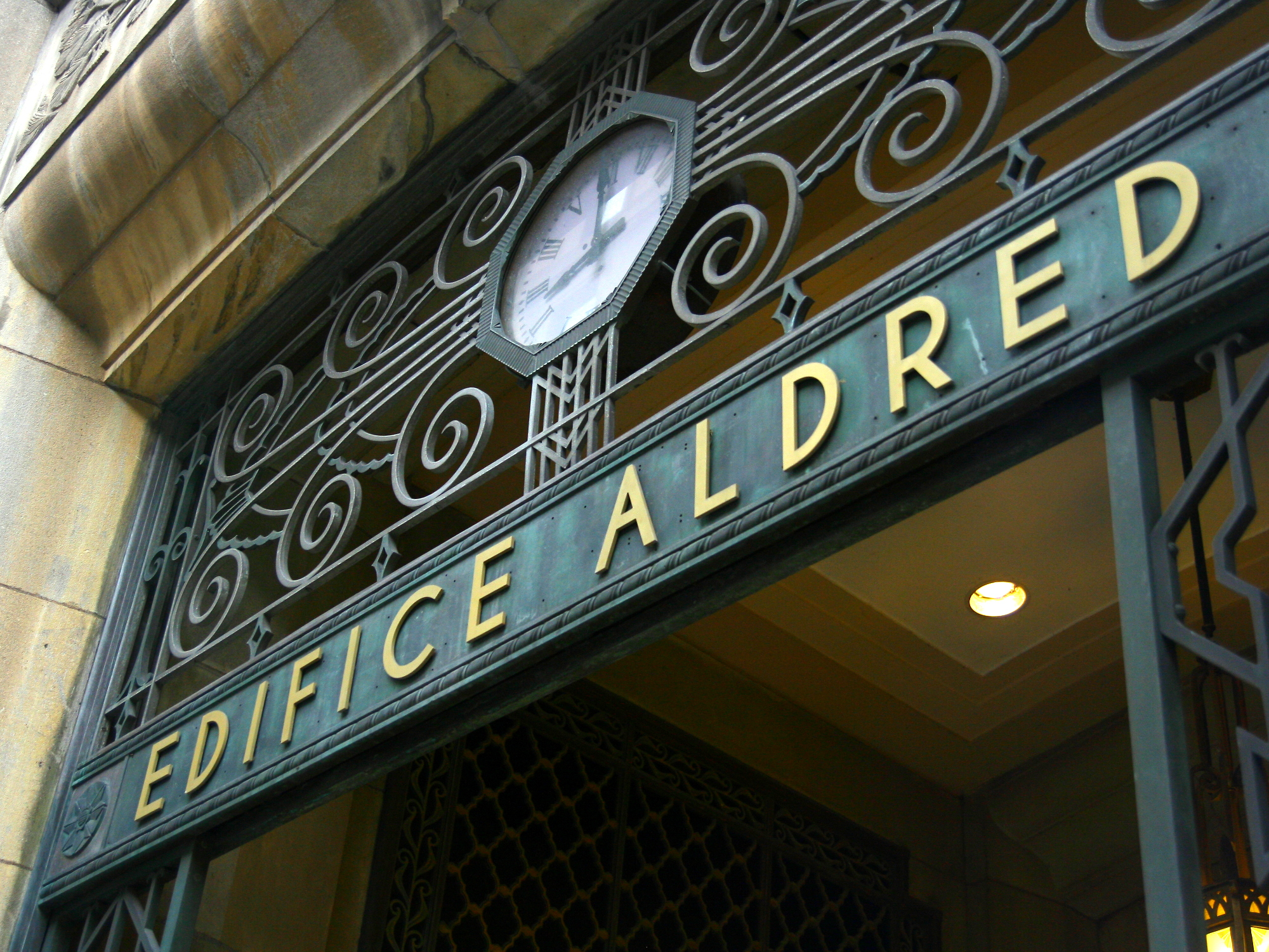
Labelled arch above the Aldred Building's main entrance

The exterior utilizes Indiana limestone set on a granite base in combination with aluminum spandrels. The interior doors are inlaid with white metal, with the exterior gates in bronze. Surrounding the doors and covering the walls and floors of the entrance lobby are a variety of marbles, including Belgian Black, Yellow Sienna, Tinos Greek, St. Genevieve Golden Vein, Verde Antique, and Moutonelle. Flooring above the ground level is made of terrazzo with brass strips. Bronze also makes up the frames for windows of the ground floor bank, and is used in trim throughout the building along with stainless steel.

The steel structure of the building is supported two floors below street level on a solid concrete mat which is nine feet thick. The steel is fireproofed with terra-cotta tiles and supports reinforced concrete floors. The steel structure allows for a total of 840 windows, which cover approximately 20 percent of the building's surface area. Numerous services in the Aldred Building identify it as a modern structure, including conditioned ventilation in the basement and first nine floors, with fresh air 'washed' and filtered in an air-cleaner. The Aldred Building features a central vacuum system, an electric time-clock system, an incinerator, paper baler and an ozone machine in the kitchen to eliminate odours. All the floors contain built-in ducts for electrical and telephone cables. The six high-speed elevators were the most modern available in the day, and were installed by Otis-Fensom. The cars travel at 700 feet (210 m) per minute and have teak interiors.

Aldred Building in Old Montreal
