= Saint-Sulpice Seminary =

Saint-Sulpice Seminary may refer to:

- Saint-Sulpice, Paris, a church building
- Saint-Sulpice Seminary (France), a school in France
- Saint-Sulpice Seminary (Montreal), a school in Canada
- Ancien séminaire Saint-Sulpice, a building in Paris, France, built in 1838
- Saint-Sulpice Seminary building, a building in Paris, France (1646-1803)
