= Healy family =

Notable Black Catholic family

Healys of Georgia
- Current region: United States
- Origin: Ireland; Africa
- Founded: 1829
- Founder: Michael Morris Healy
- Titles: List: Bishop; Jesuit; Mother Superior

The Healy family was an Irish-American and African-American family notable for the high achievements of its first generation of children, who were born into slavery in Georgia in the second half of the nineteenth century.

Among them were James, America's first known Black Catholic priest (and bishop); Patrick, the first Black Jesuit, PhD, and university president (he was the 29th president of Georgetown); Michael, the first African American to command a federal ship; and Eliza, one of the first Black Catholic mother superiors.

== History ==
=== Family background (Michael and Mary) ===
The most recent immigrant ancestor, Michael Morris Healy, was born on September 20, 1796, in the town of Athlone in County Roscommon, Ireland. He emigrated to the United States, possibly by way of Canada, arriving in 1818. Through good fortune in a Georgia land lottery and later acquisitions, he eventually acquired more than 1,500 acres (6.1 km^{2}) of good "bottomland" near the Ocmulgee River in Jones County, across the river from the market town of Macon. He became one of the more prominent and successful planters in an area known for cotton, and eventually owned 49-60 slaves for his labor-intensive enterprise.

Among these was a 16-year-old girl named Mary Eliza (whose surname has been recorded both as Smith and Clark). Mary Eliza Smith/Clark, has been described in various accounts as "slave" and "former slave", and as mulatto, octoroon, and African American (which includes mixed-race). In the South, children born to slave women had the legal status of slaves, regardless of their paternity, because of the principle in slave law of partus sequitur ventrem, which was adopted in the late 17th century throughout the South. They were legally slaves, regardless of their ancestry or religion. As shorthand mixed-race slaves were sometimes classified as black, but the term "mulatto", which recognized mixed race, was also used in census records for both slaves and free persons. This term was used in the U.S. census until 1930, when it was removed because of opposition from the Southern block in Congress. In Louisiana, free people of color formed a third class in the colonial era, and their descendants have become known as Creoles of Color. These free mixed-race people gained education and property before the American Civil War, sometimes as a result of settlements on women and children in the system of plaçage.

The union of Michael Morris and Mary Eliza Healy was relatively formalized; unions were common between white men and mixed-race or black women. He was not the only white man to take an African-American wife or concubine and to have the wealth to provide for the education of their mixed-race children. For example, shortly before the start of the American Civil War, nearly all the 200 young men at Wilberforce University in southern Ohio, established by white and black Ohio Methodist leaders for the education of blacks, were mixed-race sons of wealthy white Southern planters.

At the time, Georgia law (and that of most other states) prohibited interracial marriage, as well as education of all blacks, free or slave. Some accounts suggest that Mary Eliza was freed but it was unlikely.

The state legislature required a separate act for each manumission desired by a slaveholder, even for one's family members. These difficulties essentially prohibited White fathers in the South freeing their slave children and concubines. But the Healy couple lived together as husband and wife from 1829 until their deaths a few months apart in 1850, and they had intended to move to the free North with their youngest children. During that time they had ten children, nine of whom survived to adulthood.

=== The Healy children ===
The laws in Georgia prohibited the education of blacks, whether slave or free. Such anti-literacy laws had been instituted in southern states following Nat Turner's slave rebellion in 1831.

To overcome obstacles for his children, Healy explored schools in the North in 1837. Two of his sisters and their families had settled in New York City, but boarding schools there would not accept the mixed-race James, the oldest son. Born in 1830, James was enrolled in a Quaker school in Flushing, New York in 1837. After completing elementary school, he attended a Quaker preparatory school in Burlington, New Jersey. Some of James's younger brothers followed him in this path. At the Quaker schools, the boys faced criticism because their father was a slaveholder, which was in conflict with Quaker principles of equality of men. They also faced discrimination as Irish Catholics at a time of greatly increased immigration to the United States during the Great Famine.

Around 1844, the senior Michael Healy met John Bernard Fitzpatrick, the Catholic bishop of the Diocese of Boston. He learned of the new College of the Holy Cross in Worcester, Massachusetts, which was accepting children of grammar school age in its boarding preparatory school. In 1844, Healy sent his sons James (14), Hugh (12), Patrick (10), and Sherwood (8), to be enrolled at Holy Cross, and they all graduated from the college. The fifth son, Michael, then only 6 years old, followed a few years later, enrolling in 1849 at Holy Cross.

The Healy parents intended to sell their plantation and move to the North with their three youngest children. When the parents each died unexpectedly in 1850, their son Hugh Healy risked his freedom to return to Georgia from New York to take his three youngest siblings to the North. Still legally a slave in Georgia, he could have been captured by slave catchers and sold in the slave trade. After graduating from Holy Cross, Hugh Healy had moved to New York City, where he was building a hardware business. Executors of his parents' estate liquidated the plantation and other assets, while Hugh returned to New York with his younger siblings. There he arranged for them to be baptized as Catholics in the Church of St. Francis Xavier on June 13, 1851. Hugh Healy died at age 21 as a result of an infection contracted after a boating accident in the Hudson River.

Because of their mother's mixed ancestry, the Healy children were more than half European as well as partially African in ancestry. Much evidence exists that, with the social capital of their education and father's wealth, the Healy children were accepted into northern U.S. and Canadian society as "white" Irish Americans.

==== Careers ====
Most of the second-generation descendants became prominent as leaders within the Catholic Church. They were mixed-race children of Mary Eliza Smith, a mulatto slave, and her common-law husband, Michael Morris Healy, an Irish Catholic immigrant from County Roscommon. He became a wealthy cotton planter in Jones County.

Majority White in ancestry, the children varied in appearance, with Alexander being the darkest and others being more or less able to pass. Georgia prohibited slaves from being educated, but since Healy was determined to provide a future for his children, he sent them north for their educations, as did some other wealthy planters with mixed-race children. The Healy children were baptized and educated there, and gained opportunities as Irish Catholics.^{[α]}

Most of the sons first attended Quaker boarding schools in New York and New Jersey before transferring to a Catholic school in Massachusetts. All but the fifth son graduated from college. James, Patrick and Sherwood Healy all undertook graduate studies at the Saint-Sulpice Seminary in Paris, and the latter two earned doctorates there. The three daughters were educated at long-established Catholic convent schools in Montreal, Quebec, Canada.

Of the nine children who lived to adulthood, three of the sons became ordained Catholic priests and educators, one died at 21, and all three daughters became nuns. (One of the daughters later left the order, married an Irish immigrant, and had a son.)

Since the late 20th century, especially, their achievements have been recognized as "firsts" for people of known African-American descent. James Augustine Healy became the first American bishop of African-American descent, Patrick Francis Healy was president of Georgetown College, and Eliza Healy attained the rank of Mother Superior in Vermont, one of the first African-American women to hold such a position.

Michael Healy had a 20-year career with the United States Revenue Cutter Service. Today he is noted as the first person of African-American descent to command a federal ship. Three of the Healy children have been individually honored by the naming of various buildings, awards, and a ship for them. The former site of the Healy family's plantation near Macon, Georgia is now called River North. It was developed in 1973 by Robert J. Adams Jr. and includes the Healy Point Country Club. A memorial stone honoring the Healy Family was placed in the 1,600 acres (650 ha) subdivision and it still stands today.

Under slave law and the principle of partus sequitur ventrem, adopted in Virginia in the 17th century, the children were legally slaves, as they were born to an enslaved mother. They were classified on the census as mulatto; the U.S. census until 1930 acknowledged mixed race. Their lives have intrigued historians, sociologists, and commentators because of the Healys' high achievements and their immigrant and ethnic complexity.

== Members ==
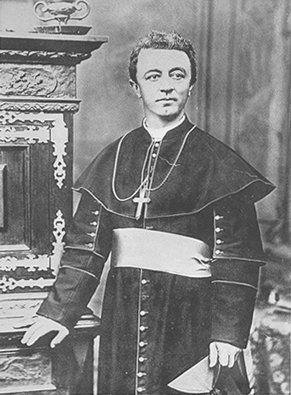
James Augustine Healy

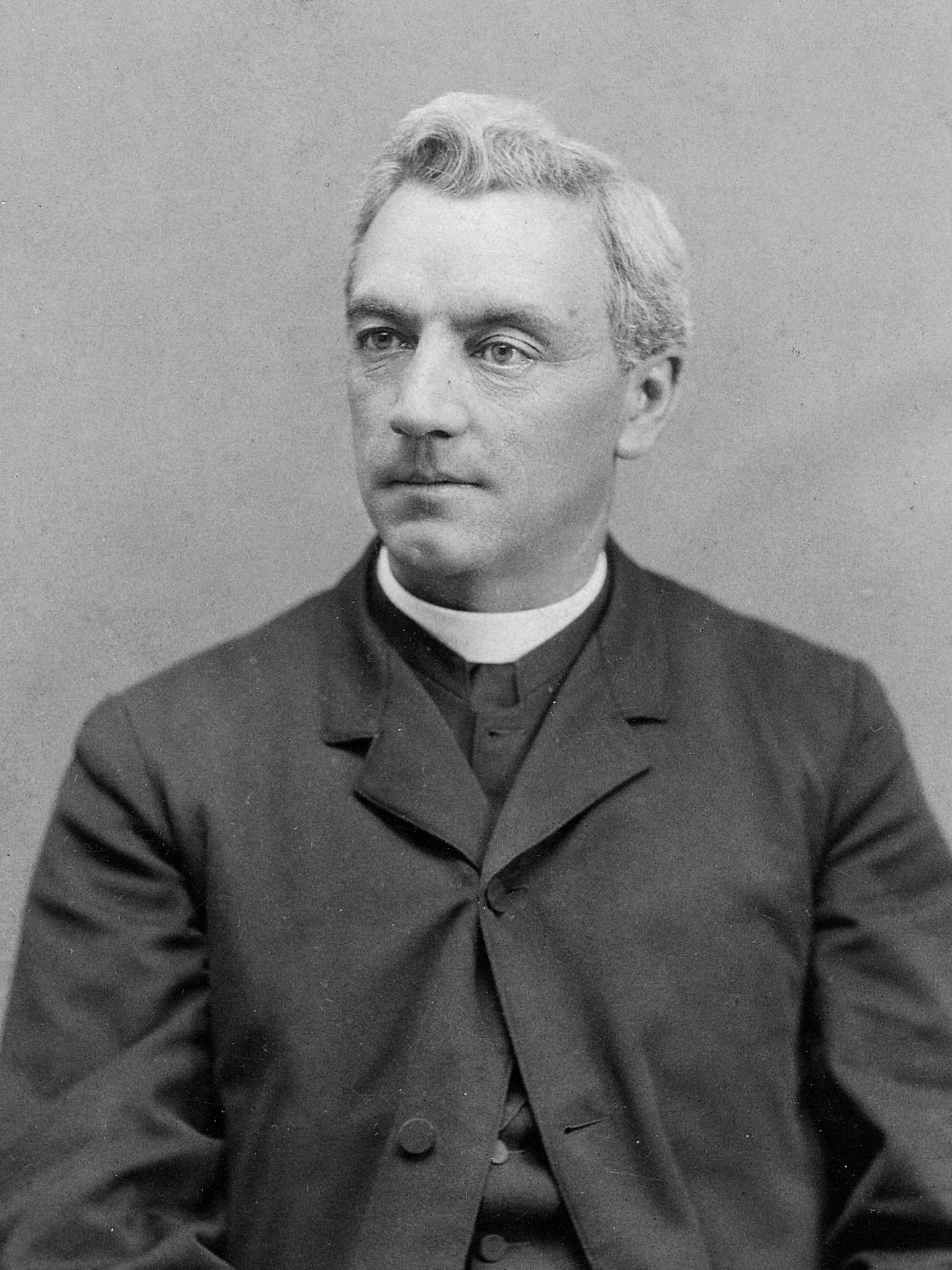
Patrick Francis Healy

=== James Augustine Healy ===
James Augustine Healy (1830–1900) graduated valedictorian of the Holy Cross's first graduating class in 1849. He became a priest in the Diocese of Boston. He was later consecrated as Bishop of Portland, Maine on June 2, 1875. At a period of rapid growth in Catholic immigration, Healy oversaw the establishment of 60 new churches, 68 missions, 18 convents and 18 schools in the diocese. Since the late 20th century, he has been considered the first American with African-American ancestry to serve as a Catholic bishop in the United States. Albert S. Foley wrote the first book-length biography of Healy, published in 1954, and also discussed his siblings.

In 1962, Holy Cross christened its newest dormitory as Healy Hall in his honor, for his achievements in developing the Catholic diocese in Maine.

=== Patrick Francis Healy ===
Patrick Francis Healy (1834–1910) became a Jesuit. He was the first American with African ancestry to earn a PhD, completing it at Saint-Sulpice Seminary in Paris. He was named a dean at Georgetown University in 1866. At the age of 39, on July 31, 1874, he assumed the presidency of what was then the largest Catholic college in the United States, now the first known African American to do so.

Patrick Healy's influence on Georgetown University was so far-reaching that he is often referred to as the school's "second founder," following Archbishop John Carroll. Healy helped develop the small nineteenth-century college as a major university for the twentieth century. He modernized the curriculum by requiring courses in the sciences, particularly chemistry and physics. He expanded and upgraded the schools of law and medicine. In the antebellum years, the college had drawn most of its students from the South; four-fifths of the alumni fought as Confederates. In the later nineteenth century, it began to draw more students from the Northeast, which had a higher rate of Catholic immigration. During Healy's tenure, the college adopted the colors of blue and grey as a symbol of reconciliation for the nation. Healy Hall, which currently houses Georgetown University's undergraduate admissions office, is named after him.

=== Alexander Sherwood Healy ===
Alexander Sherwood Healy, referred to simply as Sherwood (1836–1875), was also ordained as a priest, in Paris in 1858. He earned a doctorate degree at the Saint-Sulpice Seminary in Paris thereafter. He became an expert in Gregorian chant and earned a doctorate in canon law in Rome. He was assigned to the Diocese of Boston, joining his brother James. After serving him as the local chancellor, he was appointed director of the Catholic seminary in Troy, New York, and later as rector of the cathedral in Boston. Sherwood, like other pastors, generally deferred presiding over baptisms and marriages, leaving them and the usual honorariums to the junior clergy. He died at age 39.

=== Michael Augustine Healy ===
Michael Augustine Healy (1838–1904) was the fifth son. Unhappy and rebellious at Holy Cross, he was sent at the age of 15 to a seminary in France. He preferred a more adventurous life, and fled the school the following year. In England, he signed aboard the American East Indian Clipper Jumna as a cabin boy in 1854. He quickly became an expert seaman. Soon he rose to the rank of officer on merchant vessels.

In 1864, Michael Healy returned to his siblings, who were then mostly based in Boston. He applied for a commission in the Revenue Cutter Service and was accepted as a Third Lieutenant.

Healy served with the US Revenue Service along the 20,000-mile (32,000 km) coastline of the new territory following the Alaska Purchase of 1867. In 1880, he was assigned command of a US government ship.

During the last two decades of the 19th century, Captain Healy was essentially the federal government's law enforcement presence in the vast territory. He also supervised providing aid to residents and seamen. In his twenty years of service between San Francisco and Point Barrow, he acted as: judge, doctor, and policeman to Alaskan natives, merchant seamen and whaling crews.

In the late 20th century, Healy was recognized as the first man of African-American descent to command a US ship. The U.S. Coast Guard research icebreaker USCGC Healy, commissioned in 1999, is named in his honor.

=== Eliza Healy ===
Eliza Healy (1846–1919), educated in Saint-Jean, Quebec, joined her family in Boston and lived there for several years. Feeling a calling to the religious life, she traveled to Montreal. There she entered the novitiate in the Congregation of Notre Dame in 1874 and took her vows that year. They were the teaching order of her school and had been established in 1653 by a French nun. After teaching in schools in Quebec and Ontario, Sister Mary Magdalen, as she was known, was named in 1895 as superior of a convent in Huntingdon, Quebec; she served there until 1897.

In 1903 Healy returned to the US when she was appointed school administrator and Mother Superior of a Catholic convent, Villa Barlow, in St. Albans, Vermont. In her 15 years there, Sister Mary Magdalen restored the complex's facilities and finances. In her last year, Sister Mary Magdalen served as Mother Superior for the Congregation of Notre Dame at the Academy of Our Lady of the Blessed Sacrament on Staten Island, New York, where she restored their finances.

Though it has been claimed by some (since the late 20th century) that Eliza Healy was the first known African-American woman to be appointed a Mother Superior, she was preceded in that position by at least two such women, Mothers Mary Lange of Baltimore and Henriette Delille of New Orleans, each of whom led African-American congregations of women.

=== Others ===
- Hugh Healy (1832–1853) was a graduate of Holy Cross and an aspiring businessman in New York when he died at age 21.

All three of the Healy girls, Martha, Josephine, and Eliza, were educated from childhood at the convent school of the Congregation of Notre Dame in Montreal. They became nuns, following the women and the institution that had been influential in their lives.

- Martha Healy (1840–1920) joined the Congregation of Notre Dame in Montreal in 1855. In 1863 she left the order and moved to Boston, joining two brothers and her sisters in that region. On July 25, 1865, in Waltham, Massachusetts, she married Jeremiah Cashman, an Irish immigrant. They had a child.
- Josephine Amanda Healy (1849–1883), also went to the convent school. After several years living with family members in the Boston area, she joined the order of the Religious Hospitallers of Saint Joseph. She was the third of the siblings to die relatively young.
- Eugene Healy (1848–1914), only two when orphaned, was the only Healy who did not achieve as much in life; he seemed to struggle to find a place.

==== Further descendants ====
Martha and Michael, who both married and had children, each chose Irish Catholic spouses. In 1865, Michael married Mary Jane Roach, the daughter of Irish Catholic immigrants. They had one surviving child, a son named Frederick Aloysius (1870–1912). According to James M. O'Toole, a historian who wrote about the family and the conundrum of race:

[Michael A. Healy] repeatedly referred to white settlers [in Alaska] as "our people," and was able to pass this racial identity on to a subsequent generation. His teenage son Fred, who accompanied his father on a voyage in 1883, scratched his name into a rock on a remote island above the Arctic Circle, proudly telling his diary that he was the first "white boy" to do so.

Frederick Healy worked as a newspaperman in San Francisco before becoming a partner in a business firm. On April 12, 1906, he married Edith Rutland Hemming of Colorado Springs, Colorado; they had three sons. Edith Hemming was a daughter of banker and former Confederate soldier Charles C. Hemming, from Jacksonville, Florida. Frederick died of typhoid fever at his home in Santa Barbara, California. He was buried with his parents in Holy Cross Cemetery in Colma, California.

== Family relationship to Ellen Craft ==
In February 2024, Washington Post writer Bryan Greene established through DNA evidence that the Healy siblings were blood relatives of abolitionist Ellen Craft, likely first cousins based on historical accounts. DNA test results showed that a descendant of Martha Healy was 4th to 8th cousins with three of Crafts' descendants. In 1848, Craft escaped slavery in Macon, Georgia, not far from the Healys' birthplace, disguising herself as a white man traveling with her enslaved attendant, her actual husband.

== See also ==
- Chubb family (United States)

== Footnotes ==
α. O' Toole (2003), commented on the brothers on p. 58: "....Sherwood ...had the darkest complexion and other features that contemporaries associated with blacks. James might arouse only vague suspicions about his background in the minds of those who met him for the first time, and Patrick was light-skinned enough that unknowing strangers would never guess that he had any "blood" in his veins other than that of white ancestors. Sherwood could not hide behind any uncertainty. His skin was dark, his short hair had the tight kinks that common understanding identified with African Americans, and his face bore the nose and lips so frequently caricatured on the minstrel stage. One of his adult passports would later describe his complexion as unambiguously "dark", in contrast to his "light" and even "fair" brothers."

== Bibliography ==
- Foley, Albert S. Bishop Healy: Beloved Outcaste: The Story of a Great Priest Whose Life has Become a Legend (New York: Strauss and Young, 1954), available online
- Foley, Albert S. God’s Men of Color: The Colored Catholic Priests of the United States, 1854–1954 (New York: Strauss and Young, 1955), available at Googlebooks
- Newman, Richard, "Patrick Francis Healy", American National Biography Online Feb. 2000 (subscription only)
- O'Toole, James M., Passing for White: Race, Religion, and the Healy Family, 1820–1920, University of Massachusetts Press, 2003, ISBN 1-55849-417-0
- Strobridge, Truman R.; Noble, Dennis L., Alaska and the U.S. Revenue Cutter Service: 1867–1915, Naval Institute Press, 1999, ISBN 1-55750-845-3
