= Patrick Francis Healy =

American Jesuit educator (1834–1910)

The Reverend Patrick Francis Healy SJ
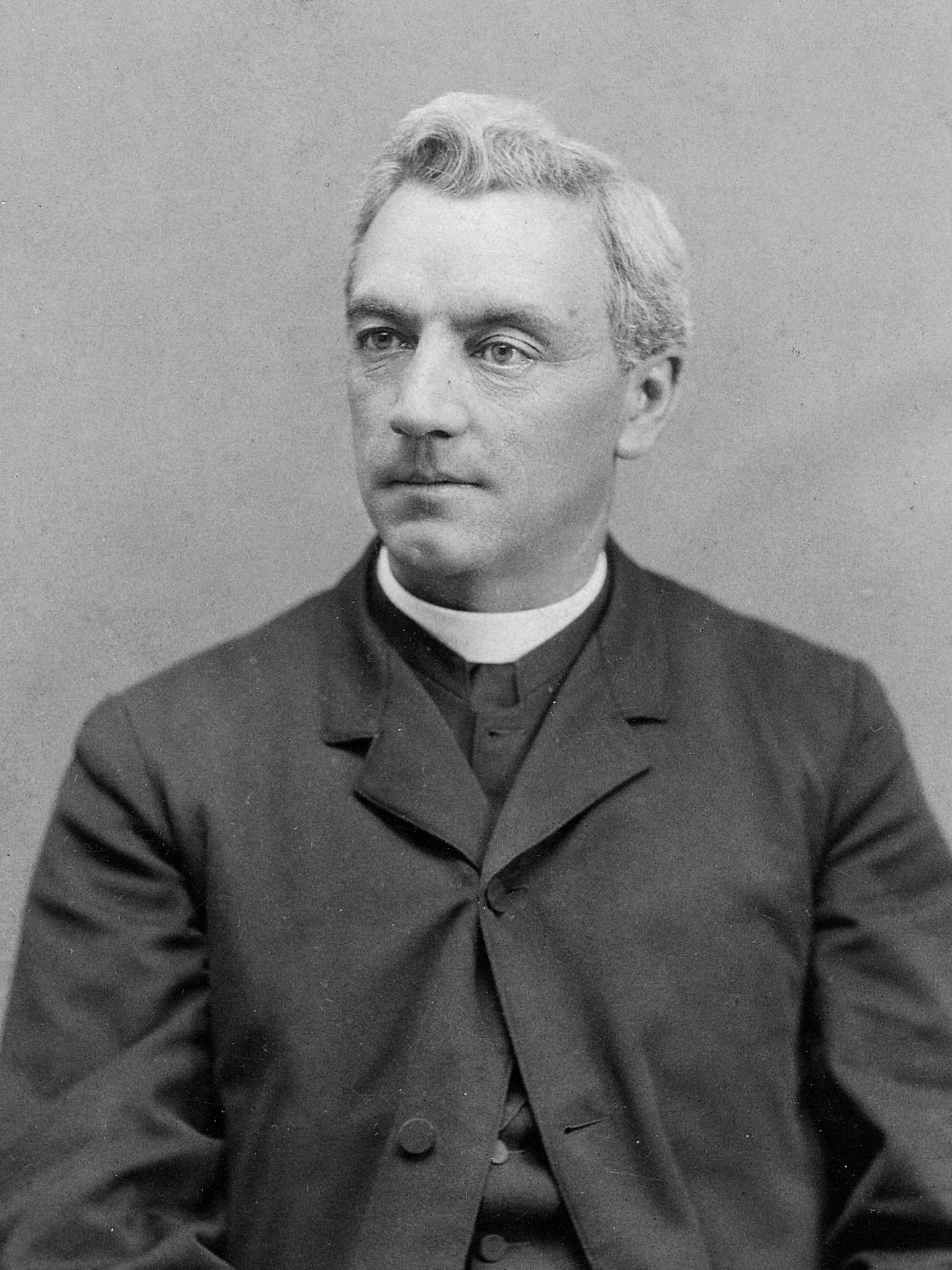
- Healy in 1882

29th President of Georgetown University
- In office 1873–1882
- Preceded by: John Early
- Succeeded by: James A. Doonan

Personal details
- Born: February 27, 1834 Macon, Georgia, U.S.
- Died: January 10, 1910 (aged 75) Washington, D.C., U.S.
- Resting place: Jesuit Community Cemetery
- Relatives: Healy family
- Education: College of the Holy Cross (BA); Saint-Sulpice Seminary; Catholic University of Louvain (PhD)

Orders
- Ordination: September 3, 1864

Patrick Francis Healy SJ (February 27, 1834 – January 10, 1910) was an American Catholic priest and Jesuit who was an influential president of Georgetown University, becoming known as its "second founder". The university's flagship building, Healy Hall, bears his name. Though he considered himself and was widely accepted as White, Healy was posthumously recognized as the first Black American to earn a PhD, as well as the first to enter the Jesuit order and to become the president of a predominantly White university.

Healy was born in Georgia to a family that produced many Catholic leaders. His mother was one-eighth Black and his father was a White Irish emigrant. Under Georgia law, Healy's father technically owned his wife and children as slaves. Healy and his siblings were sent north by their father to be educated at the College of the Holy Cross, and Healy continued his higher education in Belgium at the Catholic University of Louvain, where he received his doctorate in philosophy in 1864. He returned to America and started as the chair of philosophy at Georgetown University.

Healy was elected president of Georgetown University in 1873 and appointed rector the following year. Seeking to transform the institution into a modern university, he oversaw a period of extensive growth. He increased the prominence of the sciences, raised the standards of the School of Medicine, and oversaw a rapid expansion of the Law School. He also constructed a grand building that became known as Healy Hall, which left the university in substantial debt. In 1882, he went to live with his brother, James, the Bishop of Portland, Maine, and the two traveled extensively throughout Europe. Afterwards, Healy returned to pastoral work in Rhode Island and New York City, before returning to Georgetown, where he died.

== Early life ==
Healy was born on February 27, 1834, in a log cabin in Macon, Georgia. Patrick's father, Michael Morris Healy, had emigrated from Ireland to the United States, through Canada, in 1818. On land that he won in the Georgia Land Lotteries, he established a cotton plantation on the banks of the Ocmulgee River. He was highly successful and eventually became one of the largest landowners in Jones County, with 1,500 acres (610 hectares). He eventually owned 49 slaves, one of whom was Patrick's mother, Mary Eliza Smith. (Note: Eliza was also documented as having the surname Clark, rather than Smith.) Michael Healy had purchased her in 1829 from a cotton magnate, Sam Griswold, for whom she was a house slave. Eliza was one-eighth Black, known as an octoroon, (Note: Eliza was also described as a mulatta.) making her children one-sixteenth Black. One of her parents had fled Saint-Domingue for the United States in the 1790s, during the Haitian Revolution.

As interracial marriage was prohibited by Georgia's anti-miscegenation law, Michael formed an unofficial relationship with the 16-year-old Eliza in 1829. While the Catholic Church did recognize interracial marriages, there were no priests in Macon County at that time to officiate. At the time, their household was unusual among interracial marriages in the South in that neither had ever married anyone else, and they lived with each other faithfully for the rest of their lives until both died in 1850.

Patrick was the third of 10 siblings, eight of whom would survive into adulthood. His three sisters would go on to become nuns, including Eliza Healy, who became one of the first black mothers superior of a convent. Two of his brothers would become priests; one of them, James Augustine Healy, would become the Bishop of Portland, Maine, and the first Black Catholic bishop in the United States. Another brother, Michael, became a prominent captain in the U.S. Revenue Cutter Service in Alaska. Patrick and all of his siblings were born as slaves, as by the legal doctrine of partus sequitur ventrem, they inherited the legal status of their mother. Michael Healy was prevented by Georgia law from manumitting his wife or children, which could be done only by an act of the Georgia General Assembly in exceptional circumstances.

=== Education ===
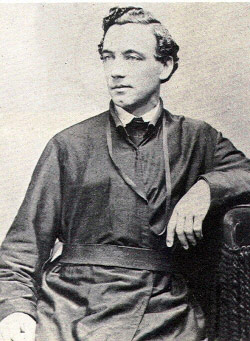
An 1877 portrait of Healy

As slaves under the law, the Healy children were prohibited from attending school. Wishing to remove them from their conditions of slavery in Georgia, Michael Healy sent all of his children to be educated in the North, and at the time of his death in August 1850, he intended to join them. Healy was at first unable to find a school in the North that would accept his children, but eventually found the Flushing Quaker Academy. The school was associated with the Old Quaker Meeting House in Flushing, New York (now a neighborhood of Queens), which enrolled both Black and White students, including the three eldest Healy sons.

Like three of his brothers, Patrick Healy continued his education at the College of the Holy Cross in Worcester, Massachusetts. He graduated in 1850, at the age of 16, and was awarded a Bachelor of Arts by Georgetown University, since Holy Cross had not yet been chartered and conferred degrees under Georgetown's charter. He placed first in his class at the college, as his brother James had before him. Healy and his brothers had been taken under the tutelage of John Bernard Fitzpatrick, the Bishop of Boston. After graduating, Healy entered the Society of Jesus on September 17, 1850, and proceeded to the novitiate in Frederick, Maryland. He worried that his mixed race would present an obstacle to his entrance into the Jesuit order, but this did not prove to be a problem. The fact that Healy's parents were never formally married meant that, under canon law, Healy was born out of wedlock; this required that he obtain a dispensation to join the order, but none was ever sought and he was admitted without issue. With his admission to the Society of Jesus, he became the first Black American Jesuit.

After two years of study, Healy professed his first vows, and was sent to teach at Saint Joseph's College in Philadelphia. In 1853, he was transferred back to the College of the Holy Cross. While teaching there, he found that some students who knew his brothers learned of his racial background and made disparaging comments about him in secret.

In 1858, Healy went to Georgetown University, where he studied philosophy and theology. The Jesuit superiors at Georgetown were impressed by his skill in philosophy and decided to send him to Europe, where he continued his studies. He first went to Rome, but his health declined during the winter, and he transferred to the Saint-Sulpice Seminary in Paris. He eventually went to Belgium to complete his studies at the Catholic University of Louvain. While there, he was ordained a priest on September 3, 1864. He also became fluent in Latin, French, Italian, and German. On July 26, 1865, he received a PhD in philosophy, making him the first Black American ever to earn a PhD.

=== Racial identity ===
"Placed in a college as I am, over boys who were well acquainted either by sight or hearsay with me + my brothers, remarks are sometimes made (though not in my hearing) which wound my very heart. You know to what I refer."

— Patrick Healy, letter to Fr. George Fenwick while teaching at the College of the Holy Cross in Worcester, Massachusetts

Throughout his life, Healy's race was the subject of speculation. According to the one-drop rule, which prevailed during his lifetime, he was considered a "negro" because he had at least one black ancestor. The Healy brothers considered themselves White, rather than Black. Of them all, Patrick Healy most readily passed as White. His passport described his complexion as "light", suggesting he passed as a light-skinned White man, rather than as a light-skinned Black man. Though he himself identified as White, knowledge of his mixed race background would not be a secret while he served as president of Georgetown University. His fellow Jesuits knew of his mixed race, but it is unlikely that this was widely known outside of Jesuit circles.

Despite his appearance and self-identity, there was some speculation about his race in his early life. While decrying racism in the United States in an 1862 article, Orestes Brownson, a Catholic convert who knew the Healy family personally, alluded to the Healy brothers who became priests as belonging to the category of "men with large admixture of negro blood, born of slave mothers." Likewise, while in school, Patrick Healy faced rumors among classmates that his White but slightly dark complexion was due to the presence of some "Spanish blood." Of the three Healy brothers who were priests, only Alexander Sherwood Healy appeared Black.

Though Healy's biracial background was not widely known during his lifetime, there was a resurgent interest in his history in the mid-20th century. In the early 1950s, Jesuit sociologist Albert S. Foley began inquiring into the history of the Healy family, culminating in a 1954 book that described their mixed race. In the 1960s and 1970s, Georgetown University began publicly identifying Healy as Black.

== Georgetown University ==
In 1866, Healy returned to Maryland and was appointed the chair of philosophy at Georgetown University, which was recovering from the damage of the Civil War. In 1867, he professed his final vows. The following year, he became the prefect of schools. Healy was briefly stationed at St. Mary's Church in Alexandria, Virginia. He developed a friendship with Julia Gardiner Tyler, the widow of President John Tyler, and with her conversion to Catholicism, acted as her godfather during her conditional baptism in May 1872.

As early as 1869, there was talk of naming Healy to succeed Bernard A. Maguire, who was in his second term as president of the university. The provincial superior, Joseph Keller, had described Healy as the most qualified candidate, but the superiors in Rome decided on John Early due to Healy's race. When Early became ill, Keller proposed to the superiors in Rome that John Bapst succeed him, while Healy would replace Bapst as the president of Boston College, believing that his race would be less of an issue at the New England school. Rome rejected this arrangement, deciding that Bapst should remain in Boston. As president Early's health began to fail, Healy increasingly assumed the duties of the presidency.

=== Presidency ===
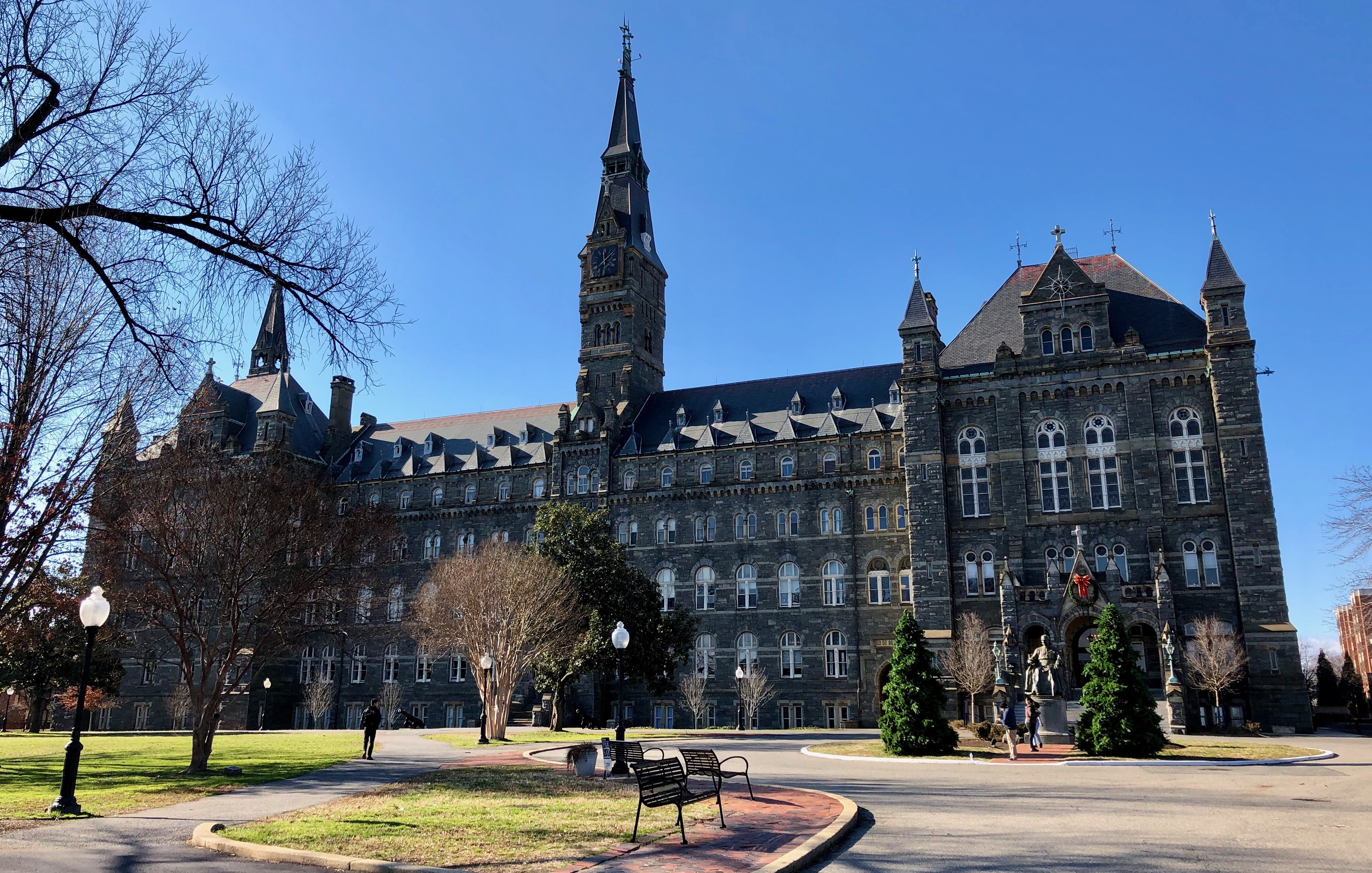
Healy Hall at Georgetown University

On May 23, 1873, Early died suddenly, and Keller made Healy the acting rector. The following day, the board of directors took the further step of electing him the president of Georgetown University. His appointment as rector by the Jesuit Superior General, which ordinarily was done around the same time as the selection of a new president, did not come until a year later; the delay was the result of concern in Rome over Healy's mixed-race background. On July 31, 1874, he was officially inaugurated as president and rector of the university. As such, he became the first Black president of a predominantly White university in the United States. In an atypical arrangement, he continued to hold the role of prefect until 1879, simultaneously with the office of president.

In the year following his inauguration as president, Healy described his goal of transforming Georgetown into a modern "university" to the Superior General, Peter Jan Beckx. While Georgetown already fit the contemporaneous American definition of a university—a collection of degree-granting schools under one administration—Healy sought to remake Georgetown in the newly emerging notion of a university—an institution where a person could learn in any of a wide array of increasingly specialized academic fields. In this way, he sought to realize what the nation's bishops, gathered in 1866 at the Second Plenary Council of Baltimore, had envisioned: a great Catholic university in the United States that engaged in scholarship in every religious and secular subject.

The demographics of the student body underwent change during Healy's tenure, Northerners outnumbering Southerners for the first time. Meanwhile, the percentage of students who were Catholic increased to more than 80%, due in part to a growing Irish American middle class in the North that was able to send its sons to Georgetown. Meanwhile, Healy created the first formal scholarship program that paid the tuition of one student from each of Washington's parishes. He also reformed the university's approach to student discipline, bringing it more closely in line with other contemporary American universities; rather than the university acting in loco parentis, it would treat students as being on the cusp of adulthood.

==== Curricular reform ====
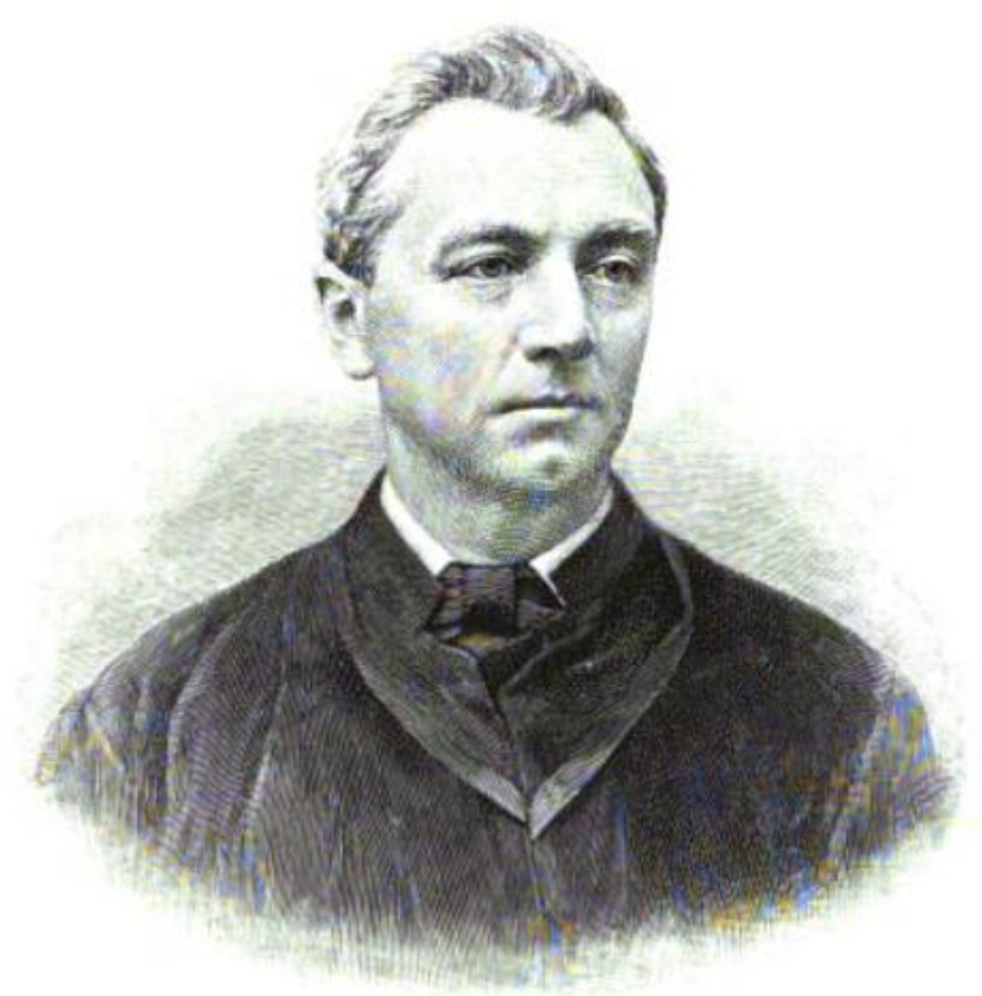
Line drawing of Healy

Healy continued the reform of the curriculum he began as prefect by increasing the breadth of courses offered, and, by 1879, allowing students to study the classical liberal arts curriculum or a new "commercial and scientific" one. Graduates of this new scientific curriculum received a Bachelor of Science degree. Healy recruited new Jesuit faculty with higher academic credentials to support this curricular improvement. Despite the new emphasis on science, Healy revitalized the university's commitment to rhetoric. In 1875, he established the Merrick Debate, hosted by the Philodemic Society, following a donation by alumnus Richard T. Merrick. He also gave the Society a privileged place among student groups by setting aside its own room in Healy Hall. Three graduation medals were created: the Merrick Debating Medal, the Morris Historical Medal, and the Tower Scientific Medal. Healy also discontinued the monastic practice of having one student read aloud in the refectory during meals.

As well as reforming undergraduate science education, Healy sought to bring the School of Medicine up to rigorous, modern medical standards. While the school had previously operated almost entirely autonomously of the rest of the university, Healy dissolved its governing board, bringing the school under his direct control, and replaced the entire faculty (with only the founding faculty remaining as professors emeriti). The length of the curriculum was lengthened from two to three years, which now included clinical education. For the first time, applicants were required to sit for an entrance exam.

During Healy's presidency, the Law School grew, driven in large part by the District of Columbia Bar's decision to require new applicants to the bar to have completed three years of formal legal education. In the early 1880s, the school relocated twice within Downtown Washington, but was financially unable to move to the university's Georgetown campus as it desired.

==== Constructing Healy Hall ====
Healy and Keller met in 1874 and determined that Georgetown's most pressing need was to expand its physical facilities. They entertained the possibility of relocating to a new, nearby campus north of New Cut Road (today known as Reservoir Road), or moving the university out of Washington, D.C. entirely. However, the cost of both of these proposals was prohibitive, and they decided instead to improve the existing campus. Replacing plans for the construction of several smaller buildings, Healy undertook to construct the grand building that he envisioned as prefect in an embellished architectural style that contrasted with the city's simple Federal architecture. It would connect Old North and the Maguire Building.

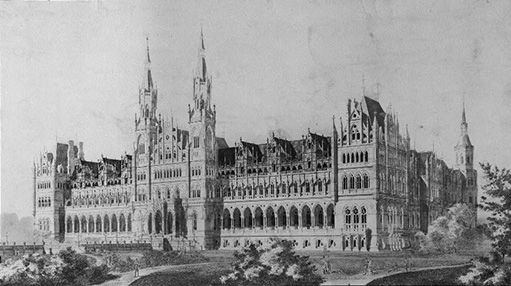
Early architectural rendering of Healy Hall, grander than what would ultimately come to fruition

In 1874, Healy commissioned architects John L. Smithmeyer and Paul J. Pelz to design what would later become known as Healy Hall, Georgetown's flagship building. The building would rise five stories, topped by a 200-foot (61 m) clock tower, and incorporate elements of several architectural styles into a primarily Romanesque facade, evoking the ancient universities of Europe. It would house classrooms, offices, an auditorium (later known as Gaston Hall), laboratories, a library, and students dormitories. Groundbreaking occurred in 1877, after obtaining the reluctant approval of the provincial superior, who was wary of the cost of constructing one large, ornate building, and authorized $100,000 to be spent, equivalent to $3 million in 2025. By far the largest project Georgetown had ever undertaken, construction of the building required the university, which was already suffering from the Panic of 1873, to finance the entire project on debt.

To sustain the project, in 1880, Healy re-established Georgetown's alumni association, which had gone defunct four years earlier. He also solicited William Wilson Corcoran, the university's oldest living alumnus, to become president of the association and to raise funds. Despite the creation of the alumni association and a donation by Corcoran, after several years, only a small fraction of the $100,000 was raised. Therefore, from 1878 to 1880, Healy left the university to travel the country to raise funds. In 1878, he sailed to San Francisco, California, by way of the Isthmus of Panama, with the president of the College of the Holy Cross, Joseph B. O'Hagan. Though also to engage in fundraising, this voyage was primarily intended to improve Healy's declining health. The following year, he returned by land, crossing the Midwest to New York City and down the East Coast. Despite his extensive efforts, Healy was only able to raise $60,000.

Meanwhile, as construction on the building progressed, so did costs. In November 1879, the building's exterior was complete, at a cost of more than $150,000 (~$4.27 million in 2024). After a halt in construction, work began on the interior in 1880, requiring additional, large loans to be taken out. The building was put to regular use in 1881, and by the following year, almost $440,000 had been expended on the project, equivalent to $14.7 million in 2025. Facing a dire financial situation, the university laid off staff, including all its lay faculty, and began leasing and selling properties it owned in Washington, D.C., Virginia, and Pennsylvania.

== Later years ==
Throughout his presidency, Healy experienced poor health, likely a consequence of untreated epilepsy. In 1881, he went to live with his brother, James, in Maine to recover his health. After returning to Georgetown in February 1882, his condition quickly worsened and he resigned the presidency on February 16, being succeeded by James A. Doonan.

After leaving Georgetown, Healy returned to Portland, Maine, to live with his brother. The two traveled extensively throughout Europe, visiting major Catholic institutions in France, Spain, Italy, and Belgium. He was selected to represent the Jesuits of the Northeastern United States as a delegate to the Jesuits' 24th General Congregation, which convened at the Sanctuary of Loyola in Azpeitia, Spain, on September 24, 1892. Despite his travels, Healy's health would never recover. After some time, he went to Providence, Rhode Island, where he performed limited pastoral work. He then returned to New York City, where he was assigned to the Church of St. Ignatius Loyola. Several years later, he moved back to Georgetown University to live out his final years.

Healy died at Georgetown on January 10, 1910. His funeral was held in Dahlgren Chapel, and his body was interred in the Jesuit Community Cemetery on the university's campus. By the time of his death, Healy was frequently referred to as the "second founder" of Georgetown, (Note: The original founder of Georgetown in 1789 was Bishop John Carroll. Giovanni Antonio Grassi has also been referred to as the university's "second founder.") for presiding over a period of unprecedented growth in the university's history.

In 1969, the Georgetown University Alumni Association created the Patrick Healy Award, which is presented annually to an individual who is not an alumnus of the university but has contributed to it and upheld its ideals and traditions. In 1975, Patrick F. Healy Middle School in East Orange, New Jersey opened.

== See also ==
- List of African-American firsts
- Black Catholicism
- History of Georgetown University

== Notes ==
Academic offices
Preceded by John Early	29th President of Georgetown University; 1873—1882	Succeeded by James A. Doonan
