= Michael A. Healy =

U.S. Revenue Cutter Service officer (1839–1904)

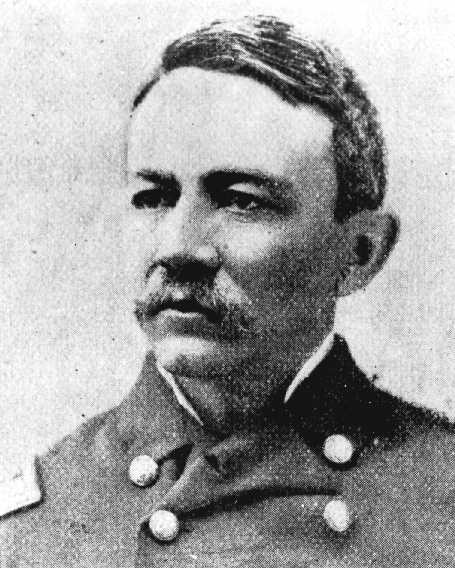
- Born: September 22, 1839; Jones County, Georgia, U.S.
- Died: August 30, 1904 (aged 64); San Francisco, California, U.S.
- Burial place: Colma, California, U.S.
- Education: College of the Holy Cross (AB)
- Military career
- Allegiance: United States
- Branch: U.S. Revenue Cutter Service
- Service years: 1865–1903
- Rank: Captain (USRCS) (Note: The officer rank structure of the Revenue Cutter Service differed from that of the U.S. Navy during the period that Healy served. The rank of an RCS captain was equivalent to a Navy lieutenant commander. After 1894 the rank of senior captain was authorized by Congress but Healy never held that rank; it was equivalent to a Navy commander. In 1908 Congress authorized the rank and title of "Captain-Commandant" which was equivalent to a Navy captain.)
- Nickname: "Hell Roaring Mike"
- Commands: USRC Rush; USRC Corwin; USRC Bear; USRC McCulloch; USRC Thetis

Michael Augustine Healy (September 22, 1839 – August 30, 1904) was an American career officer with the United States Revenue Cutter Service (predecessor of the United States Coast Guard), reaching the rank of captain. He has been recognized since the late 20th century as the first man of African-American descent to command a ship of the United States government.

He commanded several vessels within the territory of the Alaskan coastline.

Following U.S. Secretary of State William H. Seward's Alaska purchase of the vast region in 1867, Healy patrolled the 20,000 miles (32,000 km) of Alaskan coastline for more than 20 years, earning great respect from the natives and seafarers alike. After commercial fishing had depleted the whale and seal populations, his assistance with the introduction of Siberian reindeer helped prevent starvation among the Alaskan Natives. The author Jack London was inspired by Healy's command of the renowned USRC Bear. It had a thick wooden hull, and was powered by steam-and-sail for use as a proto-icebreaker; it was put into service as a cutter in 1884. Nicknamed "Hell Roaring Mike", Healy was the fifth of 10 children of the Healy family of Georgia, known for their achievements in the North after being born into slavery. Their parents were an Irish-born planter and an enslaved woman of mixed race. His father arranged for the children to be formally educated at boarding schools in the North. Predominately European in ancestry, they identified as Irish Catholics. USCGC Healy, commissioned in 1999, was named in his honor.

== Early life and education ==
Healy was born into slavery near Macon, Georgia, in 1839, as the fifth of ten children of Michael Morris Healy, an Irish immigrant planter, and Mary Eliza Smith, an enslaved woman of mixed race. (Note: Some references say Mary Eliza Clark, others say Mary Eliza Smith)

The senior Healy was born in 1795 in Roscommon, Ireland, and immigrated to the U.S. in 1818 as a young man. He eventually acquired 1,500 acres (6.1 km^{2}) of land in Georgia near Macon. He eventually owned 49 slaves as workers for his plantation; among them was 16-year-old Mary Eliza Smith (or Clark), described as an octoroon or a mulatto, whom he took as his wife in 1829. Under the partus principle in slave law, the Healy children were legally slaves because their mother was enslaved. As such they were prohibited formal education in Georgia, and their father sent them north to be schooled, a common practice of wealthy white planters who had mixed-race children.

Though not unusual, the Healys' household violated laws against inter-racial marriage. Healy's wealth and ambition provided for his children's education. Most of the children, all but one surviving infancy, achieved noteworthy success as adults. In the North, the Healy siblings were educated as and identified as Irish Catholics. They were part of a growing ethnic group in the mid-19th century United States. During the late 20th century, their individual professional achievements were claimed as notable firsts for African Americans.

The oldest son, James Augustine Healy, born in 1830, first went to a Quaker school in New York and New Jersey. His father transferred him at age 14 to preparatory classes for the College of the Holy Cross in Worcester, Massachusetts. His three younger brothers soon joined him: Hugh, 12, Patrick Francis Healy, 10, and Alexander Sherwood Healy (known as Sherwood), 8. Michael, then only 6, was not enrolled at Holy Cross until 1849.

All four of the older brothers graduated from Holy Cross. The three eldest entered the priesthood. After attending seminaries in Montreal and Paris, James was ordained a priest at the Cathedral of Notre Dame in 1854. In the 20th century he was claimed as the first African-American priest in the Catholic Church. In 1875, he became the second bishop of the Diocese of Portland, Maine, and is known as the first U.S. Catholic African-American bishop.

Patrick Healy became a Jesuit and was the first African American to earn a PhD; he completed it at Saint-Sulpice Seminary in Paris. At the age of 39, in 1874, he assumed the presidency of Georgetown College, at the time the largest Catholic college in the U.S.

Sherwood Healy was also ordained as a priest, and earned a PhD at Saint-Sulpice. An expert in canon law, he served as director of the seminary in Troy, New York. Later he became rector of the cathedral in Boston. Sherwood was musical and formed the Boston Choral Union, which helped raise funds for a new cathedral. He died at age 39.

The three Healy sisters attended parochial schools in Montreal, Quebec, Canada, ultimately entering Catholic orders. Martha, the oldest, left her convent after several years and moved to Boston, where two brothers were living and working. She married an Irish immigrant and had a son with him. Josephine lived with her family in Boston before joining the Religious Hospitallers of Saint Joseph. Eliza joined the Congregation of Notre Dame of Montreal, where she was known as Sister Mary Magdalen. After teaching in Quebec and Ontario, in 1903 Eliza was appointed abbess or mother superior of the convent and school of Villa Barlow in St. Albans, Vermont. She has become recognized as the first African American to reach this position.

In May 1850, the Healys' mother Mary Eliza died, followed four months later by her husband, Michael Morris Healy. leaving James as the head of the family. He was unable to convince young Michael to follow him into the priesthood. Unhappy and rebellious at Holy Cross, Michael was sent in 1854 to a French seminary. In 1855, he left that school for England, where he signed on as a cabin boy with the Jumna, an American East Indian clipper, eventually serving as an officer on merchant vessels.

== Career ==
=== U.S. Revenue Cutter Service ===
In 1864 during the American Civil War, Healy returned to his family in Boston, where he applied for a commission in the Revenue Cutter Service. He was accepted as a third lieutenant on March 7, 1865, and his commission was signed by President Abraham Lincoln. Healy was the first African American commissioned into the Revenue Cutter Service. He was promoted to second lieutenant on June 6, 1866. (Note: Little is known of Healy's assignments between the time he was commissioned in 1865 and his service aboard Reliance in 1867. His official Coast Guard biography mentions that he served successfully on several unnamed cutters on the East Coast during the period 1865 to 1875. Strobridge and Noble do not have information on the period 1865 to 1867, but do mention service on Reliance, Lincoln, and Active for the period of 1865 to 1875.) Under U.S. Secretary of State William H. Seward, during the administration of President Andrew Johnson, the Alaska purchase was made on March 29, 1867. The huge territory, with 20,000 miles (32,000 km) of coastline, was initially referred to by many skeptics as "Seward's Folly" or "Seward's Ice Box."

The Revenue Cutter Service became the principal government agency for transporting government officials, scientists, and doctors, as well as serving as the principal US law enforcement agency in the Alaska Territory. Healy was assigned to the newly commissioned USRC Reliance when it sailed around Cape Horn and arrived at Sitka, Alaska, on November 24, 1868. The following year he was transferred to USRC Lincoln in San Francisco, California. While serving on Lincoln, he was promoted to first lieutenant on July 21, 1870. On January 8, 1872, he received orders to report aboard USRC Active home-ported in New Bedford, Massachusetts, where he became familiar with the masters of whaling ships. His experience in this period played an important part of his later career in Alaska.

=== "Hell Roaring Mike" ===
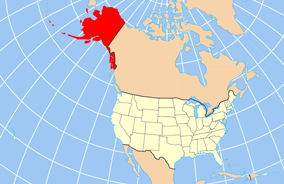
Map showing Alaska's position relative to the 48 lower states

Healy returned to Alaskan waters aboard the newly built USRC Rush in 1875. In 1880, by request of the captain of Corwin, he was transferred to serve as executive officer, but the assignment did not last long. In August 1881 he assumed his first command on Rush. Renowned naturalist John Muir made one voyage with Healy as part of an ambitious government scientific program. Healy was serving as First Officer of USRC Thomas Corwin during the summer of 1881.

By 1882 Healy was given command of Corwin and was already thoroughly familiar with the Bering Sea and Alaska. In this command, he enforced liquor laws, protected seal and whale populations under treaty; delivered supplies, mail and medicines to remote villages; returned deserters to merchant ships, collected weather data, rendered medical assistance, conducted search and rescue, enforced federal laws, and accomplished exploration work. In October 1882 he took part in the Angoon Bombardment, in which the village of Angoon, Alaska was destroyed following hostage taking by the Tlingit.

He attained the rank of captain on March 3, 1883. At this point in his career, Healy had earned a reputation as a person thoroughly familiar with Alaskan waters and as a commander who expected the most from his vessel and crew. He was at the same time known to be a hard drinker, and most of his junior officers found him difficult. He was respected for his efforts to rescue vessels and crews in peril. Healy was often recognized for his humanitarian efforts, including being recognized by Congress for his life-saving work in the Arctic in 1885.

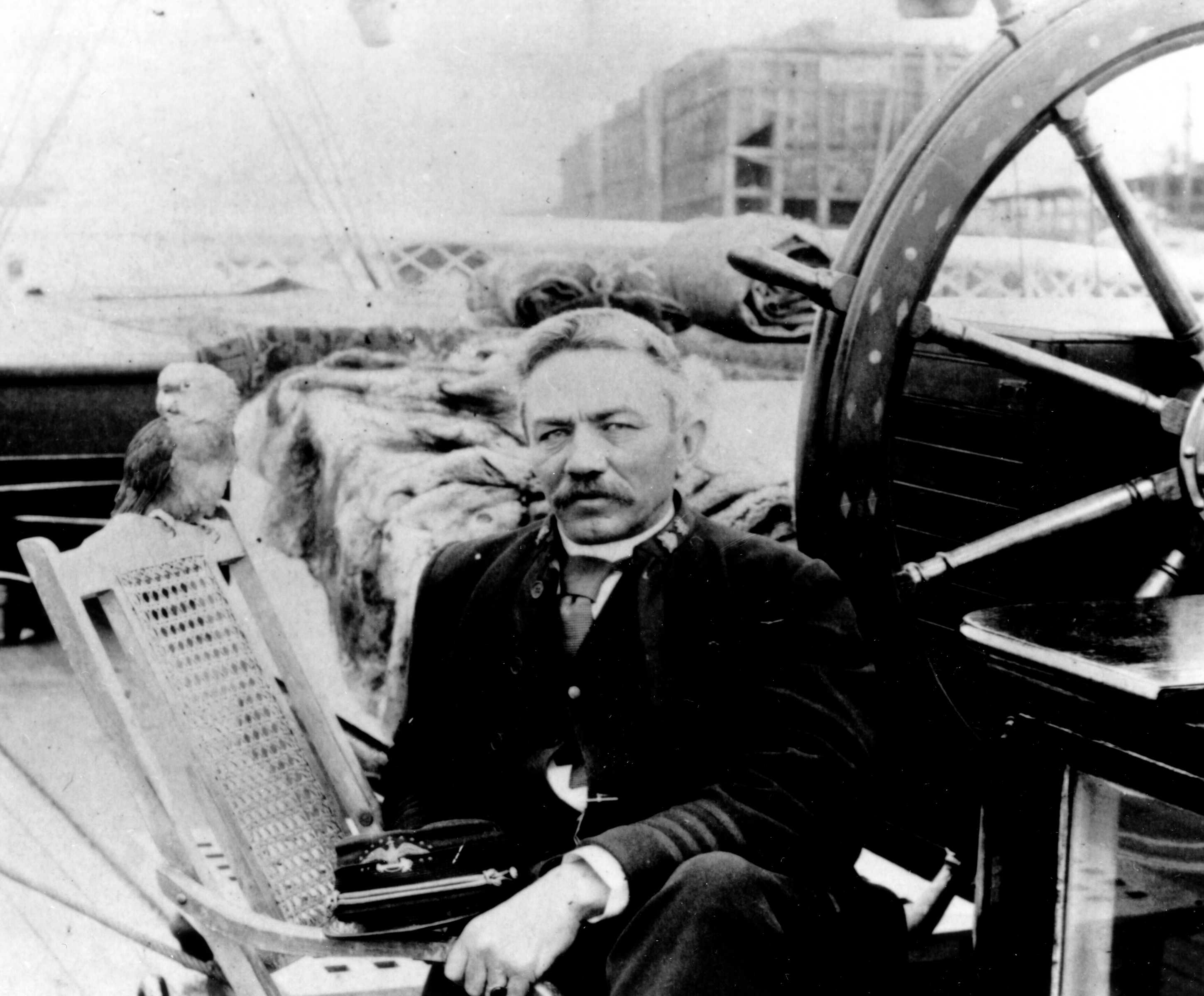
Captain Michael A. Healy on the quarterdeck of the Revenue Cutter Bear

He took command of Bear in 1887. His reputation with the whalers was so well established that when the Woman's Christian Temperance Union and the Seaman's Union requested a board of inquiry to consider charges of drunkenness and cruelty against him, the whaler skippers quickly got the drunkenness charges dismissed. The cruelty charges stemmed from an incident aboard the whaler Estrella in 1889: Healy had a seaman "triced up" to restore order. (Note: Tricing up entailed handcuffing a seaman's hands behind his back, running a short length of line through the irons, and passing the line through a ringbolt high on the bulkhead or mast. The offending seaman would be hoisted up until his toes just touched the deck. (The term comes from the nautical term trice, meaning to haul up or secure).) Healy defended his actions as an effort to quell a mutiny, and the charge was eventually dismissed.

In July 1889, Healy paid a courtesy call to the skipper of USRC Rush, Captain Leonard G. Shepard, in an intoxicated state, a serious breach of naval etiquette. Shortly thereafter, Shepard became the Chief of the Revenue Cutter Bureau and he wrote Healy warning him that if he could not control his drinking, he could face loss of command. Healy replied stating that he "pledge[d] to you by all I hold most sacred that while I live never to touch intoxicants of any kind or description....One thing I will hate and that is to give up my command of the Bear. I love the ship, tho [it is] hard work."

During the last two decades of the 19th century, Healy was essentially the federal government's law enforcement presence in the vast territory. In his twenty years of service between San Francisco and Point Barrow, he acted as judge, doctor, and policeman to Alaskan natives, merchant seamen and whaling crews. The Native Americans and Alaskan Natives throughout the vast regions of the north came to know and respect him and called his ship "Healy's Fire Canoe." During visits to Siberia, across the Bering Sea from the Alaskan coast, Healy observed that the Chukchi people had domesticated caribou (reindeer), and used them for food, travel, and clothing. He had noted the reduction in the seal and whale populations in Alaska from commercial fishing activities. To compensate for this and aid in transportation, working with Reverend Sheldon Jackson, a Presbyterian missionary and political leader in the territory, Healy helped introduce reindeer from Siberia to Alaska as a source of food, clothing and other necessities for the Native peoples. This work was noted in the New York Sun newspaper in 1894. Healy's compassion for the native population was expressed in many deeds and in his standing order: "Never make a promise to a native you do not intend to keep to the letter."

== Later life and death ==
Healy retired in 1903 at the mandatory retirement age of 64. He died on August 30, 1904, in San Francisco, of a heart attack. He was buried in Colma, California. At the time, his African-American ancestry was not generally known; he was of majority-white ancestry and had identified with white Catholic and maritime communities.

== Personal life ==
In 1865, Healy married Mary Jane Roach, the daughter of Irish immigrants. She was a supportive wife who traveled with her husband. Despite 18 pregnancies, she had only one child who survived, a son named Frederick who was born in 1870. He established his life in northern California, married and had a family.

== Legacy ==
Over a century later, Healy's Coast Guard successors conduct missions reminiscent of his groundbreaking work: protecting the natural resources of the region, suppressing illegal trade, resupply of remote outposts, enforcement of the law, and search and rescue. Even in the early days of Arctic operations, science was an important part of the mission. Healy is now known as the first African-American to command a ship of the United States government. Commissioned in 1999, the research icebreaker USCGC Healy was named in his honor.

To commemorate the entire family's achievements, the former site in Jones County, Georgia of the Healy plantation is called Healy Point. The area is the location of the Healy Point Country Club.

== Notes ==
Footnotes

Citations

References cited

- "Captain Michael A. Healy". Icebreaker Science Operations. U.S. Coast Guard.
- "CGC Healy History" (asp). USCGC HEALY (WAGB-20). U.S. Coast Guard.
- "Healy, Bishop James Augustine (1830-1900)". Online Encyclopedia. BlackPast.org website. March 3, 2007.
- "Healy, Eliza [Sister Mary Magdalen] (1846–1918)". Online Encyclopedia. BlackPast.org website. May 31, 2008.
- "Healy, Patrick (1834-1910)". Online Encyclopedia. BlackPast.org website. March 3, 2007.
- "James Augustine Healy, the Children's Priest". The Registry. African-American Registry website. Archived from the original on March 22, 2014.
- Cutler, Deborah W. and Thomas J. Cutler (2005). Dictionary of Naval Terms. Naval Institute Press, Annapolis, Maryland. ISBN 978-1-59114-150-1.
- King, Irving H. (1996). The Coast Guard Expands, 1865–1915: New Roles, New Frontiers. Naval Institute Press, Annapolis, Maryland. ISBN 978-1-55750-458-6.
- Noble (1990), Dennis L. "Historical Register U.S. Revenue Cutter Service Officers, 1790–1914" (PDF). Coast Guard Personnel. U.S. Coast Guard Historian's Office.
- O'Dell, James. "Captain "Hell Roaring" Michael A. Healy, U.S.R.C.S." Notable People. U.S. Coast Guard Historian's Office.
- O'Toole, James M. "Passing Free". Boston College Magazine, Summer 2003. Boston College website. Archived from the original on July 22, 2011.
- Strobridge, Truman R. and Dennis L. Noble (1999). Alaska and the U.S. Revenue Cutter Service, 1867–1915. Naval Institute Press, Annapolis, Maryland. ISBN 978-1-55750-845-4.
