= James Augustine Healy =

American Catholic bishop (1830–1900)

His Excellency, The Right Reverend James Augustine Healy
- Bishop of Portland
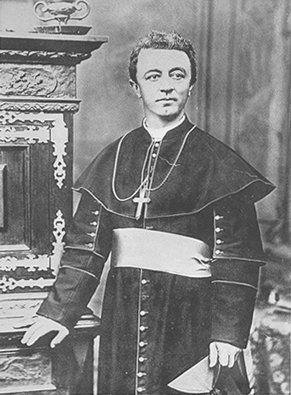
- Church: Catholic Church
- Diocese: Diocese of Portland
- Appointed: February 12, 1875
- Term ended: August 5, 1900 (his death)
- Predecessor: David William Bacon
- Successor: William Henry O'Connell

Orders
- Ordination: June 10, 1854 by Marie-Dominique-Auguste Sibour
- Consecration: June 2, 1875 by John Joseph Williams

Personal details
- Born: April 6, 1830 Jones County, Georgia, U.S.
- Died: August 5, 1900 (aged 70) Portland, Maine, U.S.
- Education: College of the Holy Cross; Saint-Sulpice Seminary; Sulpican Seminary
- Motto: Immaculata (Immaculate)
- Signature: James Augustine Healy's signature

James Augustine Healy (April 6, 1830 – August 5, 1900) was an American prelate of the Catholic Church. He was the first known man of African American ancestry to serve as a Catholic priest or bishop. With his predominantly European ancestry, Healy passed for a white man and identified as such.

Born into slavery in the Healy family of Georgia, James Healy was the son of a White plantation owner and a mixed-race enslaved woman. He was later freed, educated overseas, and ordained a priest in 1854. He served as bishop of Portland in Maine from 1875 until his death in 1900.

== Early life and family ==
James Healy was born in Jones County, Georgia, on April 6, 1830. His father, Michael Morris Healy (1796–1850), was a native of County Roscommon, Ireland who became a wealthy cotton planter after settling in Georgia. Healy owned more than 1,500 acres of land near the Ocmulgee River as well as 49 to 60 enslaved people. James's mother was a mixed-race enslaved woman named Mary Eliza (c. 1813–1850), whom Michael had purchased for $3,700 along with her family.

James was the eldest of their ten children. His siblings were:

- Hugh Clark Healy (1832–1853)
- Patrick Francis Healy (1834–1910), the first African American Jesuit and president of Georgetown University in Washington, D.C.
- Alexander Sherwood Healy (1836–1875), a priest and rector of the Cathedral of the Holy Cross in Boston
- Martha Ann Healy (1838–1920)
- Michael Augustine Healy (1839–1904), a captain in the U.S. Revenue Cutter Service and the first African American to command a ship of the U.S. government
- Eugene Healy (1842), who died in infancy
- Amanda Josephine Healy (1845–1879), a member of the Religious Hospitallers of St. Joseph
- Eliza Dunamore Healy (1846–1919), a member of the Congregation of Notre Dame of Montreal and the first African American abbess
- Eugene Healy (1849–1914)

In his will, Michael Healy referred to Mary Eliza as "my trusty woman, Eliza, mother of my...children." Due to the partus sequitur ventrem principle in slave law, children inherited the legal status of their mothers; therefore, the Healy children were born into slavery. Michael was unable to directly free Mary Eliza and the children as manumission required an act of the Georgia General Assembly in exceptional circumstances. Before their deaths a few months apart in 1850, Michael and Eliza Healy had planned to relocate with their youngest children to a northern state that prohibited slavery.

In February 2024, Washington Post writer Bryan Greene established through DNA evidence that the Healy siblings were blood relatives of abolitionist Ellen Craft, likely first cousins based on historical accounts. DNA test results showed that a descendant of Martha Healy was the 4th to 8th cousin of three of Crafts' descendants. In 1848, Craft escaped slavery in Macon, Georgia, not far from the Healys' birthplace, disguising herself as a white man traveling with her enslaved attendant, her actual husband. According to Greene's article, S.T. Pickard, the editor of the Portland Transcript, stated in 1893 that Ellen Craft told him that she was the first cousin of Bishop Healy. The 2024 DNA results suggest this 131-year old claim was true.

=== Racial identity ===
Due to their largely European ancestry, the Healy children were light-skinned enough to pass for White and they did not publicize their Black heritage. James and his siblings were recorded as White in official documents, such as census records and death certificates. In later years, James discouraged biographies and variously described his mother as the daughter of an aristocratic Virginia family or having come from Santo Domingo in the Dominican Republic. However, their mixed race was known to some; writing to Archbishop John Hughes in 1859, Bishop John Bernard Fitzpatrick mentioned that James' brother Sherwood Healy "has African blood and it shews [sic] distinctly in his exterior."

Some three decades after the last of the Healy children died, Jesuit sociologist Albert S. Foley published a book in 1954 that detailed their biracial background.

=== Education ===
As enslaved people under Georgia law, the Healy children were prohibited from attending school. In 1837, at age seven, Michael Healy took James to New York City and enrolled him at a Quaker school in Flushing that was associated with the Old Quaker Meeting House. James continued his education at another Quaker school in Burlington, New Jersey, where he excelled in mathematics and apprenticed to a surveyor. After Michael Healy became acquainted with Bishop John Fitzpatrick of Boston, he sent his son to the College of the Holy Cross, a newly founded Jesuit school in Worcester, Massachusetts.

James Healy entered Holy Cross in August 1844 and would later recount in his diary, "Today, 5 years ago I entered this college. What a change. Then I was nothing, now I am a Catholic." He and his brothers Hugh, Patrick, and Sherwood were baptized at Holy Cross in November 1844, alongside the sons of Catholic convert Orestes Brownson. James spent his school vacations with the families of local priests in Boston and Cambridge, Massachusetts. He was named valedictorian of the first graduating class at Holy Cross in 1849.Following his graduation from Holy Cross, Healy decided to enter the priesthood and was accepted into Saint-Sulpice Seminary in Montreal, Quebec. After three years in Canada, he went to France in 1852 to complete his theological studies at the Sulpician Seminary in Paris.

== Priesthood ==
Healy was ordained a priest for the Diocese of Boston in Paris on June 10, 1854 at Notre-Dame Cathedral by Archbishop Marie-Dominique-Auguste Sibour. Healy thus became the first known African American to join the Catholic priesthood; however, Reverend Augustus Tolton, who was born in 1854, would become the first Catholic priest "publicly known to be black" when he was ordained in 1886.

Healy returned to Boston in August 1854. Knowing there were rumors about his racial heritage in Boston, he expressed his apprehension about serving there to a confidante: "The mercy of God has placed a poor outcast on a throne of glory that ill becomes him. If I could have been as safe elsewhere as here, I should have desired never to show my face in Boston." The diocese assigned Healy as an assistant pastor at St. John's Parish in the North End and at the House of the Angel Guardian in Boston for homeless boys. This was followed by appointments as personal secretary to Bishop Fitzpatrick (December 1854) and chancellor of the diocese (June 1855), which gave him a significant role in diocesan affairs. Healy also served as rector of Holy Cross Cathedral (1862 to 1866).

During the American Civil War, Healy supported the Union. However, he was opposed to the Radical Republicans' plans for Reconstruction in the southern states, believing it would lead to "the super-elevation of the negro." In 1865, he helped establish the Home for Destitute Catholic Children in Boston to care for children who had been left fatherless or totally orphaned by the war.

In March 1866, the new Bishop John Williams named Healy as pastor of St. James Parish, the largest Catholic congregation in Boston. In that position, he helped found the House of the Good Shepherd for homeless girls in Boston and successfully lobbied against legislation in the Massachusetts General Court to tax Catholic churches. As both rector of the cathedral and pastor of St. James, Healy was succeeded by his brother Sherwood.

== Bishop of Portland ==
On February 12, 1875, Healy was appointed the second bishop of Portland by Pope Pius IX. He received his episcopal consecration on June 2, 1875, from Williams, with Bishop Francis McNeirny and Bishop Patrick O'Reilly serving as co-consecrators, at the Cathedral of the Immaculate Conception in Portland, Maine. As such, he was the first Catholic bishop of African ancestry in the United States. It would be 90 years before Bishop Harold Perry became the first publicly recognized individual to hold that distinction.

At the time of Healy's appointment, the diocese encompassed the entire states of Maine and New Hampshire. At the beginning of his tenure in 1875, the diocese contained 52 priests and 58 churches to serve a Catholic population of 80,000. By the time of his death in 1900, there were 92 priests, 86 churches, and 96,400 Catholics. The growth of his diocese was extensive enough that Healy supervised the founding of the Diocese of Manchester when it was split from the Diocese of Portland in 1885.

Early into his tenure as bishop, Healy became involved in a controversy with one of his priests, Reverend Jean Ponsardin of Biddeford, Maine. Healy suspected that Ponsardin had been stealing money that the diocese gave his parish to build a new church. After four years of construction, the building only had a basement and unfinished exterior walls. Healy refused to give Ponsardin any more money and suspended him from ministry in October 1877. Ponsardin then appealed the suspension to Rome, which created gossip among Vatican officials. Healy finally agreed to pay Ponsardin's debts on the condition that he leave the diocese. The Ponsardin matter caused such embarrassment for Healy that he submitted his resignation to Pope Leo XIII in 1878, but the pope rejected it.

Healy was one of the Catholic Church's most vocal opponents of the Knights of Labor, a national labor union. He viewed the organization as a secret society and was the only Catholic bishop in America who threatened to excommunicate any Catholic who joined its ranks. However, Healy withdrew his prohibition after Leo XIII issued Rerum novarum in 1891 and endorsed the right of workers to form labor unions.

Healy participated in the third Plenary Council of Baltimore from November to December 1884, and was appointed to serve on the Commission for the Catholic Missions among the Colored People and the Indians. However, he consistently refused the invitations of the Colored Catholic Congress, saying, "We are of that Church where there is neither...barbarian nor Scythian, slave nor freeman, but Christ is all and in all." Healy celebrated his silver jubilee as a bishop in June 1900 and was given the honorary title of assistant to the papal throne by Leo XIII on that occasion.

== Death and legacy ==
James Healy died in Portland on August 5, 1900, at age 70. He is buried at Calvary Cemetery in South Portland, Maine, where a Celtic cross honoring his Irish heritage marks his grave.

- Healy's papers are held by the College of the Holy Cross, the archives of the Archdiocese of Boston and the archives of the Diocese of Portland.
- The Archdiocese of Boston, Office for Black Catholics, has designated the Bishop James Augustine Healy Award to honor dedicated black parishioners.
- In 1975, Archbishop Thomas A. Donnellan and Bishop Raymond Lessard donated a bronze plaque to be dedicated in Jones County, Georgia, commemorating Healy.
- The Healey Asylum in Lewiston, Maine, was named in his honor.

== See also ==
- Irish diaspora
- Miscegenation
- Timeline of African-American firsts

== Sources ==
- Catholic-Hierarchy.org. Bishop James Augustine Healy
- James Healy
