= Mary Magdalen Healy =

American Roman Catholic religious sister (1846–1919)

Eliza Healy CND
- Born: December 23, 1846; Macon, Georgia, U.S.
- Died: September 13, 1919 (aged 72); Montreal, Quebec, Canada
- Occupations: Mother superior, educator
- Relatives: Healy family

Mary Magdalen Healy, CND (born Eliza Healy; December 23, 1846 – September 13, 1919) was an American Catholic religious sister who served in the Congregation of Notre Dame of Montreal.

Healy was born into the notable Healy family of Macon, Georgia; her father was a white Irish planter and her mother was an enslaved African-American woman of mixed race. The Healy children were reared in Irish-American culture; the girls were educated at French-language schools in Quebec. Mary Magdalen Healy joined religious life and became one of the earliest African-American mother superiors. She led communities in St. Albans, Vermont, and Staten Island, New York.

== Biography ==
=== Early life and family ===
Born in 1846 in Macon, Georgia, Eliza Healy was the youngest daughter of Michael Morris Healy, an Irish immigrant and successful planter, and Mary Eliza Clarke, a much younger enslaved biracial woman.

Born in County Roscommon, Ireland, Michael Morris Healy traveled to Canada as a member of the British army. After his service, he migrated to Jones County, Georgia, near Macon, where he acquired a large amount of property and developed a cotton plantation. The couple lived together from 1829 until their deaths in a cholera epidemic in 1850. They raised their ten children, nine of whom survived to adulthood.

Due to the partus sequitur ventrem principle, Eliza and her siblings – James, Hugh, Patrick, Sherwood (Alexander), Michael, Martha, Josephine (Amanda) and Eugene – were legally considered slaves, as their mother was enslaved. Their father was a free white man and they had three-fourths white ancestry. Georgia state law at the time prohibited slaves from receiving an education and prohibited manumission. When the children were old enough, their father sent them to the North in order to give them an education and higher quality of life.

He and their mother intended to move north with the younger children, but they both died in 1850 before that could take place. By then Eliza's five older brothers and one older sister were already living in the North. Their older brother Hugh risked his freedom to return to the South to rescue the three youngest Healy children, including Eliza. Passing as white, he took them to New York City, where he lived. According to the Fugitive Slave Law of 1850, he was at risk himself for being captured as a slave and taken to the South for sale.

==== Early religious experience and education ====
Even though Michael Healy was Catholic, his children were not baptized. Eliza and her two younger siblings, Josephine (Amanda) and Eugene, were baptized Catholic in New York in 1851, after their brother brought them from the South. Eliza and Josephine both attended schools operated by the Congregation of Notre Dame in Saint-Jean-sur-Richelieu and in Montreal, Quebec. Eliza and Josephine joined their siblings in Boston, Massachusetts, when Eliza finished her secondary education in 1861.

Eliza lived for a time with her brother Eugene in Boston, and then moved to Newton, Massachusetts, to live with her brother James, who had been ordained to priesthood. He would go on to become the first African-American bishop in the United States. Eliza traveled with James to Europe and the Middle East in 1868. She continued living in the West Newton family home until 1874. In the wake of the Panic of 1873, which destroyed much of James' financial resources, Eliza made the decision to enter religious life.

=== Religious life ===
On May 1, 1874, at the age of 27, Eliza entered the novitiate of the Congregation of Notre Dame of Montreal, Canada, and, in December of that same year, received the religious habit and her religious name Mary Magdalen. She pronounced her first vows on July 19, 1876, at twenty-nine years of age, and made her perpetual vows six years later.

Despite some racial discrimination in that era, the fact that she was a woman of color was not a hindrance to her admission by Mother Saint-Victor and her council, as she and her siblings were accepted as Irish-American Catholic. Some twenty years earlier, Eliza's older sister, Martha Ann, was largely educated in Quebec. She also entered the Congregation of Notre Dame, taking the name Sainte-Lucie; she served there from 1855 to 1863. Martha Ann requested and received a dispensation from her vows. She left the convent and later married a man from Ireland; they lived in Boston.

Healy began teaching at the Saint-Patrick Academy in Montreal. Two years later, in 1878, she was among the three sisters who opened the CND mission in Brockville, Ontario. She also taught at Sherbrooke, Quebec (1881–86), and at St. Anthony's in Montreal (1886–88, 1890–94).

After a year as assistant superior in Ottawa, she was appointed superior of a convent in Huntingdon, Quebec (1895–97). The congregation was struggling with debt and financial instability. Healy's strong administrative skills enabled her to return the convent to solvency.

From 1897–98, she served as the superior at the St. Denis Academy. The two following years she was dean of English studies at the congregation's sixth motherhouse in Montreal, and, from 1900–03, she taught at the École Normale Jacques-Cartier, section pour filles (also in Montreal).

From 1903–18, Healy was Mother superior and headmistress of Villa Barlow in St. Albans, Vermont. Though it is claimed she was the first African-American woman to be appointed a Mother superior, she is predated by at least two such women, Servant of God Mary Elizabeth Lange of the Oblate Sisters of Providence in Baltimore, Maryland, and Venerable Mother Henriette DeLille of the Sisters of the Holy Family in New Orleans, Louisiana.

Villa Barlow was a prestigious girls school operated by the CND, which had a mission in St. Albans. Many of its students came from wealthy New England families. But it had fallen into disarray and was burdened with debt. Over her fifteen years in leadership, Healy reorganized the school and its community, and restored a high level of academic and administrative excellence. It was a challenging task. She "had to struggle against the parish and even the diocesan authorities. Her wisdom enabled her to unravel the complicated problems, to assure the resources, to pay the debts, and to make this ... mission one of our most prosperous houses in the United States". She also managed the health and hygiene practices of the religious sisters and pupils in her charge.

In 1918, her fifteen years as superior came to an end when the new Code of Canon Law set limits to terms for some offices of religious superiors. Healy accepted a new challenge as superior of Notre Dame Academy, Staten Island, New York. In a short time, she improved the academy's financial situation.

=== Illness and death ===
After eight months, for health reasons, she had to leave this position and returned to the motherhouse in Montreal. She died on September 13, 1919, from heart disease. Her funeral was held at the motherhouse on September 19, 1919.

== Legacy ==
Chronicles written by Mary Magdalen's community members described her as having business and organizational acumen, an optimistic disposition, and high expectations for the congregation. They particularly noted her leadership skills and devotion to prayer. They described her as:

"so attractive, so upright! ... She reserved the heaviest tasks for herself ... in the kitchen, in the garden in the housework ... She listened to everyone ... was equal to everything ... spared herself nothing ... so that nothing was lacking to make the family (of the community) perfect."
