= Chubbtown, Georgia =

- Unincorporated community
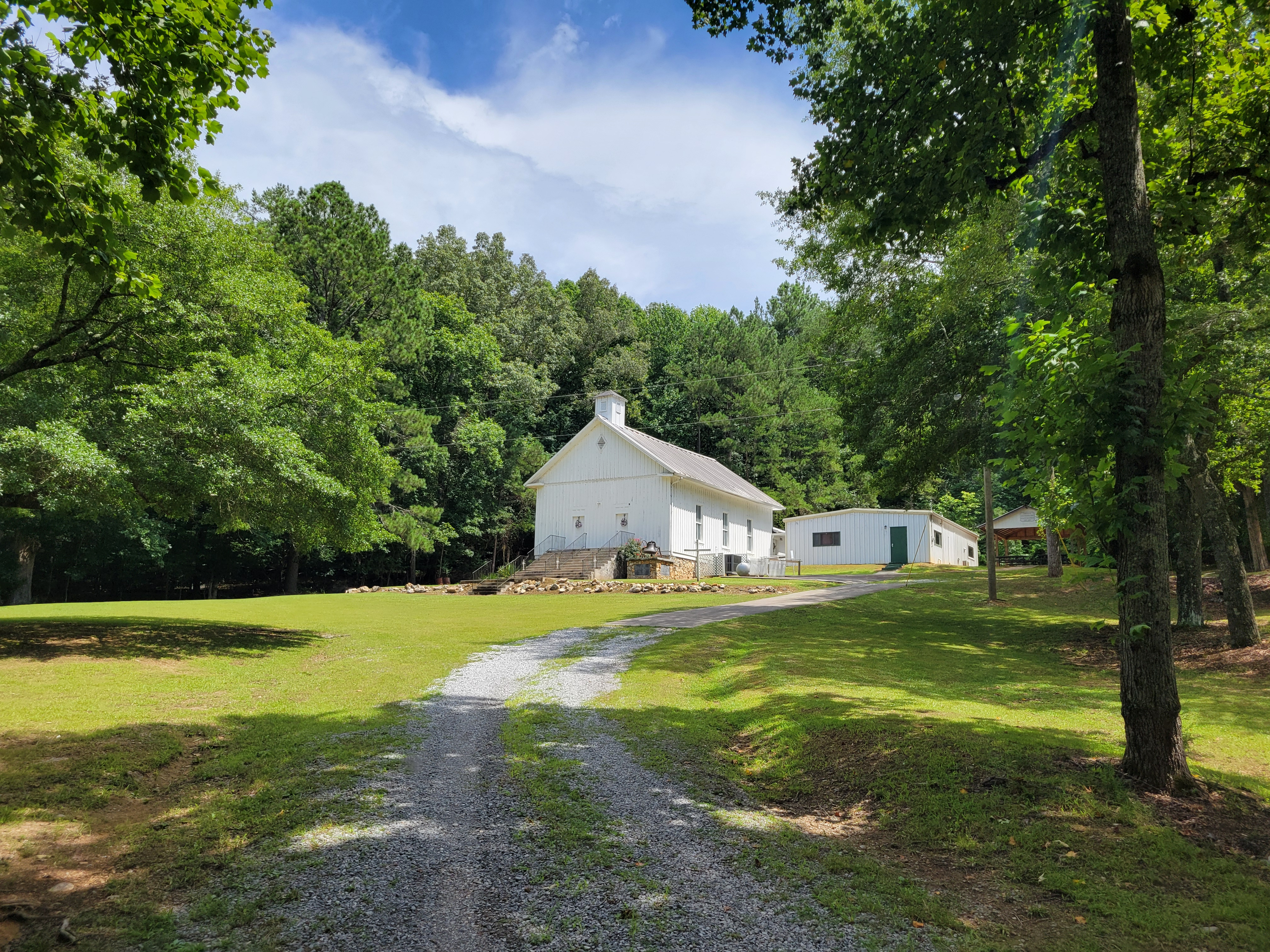
- Chubb Chapel United Methodist Church

- Location within Georgia Location within the United States
- Coordinates: 34°05′25″N 85°16′57″W
- Country: United States
- State: Georgia
- County: Floyd
- Time zone: UTC-5 (Eastern (EST))
  - Summer (DST): UTC-4 (EDT)
- ZIP code: 30124
- Area code: 706
- GNIS feature ID: 355164

Chubbtown is an unincorporated community in Floyd County, Georgia, United States.

== History ==
Chubbtown was founded as a colony of free African-Americans in 1864 by Henry Chubb. Chubbtown provided goods and services to white and black residents of the surrounding areas.

Chubbtown was originally composed of a general store, blacksmith shop, grist mill, distillery, syrup mill, saw mill, wagon company, cotton gin, casket (coffin) company and several farms, all owned and operated by the Chubb family. Later, the community also had its own post office.

=== Chubb family ===
Recorded history of the Chubb family in North America dates back to 1775. Nicholas Chubb, the oldest known ancestor, is listed as a free colored male, head of a household on the 1820 census of Caswell County, North Carolina. While the 1860 Census does not reflect the exact whereabouts of the Chubb family, it would appear that they were already in Floyd County, Georgia. In an undated deed recorded on August 8, 1870, “Henry Chubb and brothers, of town of Cave Spring” conveyed for $200 approximately one acre of land “at Chubbs” to the Trustees of the Methodist Episcopal Church, with “a house now situated on said lot and occupied as a school and a place of religious worship by the colored people.” Henry Chubb, was one of the original trustees of what became Chubb Chapel United Methodist Church. During the Post-Reconstruction period the Chubb brothers continued purchasing real estate to become the self-sufficient community known as Chubbtown. The Chubb family remained and prospered in Floyd County, Georgia, while many southern Black migrants were seeking prosperity in the north.

=== After the Civil War ===
The town was spared destruction by the Union Army during the Civil War.

The family's prosperity declined after 1916 when a devastating flood destroyed many of the businesses.

Bradley Chubb, an outside linebacker, and Nick Chubb, a running back, descendants of the Chubb family, were selected in the 2018 NFL draft by the Denver Broncos and Cleveland Browns, respectively. Bradley played college football at North Carolina State University, while Nick played at the University of Georgia.

The Chubb Methodist Episcopal Church is listed on the National Register of Historic Places.

== See also ==
- Healy family
