= Joseph B. O'Hagan =

Irish-American Jesuit (1826–1878)

The Reverend Joseph B. O'Hagan SJ
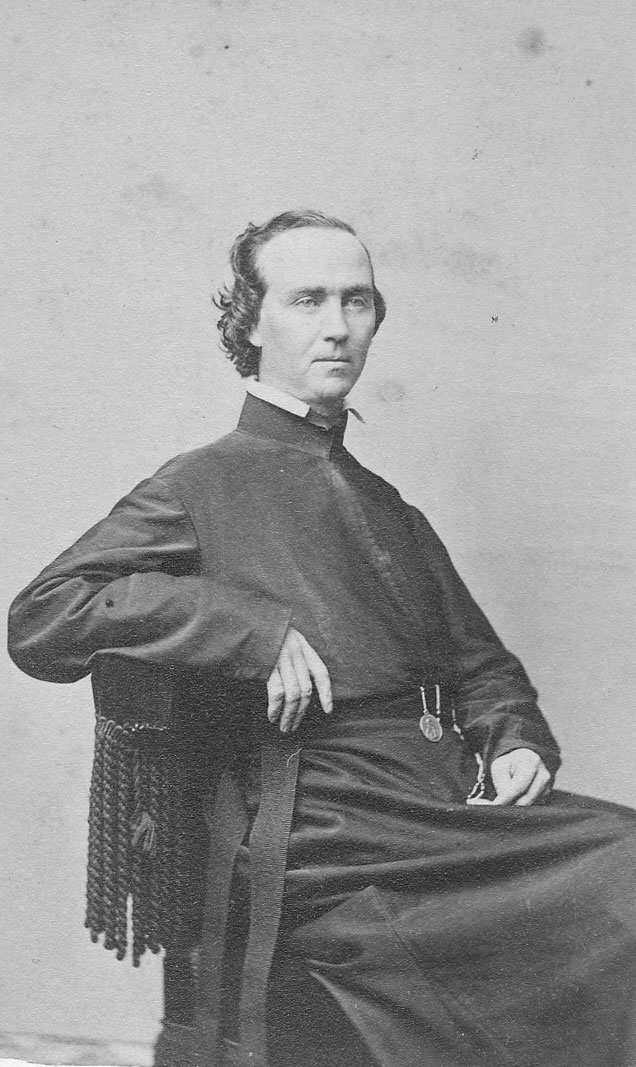

10th President of the College of the Holy Cross
- In office 1873–1878
- Preceded by: Anthony F. Ciampi
- Succeeded by: Edward D. Boone

Personal details
- Born: August 15, 1826 Clogher, County Tyrone, Ireland
- Died: December 15, 1878 (aged 52) Off the Pacific coast of Nicaragua
- Resting place: College of the Holy Cross Cemetery
- Education: Georgetown University; Catholic University of Louvain

Orders
- Ordination: 1861

Joseph B. O'Hagan SJ (August 15, 1826 – December 15, 1878) was an Irish-American Catholic priest and Jesuit who was the president of the College of the Holy Cross from 1873 to 1878. Born in Ireland, he emigrated to Nova Scotia, Canada, at a young age and entered the seminary. While in Boston, Massachusetts, he decided to enter the Society of Jesus. He studied at Georgetown University and the Catholic University of Louvain before returning to the United States and becoming a chaplain in the Union Army during the Civil War.

After the end of the war, he engaged in pastoral work in Boston before becoming president of the College of the Holy Cross. He fell ill in 1878 and sailed for California to recuperate. While at sea, he died off the Pacific coast of Nicaragua.

== Early life ==
Joseph B. O'Hagan was born on August 15, 1826, in Clogher, County Tyrone, Ireland. In his youth, he emigrated to Nova Scotia, Canada, to join his brother. He completed his schooling there before entering the seminary in the Diocese of Halifax, where he befriended Archbishop William Walsh. In the summer of 1847, he was in Boston, Massachusetts, where he met John McElroy and decided to enter the Society of Jesus. He entered the Jesuit novitiate in December of that year, and studied rhetoric and philosophy at Saint John's College in Maryland.

In 1852, O'Hagan became a teacher at the Washington Seminary in Washington, D.C. After three years, he left the seminary to teach at Georgetown University. In 1857, he began his theological studies at Georgetown and two years later, was sent to continue his higher studies in Belgium. He continued his theological education at the Catholic University of Louvain and was ordained a priest there in 1861.

== Civil War chaplaincy ==
O'Hagan returned to the United States just before the outbreak of the Civil War. The provincial superior of the Jesuit Maryland Province, Angelo M. Paresce, appointed him as a chaplain in the Union Army. He was assigned to the Excelsior Brigade, under the command of Major General Daniel Sickles, just after the unit arrived in Washington, D.C., in July 1861. While at first O'Hagan viewed the soldiers as lacking moral character, as some had joined the army as a condition of their release from prison on Blackwell's Island in New York City, his opinion of them changed by the end of his first year as chaplain. He had a small chapel built and prepared many of the men for their First Communion and Confession.

When the Excelsior Brigade became a part of Major General Joseph Hooker's command in the fall of 1861, O'Hagan was made chaplain to the 73rd New York Infantry Regiment. During this time, he became good friends with the unit's Protestant chaplain, Joseph Twichell. He was briefly captured by the Confederate Army during the Peninsula campaign but was soon released and returned to his regiment. O'Hagan remained as an army chaplain until September 1863, when he was directed to finish his Jesuit formation in Frederick, Maryland. He was then at Georgetown when he was sent back to the Union Army during the academic year of 1864–1865 for the final year of the war. He marched with the army during its capture of Richmond, Virginia, and during the Battle of Appomattox Court House.

== Pastoral work ==
For the next 8 years, O'Hagan worked at various churches in Boston, primarily St. Mary's and the Immaculate Conception Churches. In July 1872, he was named to succeed Anthony F. Ciampi as the president of the College of the Holy Cross, and assumed office in 1873.

In the spring of 1878, O'Hagan's health began to decline and his physicians recommended that he recuperate by spending the winter months in the warm weather of San Francisco, California. Accordingly, he resigned the presidency and was succeeded by Edward D. Boone. He traveled to New York City and on November 30 of that year, he set sail for California. He was accompanied by the president of Georgetown University, Patrick Francis Healy. After passing over the Isthmus of Panama, he boarded the steamer Granada. His condition quickly worsened and he began showing signs of apoplexy. On December 15, 1878, he died off the Pacific coast of Nicaragua, at approximately 10°29′N 86°46′W.

O'Hagan was initially buried on December 19 in Acapulco, Mexico. At the request of the Maryland provincial superior, his body was eventually disinterred in 1879 and taken to San Francisco and then overland to Worcester, Massachusetts, where it was reinterred in the Holy Cross college cemetery.

Academic offices
Preceded by Anthony F. Ciampi	10th President of the College of the Holy Cross; 1873–1878	Succeeded by Edward D. Boone
