= Ancien séminaire Saint-Sulpice =

Building in Paris, France (1838-)

- Ancien séminaire Saint-Sulpice
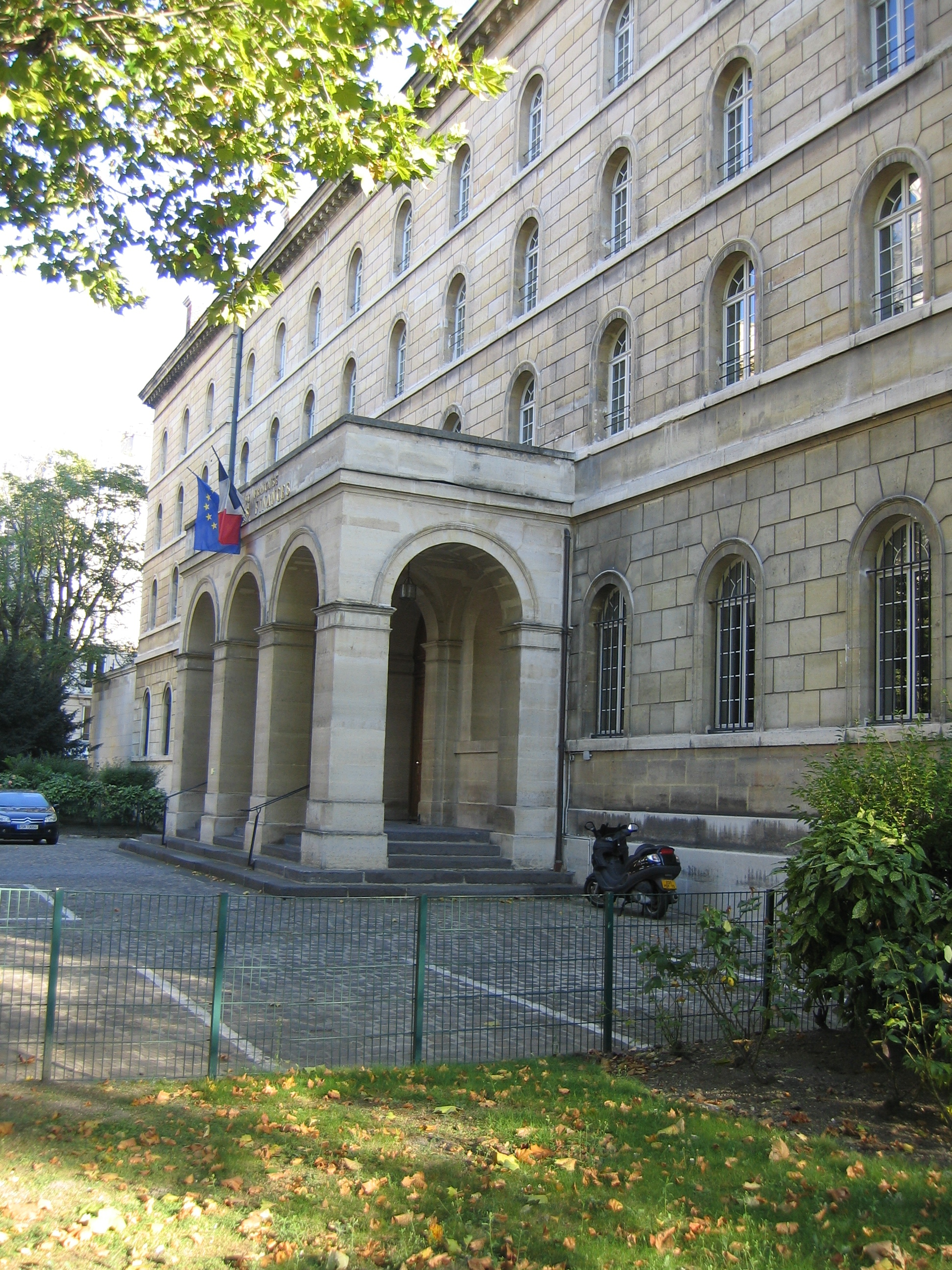
- Location: Place Saint-Sulpice, 6th arrondissement of Paris, France
- Coordinates: 48.850109680001026°N 2.3333667068894868°E
- Beginning date: November 21, 1820
- Completion date: 1838

The ancien séminaire Saint-Sulpice is a building in Paris, France. It is listed as a monument historique, located on Place Saint-Sulpice in the 6th arrondissement of Paris. It was constructed from 1820 to 1838 for the Seminary of Saint-Sulpice, which occupied it until 1906. Since 1922 it has been used by the French Ministry of Finance.

== History ==
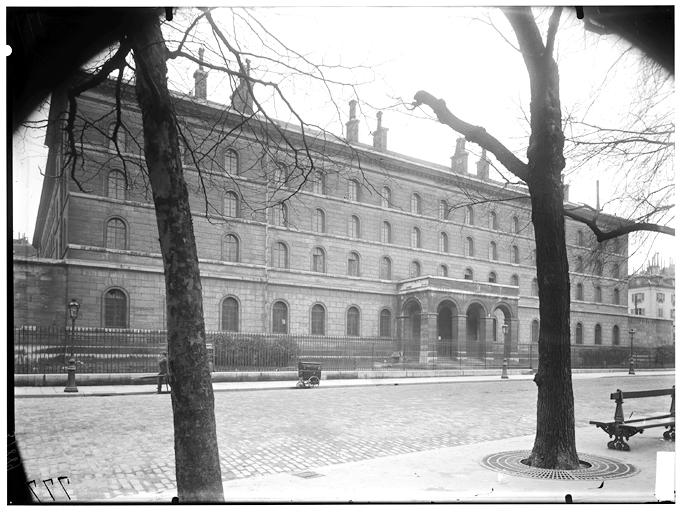
Photographie d'Eugène Atget (1910).

A new seminary financed two-thirds by the State, one-third by the city, was rebuilt to the south of the square from 1820 to 1838 on the plans of the City architect Étienne-Hippolyte Godde for the Society of the Priests of Saint Sulpicereestablished by Louis XVIII on April 3, 1816. This building was built partly on land belonging to the former seminary enlarged by the expropriation of houses on rue du Pot-de-Fer, current rue Bonaparte and rue Férou.

The 1905 French law on the Separation of the Churches and the State led to the evacuation in December 1906 of the seminary which was assigned to the Fine Arts administration to create a museum of living artists which was not built. The building, used to accommodate victims of the 1910 Great Flood of Paris and then to accommodate refugees and soldiers on leave from World War I, was assigned in 1922 to the Ministry of Finance. A project of restitution to the Company of Priests of Saint-Sulpice was abandoned in 1924.

== Architecture ==
The building includes four buildings, ground floor and three floors, inspired by Italian palaces, with a massive and austere appearance, around an interior courtyard forming a cloister. A chapel dedicated to the Virgin with stained glass windows and a coffered ceiling, located perpendicular to the southern body of the building (opposite the facade on the square), is an administrative premises that is not accessible.

== See also ==
- List of monuments historiques in Paris
- Jean-Jacques Olier
- Saint-Sulpice Seminary (France)
