= Saint-Sulpice Seminary (Montreal) =

Building in Montreal, Canada (1687-)

Coordinates: 45°30′14″N 73°33′25″W

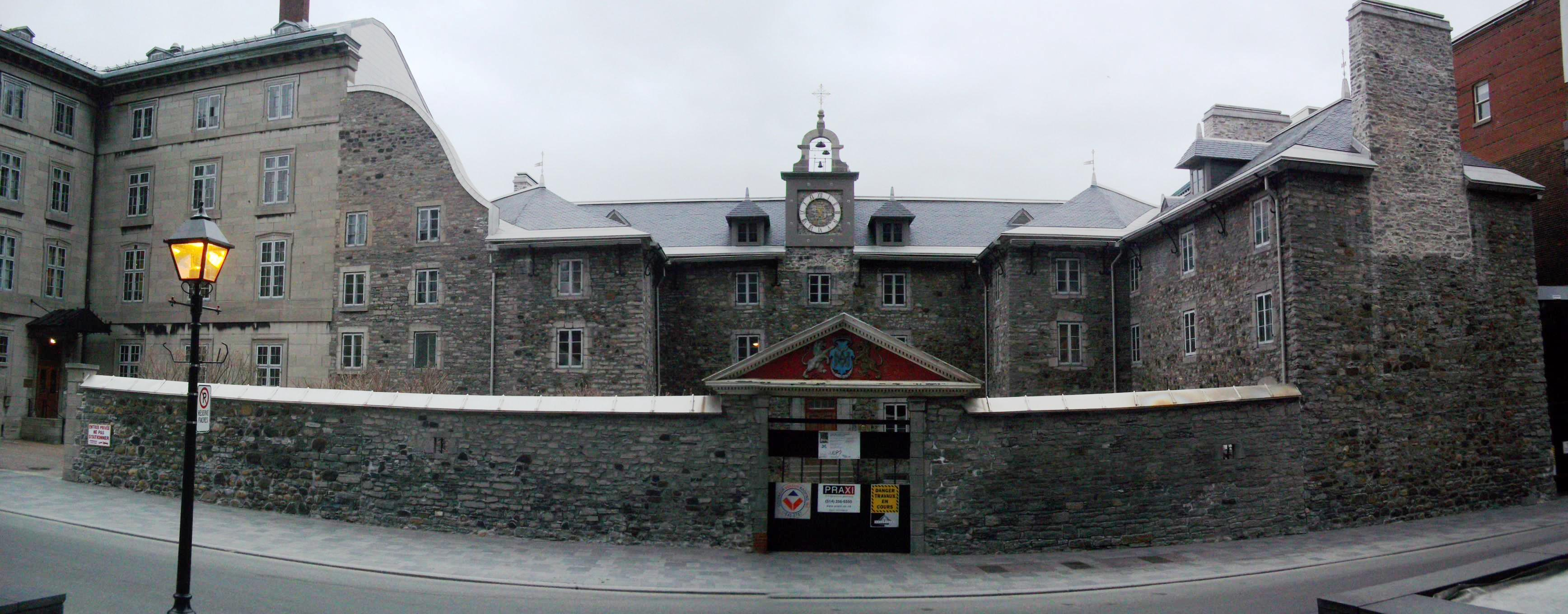
Panorama of Saint-Sulpice Seminary

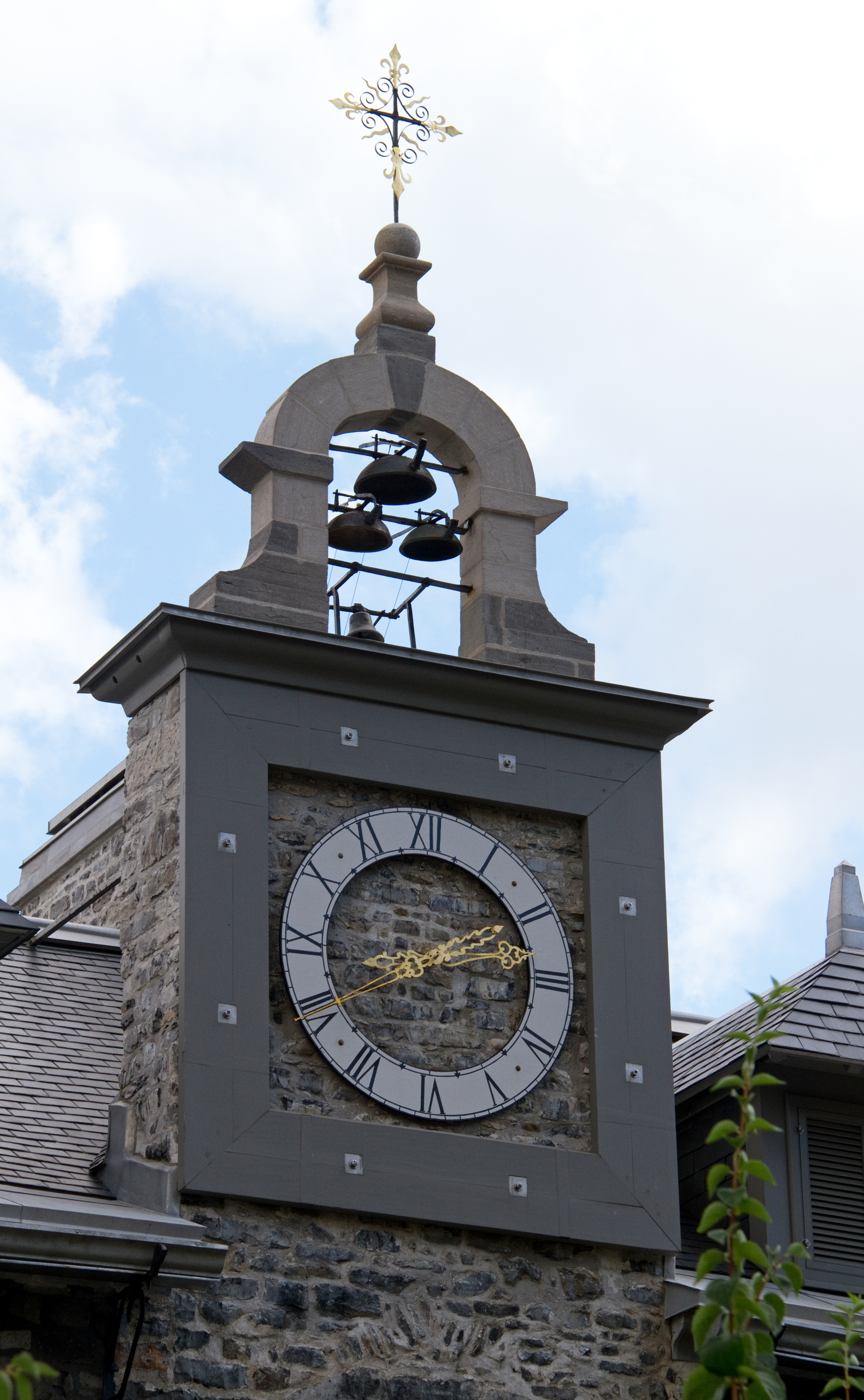
The Clock

The Saint-Sulpice Seminary (French: Vieux Séminaire de Saint-Sulpice) is a building in Montreal, Quebec, Canada. It is the second oldest structure in Montreal and was declared a National Historic Site of Canada in 1980. It is located in the Ville-Marie Borough in the Old Montreal district, next to Notre-Dame Basilica on Notre-Dame Street, facing Place d'Armes. The seminary is a classic U-shaped building featuring a palatial style and includes an annex.

Saint-Sulpice Seminary was founded in 1657 by the Society of Priests of Saint Sulpice, who have been the sole owner of the building since its creation. Construction began in 1684 by François Dollier de Casson, superior of the Sulpicians, and was completed in 1687, although later additions, such as the clock, were completed by 1713. It was dedicated to the education of secular priests and to mission work among native peoples in New France.

== Clock ==
The façade of the building is adorned with a clock, constructed and installed in 1701, near the top. The clock’s dial was created in Paris, engraved by Paul Labrosse and gilded by the Sisters of the Congregation of Notre-Dame.

The clock is one of the oldest of its kind in North America.

== Seminary gardens ==
Following a monastic tradition, the Sulpicians built a garden in the 17th century near their seminary to grow fruits and vegetables. The garden borrowed the French tradition from the Renaissance of the geometrical arrangement of the aisles with the lawn and central statue.

The gardens are one of the oldest gardens of its kind in North America.

== Notable alumni ==
- James Augustine Healy, first known African-American Catholic priest in history; later transferred to Sulpician seminary in Paris.

== See also ==
- Saint-Sulpice Seminary (Issy-les-Moulineaux)

== Bibliography ==
- Hustak, Alan. “[Saint Patrick’s of Montreal: The Biography of a Basilica].” The Gazette (Index-Only). 1998.
- Leitch, Gillian Irene. “Community and Identity in Nineteenth Century Montreal: The Founding of Saint Patrick’s Church.” University of Ottawa Canada, 2009.'
- Oliver Maurault, "Le Troisieme Centenaire de Saint-Sulpice" (Montreal: Le Devoir) 1941.
- "Saint-Sulpice Seminary and its Gardens". Directory of Designations of National Historic Significance of Canada. Parks Canada. Retrieved August 17, 2011.
- Saint-Sulpice Seminary and its Gardens. Canadian Register of Historic Places. Retrieved August 17, 2011.
- Santerre, Frédéric. "The Sulpicians of Montreal and Their Books: A Legacy of National Importance in Quebec." Catholic Library World 94 no.3 (April 2024): 170-182.
- The Canadian Province Sulpicans, "A brief history: The Society of Saint Sulpice in Canada"
- "The Old Seminary and Notre-Dame Basilica". Old Montreal Web site. Retrieved 2009-01-08.
- "National Historic Sites Of Canada System Plan". Parks Canada. Retrieved 2009-01-08.
