= John Bernard Fitzpatrick =

American Roman Catholic bishop (1812–1866)

The Right Reverend John Bernard Fitzpatrick
- Bishop of Boston
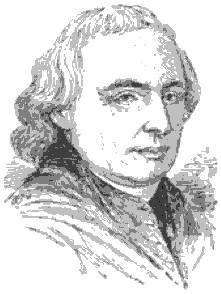
- Church: Roman Catholic Church
- See: Boston
- Installed: August 11, 1846
- Term ended: February 13, 1866
- Predecessor: Benedict Joseph Fenwick
- Successor: John Joseph Williams
- Previous post: Coadjutor Bishop of Boston (1844–1846)

Orders
- Ordination: June 13, 1840
- Consecration: March 24, 1844

Personal details
- Born: November 1, 1812 Boston, Massachusetts, United States
- Died: February 13, 1866 (aged 53) Boston, Massachusetts, United States
- Education: Petit Seminaire; Seminary of St. Sulpice

John Bernard Fitzpatrick (November 1, 1812 – February 13, 1866) was an American Catholic prelate who served as Bishop of Boston from 1846 until his death in 1866.

== Biography ==
=== Early life ===
John Fitzpatrick was born on November 1, 1812, in Boston, Massachusetts, to Bernard and Eleanor Flinn. A tailor, Bernard Flinn had emigrated in 1805 to the United States with his family from King's County in Ireland. John Fitzpatrick's maternal grandfather served in a Massachusetts regiment during the American Revolution. As a young child, he served as an altar boy and attended the local primary schools.

After attending local primary schools, Fitzpatrick was a pupil at the Boston Latin School from 1826 to 1829, during which time he distinguished himself for his studies and conduct.

At the suggestion of Bishop Benedict Fenwick, Fitzpatrick then enrolled at the Petit Seminaire, run by the Sulpician Fathers, in Montreal, Quebec. In addition to his studies, Fitzpatrick was named professor of rhetoric and belles-lettres during his fourth year in the seminary. He also became fluent in Latin, Greek, and French by this time. After graduating from the Petit Seminaire in 1837, Fitzpatrick entered the Seminary of St. Sulpice in France, where he did his theological studies.

=== Priesthood ===
While still in Paris, Fitzpatrick was ordained to the priesthood for the Diocese of Boston by Archbishop Pierre-Dominique-Marcellin Bonamie on June 13, 1840. After Fitzpatrick returned to Boston in November 1840, the diocese assigned him as a curate at Holy Cross Cathedral in Boston and St. Mary's Parish in the North End of the city. At that time, St. Mary's was troubled by two contending pastors; Fenwick had placed the parish under interdict after one faction interrupted a mass of the opposing priest. In 1842, Fenwick named Fitzgerald as pastor of a new parish in East Cambridge, Massachusetts, where he erected a church.

=== Coadjutor bishop and bishop of Boston ===
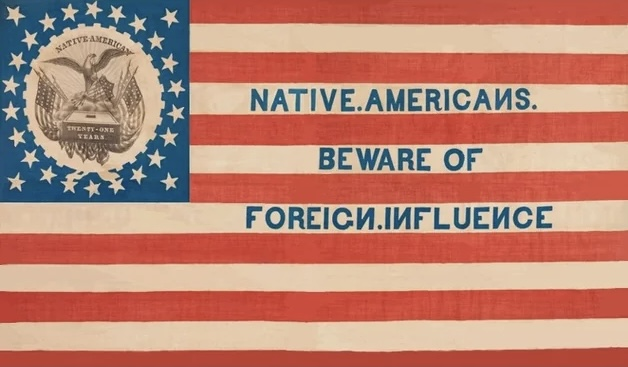
Know Nothing Flag

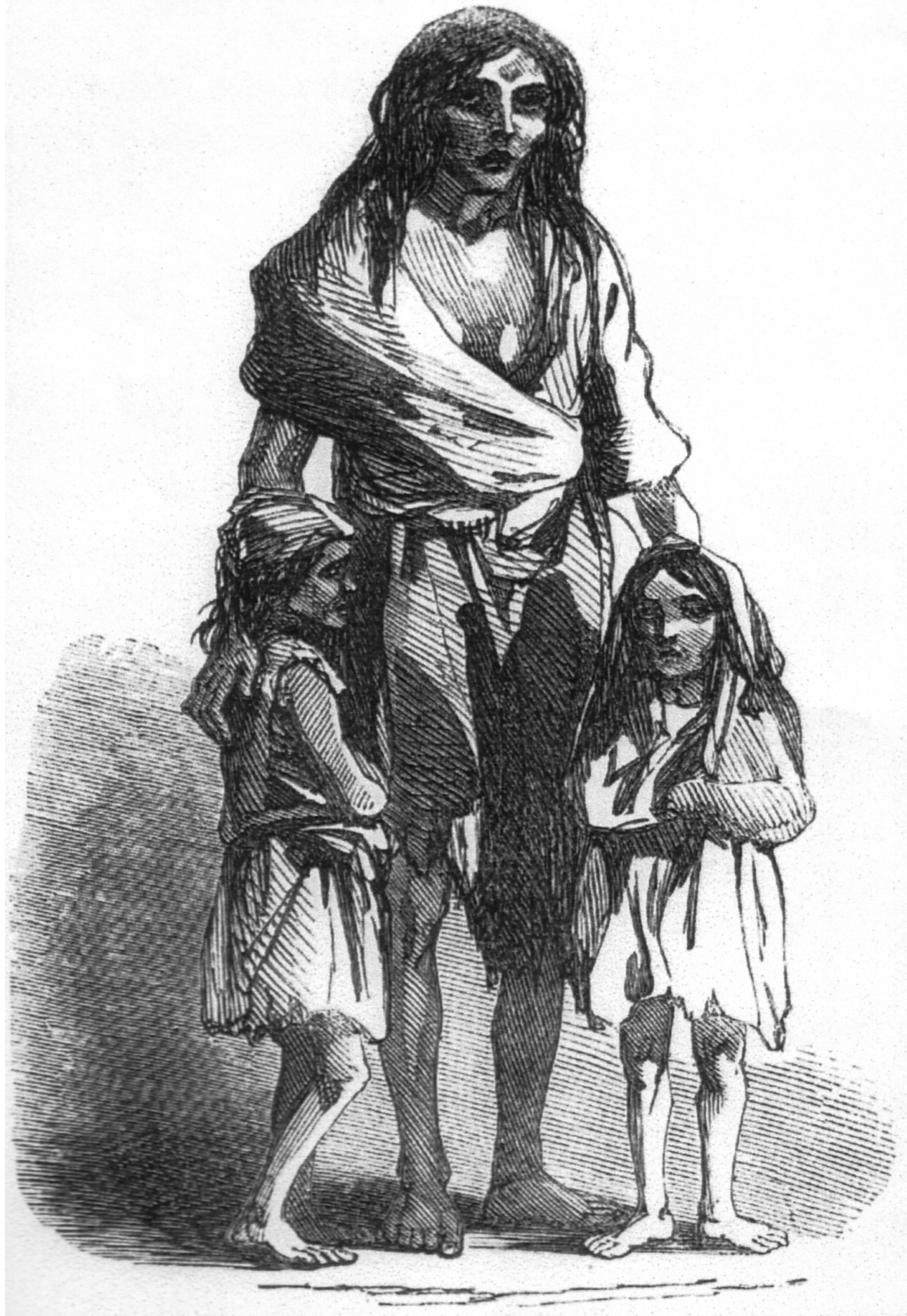
Great Famine, Ireland (1849)

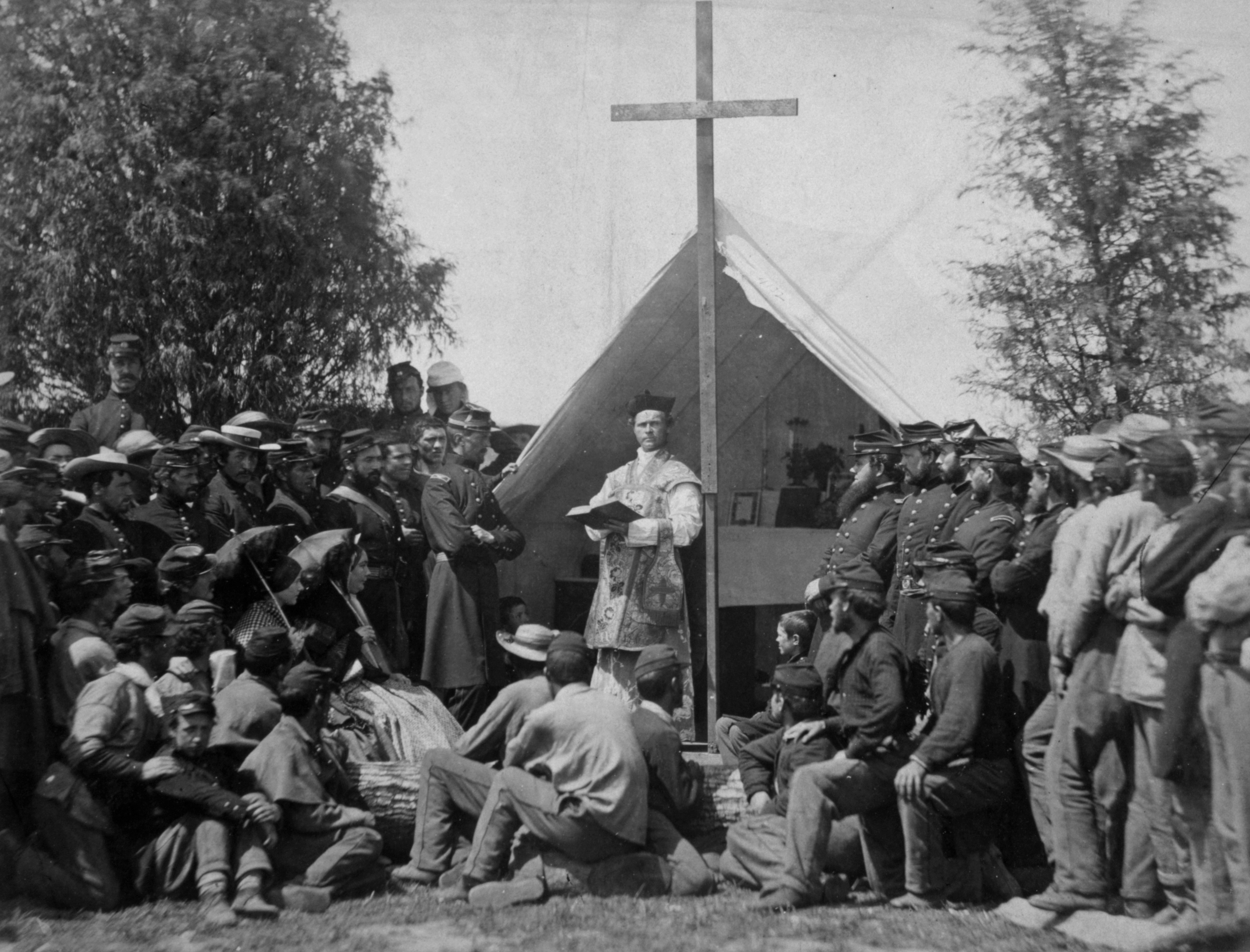
Catholic chaplain ministering to Union Army soldiers (1861)

On November 21, 1843, Pope Gregory XVI appointed Fitzpatrick as titular bishop of Callipolis and coadjutor bishop of Boston to assist Fenwick. Fitzpatrick received his episcopal consecration on March 24, 1844, from Fenwick, with Bishops Richard Vincent Whelan and William Tyler serving as co-consecrators, at Georgetown, Massachusetts. Fitzpatrick then assumed many of Fenwick's duties, including administering confirmation, conducting episcopal visitations, investigating parish affairs, and preaching at the cathedral. In 1844, he received philosopher and author Orestes Brownson into the Catholic Church. He also attended the Sixth Provincial Council of Baltimore in 1846 in Fenwick's absence.

When Fenwick died on August 11, 1846, Fitzpatrick automatically succeeded him as the third bishop of Boston. According to reports, he was warmly received his parishioners, and became popularly known as "Bishop John." His visitations to parishes in 1847 extended over most of the diocese, which at that time included all of Northern New England. Following the outbreak of the Great Famine in Ireland, Fitzpatrick strongly encouraged Catholics to contribute to the relief effort there. He declared "Apathy and indifference, on an occasion like this, are inseparable from crime!" Fitzpatrick later sent $20,000 from the archdiocesan funds to Archbishop William Crolly of the Archdiocese of Armagh in Ireland.

Fitzpatrick's tenure also coincided with the anti-Catholic Know Nothing movement. He petitioned Mayor Josiah Quincy Jr. to allow Catholic priests to visit dying Catholic inmates at Deer Island, and protested when Catholics were either forced to pay an extra tax or outright rejected when purchasing cemetery plots. In March 1859, a staff member at a Boston public school whipped a Catholic boy for refusing to recite the Ten Commandments from a Protestant bible. Fitzpatrick filed a strong complaint with the Boston School Committee and urged the boy's parents to sue them. As a result of this incident, the School Committee added several Catholic laymen and a priest.

During this period, Know Nothing mobs tarred and feathered several priests in the diocese, including Reverend Johannes Bapst of Ellsworth, Maine. They burned Catholic churches in Dorchester, Massachusetts, Manchester, New Hampshire, and Bath, Maine. Fitzpatrick urged Catholics not to attack the Know Nothings as it would only benefit their movement.

In 1853, the Vatican erected the Dioceses of Burlington and Portland, taking the States of Vermont and Maine out of the Diocese of Boston. In June 1855, Fitzpatrick appointed Reverend James Augustine Healy, the first African-American to be ordained a priest, as the first chancellor of the Diocese of Boston.

During the American Civil War, Fitzpatrick supported President Abraham Lincoln and the Union cause, providing Catholic chaplains for the heavily Irish Massachusetts regiments. He visited Belgium in 1862 for what he claimed as health reasons; however, others (including the American diplomats Ambrose Dudley Mann and Henry Shelton Sanford) believed he was working for the Union cause in Europe. The diocesan newspaper declared, "Boston participates in the joy that pervades the whole country" when General Robert E. Lee surrendered the Confederate States Army to Lt. General Ulysses S. Grant of the Union Army on April 9, 1865 at the Appomattox Court House in Appomattox, Virginia.

=== Death and legacy ===
During his 20-year tenure, Fitzpatrick raised the number of both priests and parishes from 40 to 300; established an orphanage, hospital, college; and increased the number of religious communities fivefold. After his health began to fail, he received John Joseph Williams as his coadjutor.

Fitzpatrick died in Boston on February 13, 1866 at age 53.

== Episcopal succession ==
Catholic Church titles
Preceded by Bishop Benedict Joseph Fenwick	3rd Bishop of Boston; 1846–1866	Succeeded by Archbishop John Joseph Williams
