= Saint-Sulpice Seminary (France) =

Catholic seminary (1641-)

- Séminaire Saint-Sulpice (French)
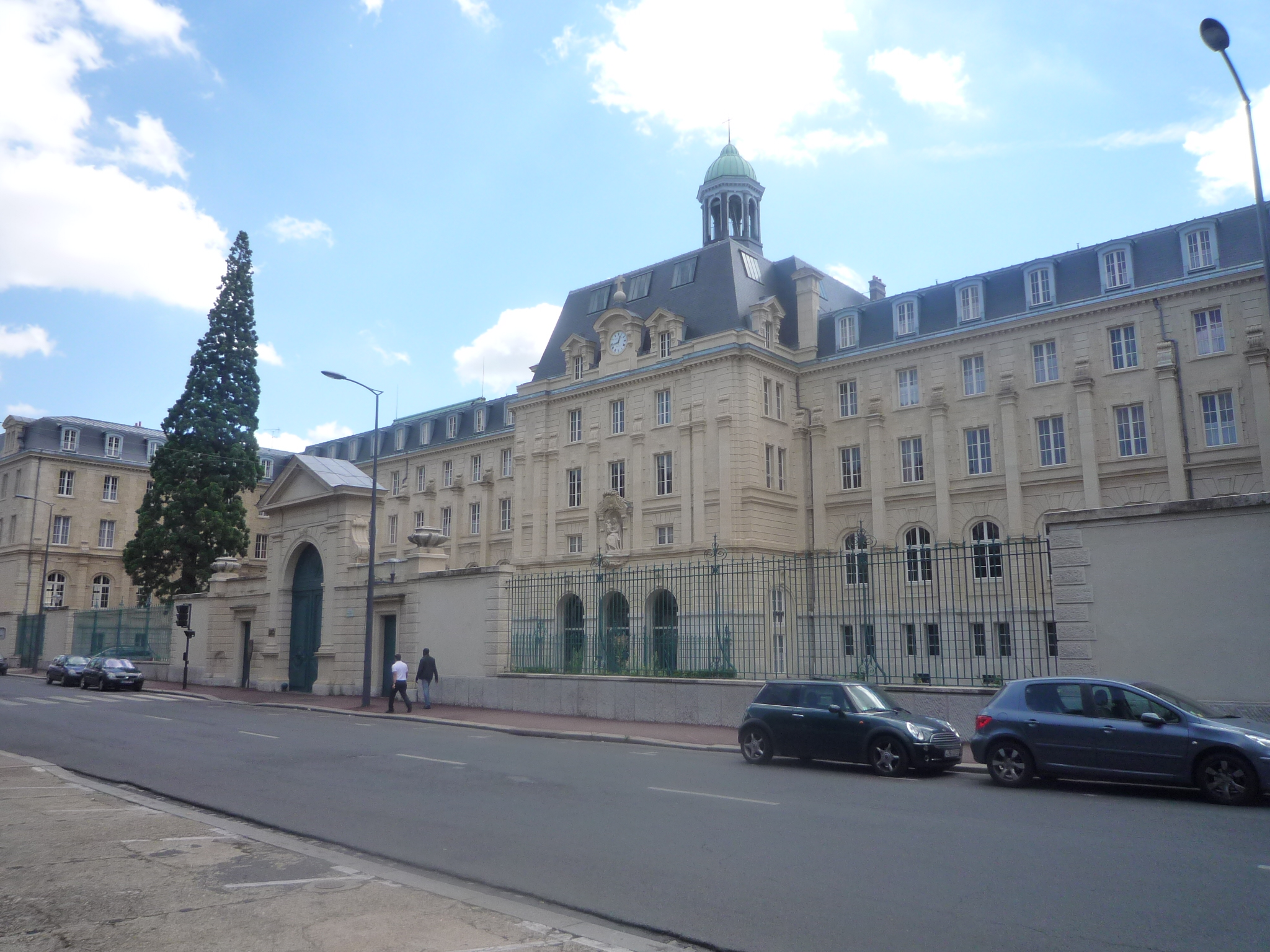
- Type: Seminary
- Established: 1641
- Founder: Jean-Jacques Olier
- Religious affiliation: Catholic (Sulpician)
- Location: Issy-les-Moulineaux, Île-de-France, France; 48°49′31″N 2°16′37″E
- Website: seminairesaintsulpice.fr

The Saint-Sulpice Seminary (French: Séminaire Saint-Sulpice) is a Catholic seminary run by the Society of the Priests of Saint Sulpice, located in Issy-les-Moulineaux, France.

== History ==
The Saint-Sulpice Seminary was established in 1641 in the village of Vaugirard (now part of Paris) by Jean-Jacques Olier, the founder of the Society of the Priests of Saint Sulpice. Two other priests, François de Coulet and Jean Du Ferrier, were also instrumental in its founding. When Olier was appointed the pastor of Saint-Sulpice Church in Paris in July or August 1642, he moved the seminary to that parish, where he remained superior of the seminary. He recruited several priests to teach with him, and adopted a new model for seminaries, in which adults from different areas were brought together for preparation for the priesthood, instead of adolescents who lived nearby. By the following year, the school had a faculty of 30 priests. On 23 October 1645 received its letters patent from the King Louis XIV. The seminary's newly completed building was blessed in 1651; this building would be demolished in 1802.

In 1655, the Society moved the seminary to its present-day location in Issy-les-Moulineaux. The building was built in the 16th century and was acquired by Queen Margaret of Valois in 1606. The property was then owned by the family of Alexandre Le Ragois de Bretonvilliers, who inherited it and bequeathed it to the Society upon his death in 1676.

Jean-Jacques Olier, appointed priest of the Saint-Sulpice parish in 1642, bought in 1645 from a relative a garden and 3 buildings on rue du Vieux-Colombier where he had a building built from 1649 to 1651 by the architect Jacques Lemercier in which he transferred his training house for priests founded in 1641 to Vaugirard at a time when the education of the clergy was very neglected. This building was located on the site of the current Place Saint-Sulpice, set back from the church which was smaller than the current building. The Bishop of Paris asked him to ensure the training of all postulants for the priesthood of the diocese. This institution served as a model for the founding of seminaries in France.

Jean-Jacques Olier decided to rebuild the Saint-Sulpice church based on plans by Christophe Gamard, the first stone of which was laid in 1646 and the construction work lasted more than 140 years. To highlight the church, the architect Giovanni Niccolò Servandoni, author in 1732 of the design of the facade, designed a square which required the demolition of the seminary, close to the new facade, 10 meters from the north tower. This destruction could only be completed after the suppression of the religious congregations in 1792. The demolition of the seminary decided by Bonaparte in 1800 cleared the square which was leveled and planted with trees in 1838.

Séminaire sur plans anciens

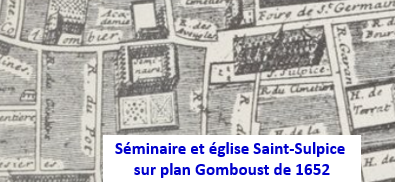
Séminaire sur plan Gomboust de 1652.

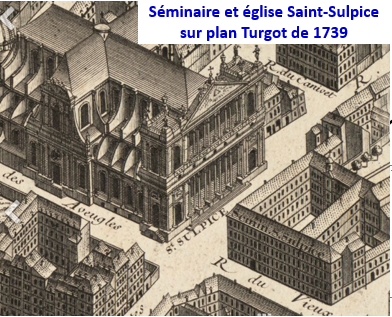
Séminaire sur plan Turgot de 1739.

== Notable alumni ==
- Peter Bourgade
- Louis William Valentine DuBourg
- Patrick Francis Healy
- James Augustine Healy
- Jacques-Marie-Adrien-Césaire Mathieu
- Emmanuel Joseph Sieyès
- Timothy Smiddy

== See also ==
- Saint-Sulpice Seminary (Montreal)
