= British and Canadian School Building =

Heritage building in Chinatown, Montreal, Canada

British and Canadian School Building Wing's Noodles Building
- Édifice de l'École-Britannique-et-Canadienne-de-Montréal; Maison Wing's Noodles
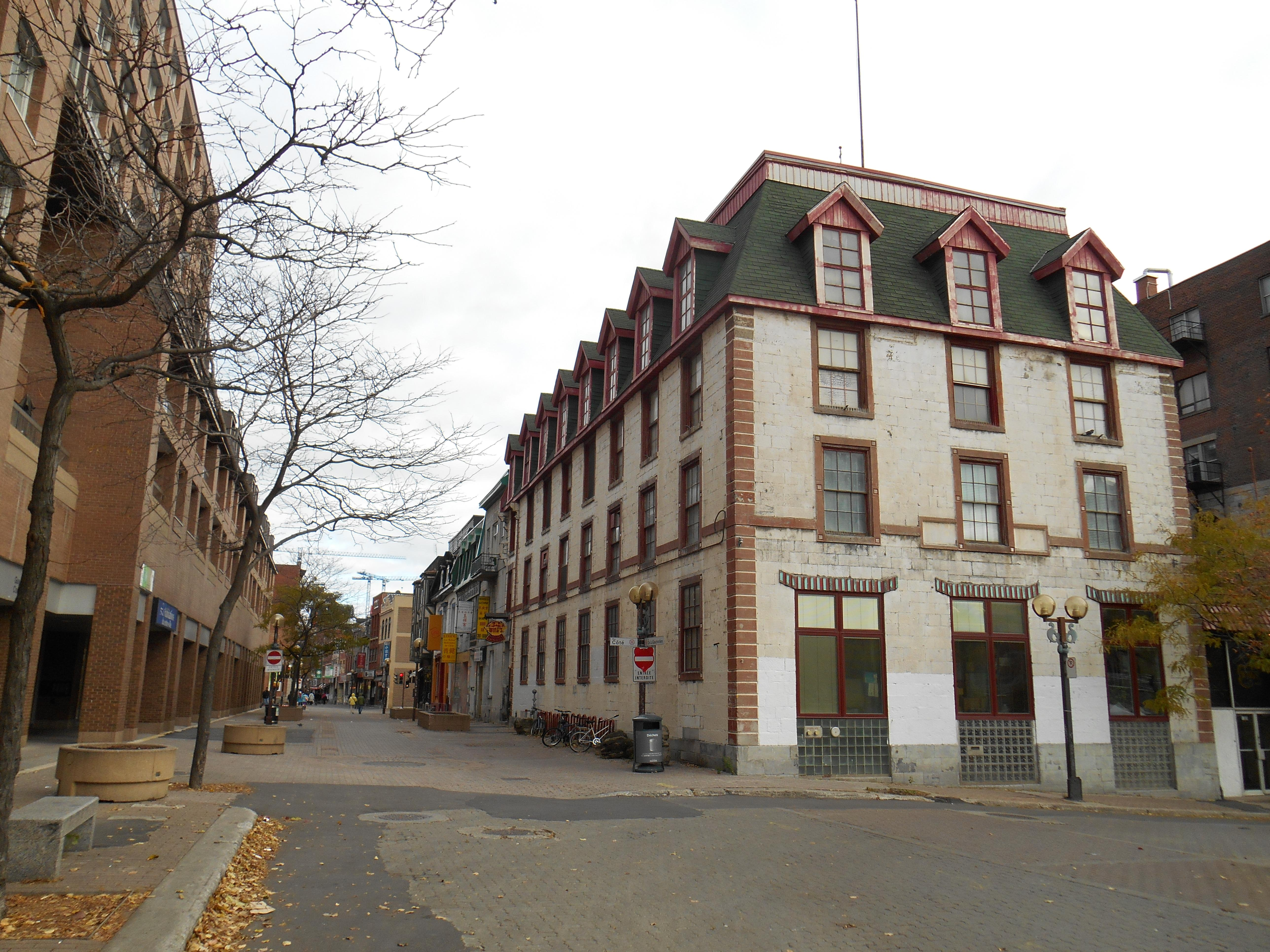
- British and Canadian School Building in 2013
- Interactive map of the British and Canadian School Building; Wing's Noodles Building area

General information
- Type: school, food products factory
- Location: Chinatown, Montreal, 1009 rue Côté and 120, rue De La Gauchetière Ouest, Montreal, QC H2Z 1L1, Montreal, Canada
- Coordinates: 45°30′23″N 73°33′40″W
- Current tenants: Wing Noodles Ltd.
- Year built: 1826-1827

Design and construction
- Architect: James O'Donnell
- Main contractor: John Redpath
- Designations: Partie de Site patrimonial du Noyau-du-Quartier-Chinois, église de la Mission catholique chinoise du Saint-Esprit Immeuble patrimonial classé (façade en 2023) Partie d'un bien patrimonial du Québec (1978, 2023)

The British and Canadian School of Montreal Building or Wing Noodles Ltd. Building is an historic building, former English-language school and Chinese food products factory in the heart of Montreal's Chinatown district. The building forms part of the Site patrimonial du Noyau-du-Quartier-Chinois, which is part of the Cultural heritage of Quebec.

The building was originally built between 1826 and 1827 by contractor John Redpath for the British and Canadian School of Montreal. It was designed by architect James O'Donnell, who also designed the Notre-Dame Basilica (Montreal).

== School ==
The school initially operated as an unincorporated association, but in 1859 The British and Canadian School Society of Montreal was incorporated by special act of the province of Canada.

== Factory ==
The building was home to Wing Noodles, the last factory operating in the neighbourhood. The Lee family produced Chinese food products for more than 75 years. The noodles manufacturer moved into the former school building in 1965, and in 1970 expanded its operations into the building formerly occupied by S. Davis & Sons, a cigar factory building built in 1884. It closed in 2025.
