= Notre-Dame Church (Montreal) =

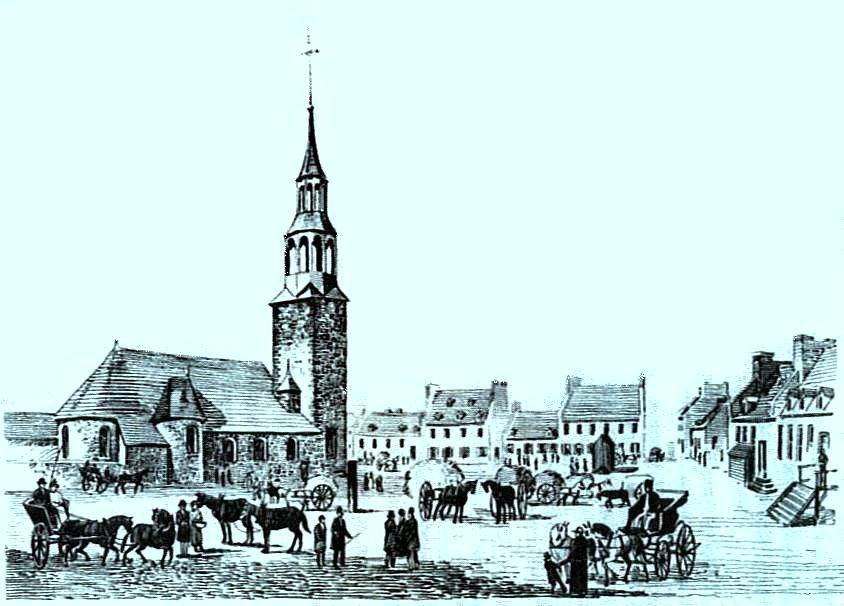
- Notre-Dame Church
- 45°30′16.15″N 73°33′22.55″W
- Location: Place d'Armes, Montreal
- Country: Canada
- Denomination: Roman Catholic

History
- Status: Church; Cathedral (1821-1822)
- Dedication: Mary (mother of Jesus)
- Dedicated: 1682

Architecture
- Architect: François Bailly
- Groundbreaking: June 29, 1672
- Completed: 1682
- Closed: 1829
- Demolished: 1830 (bell tower 1843)

Specifications
- Materials: Fieldstone

The Notre-Dame Church was a church in Old Montreal that stood from 1682 until 1830. From 1821 to 1822, it served as the first cathedral of the Diocese of Montreal.

== History ==
In 1657, the Roman Catholic Sulpician Order arrived in Ville-Marie, now known as Montreal. The parish they founded was dedicated to Mary, and the parish church of Notre-Dame was built between 1672 and 1682. A cross was planted to designate the future emplacement of the church on June 29, 1672 and the next day the first five stones of the church were laid.

The church served as the first cathedral of the Diocese of Montreal from 1821 to 1822.

Throughout the 18th century, the city's primary landmarks were the bell tower of Notre-Dame and Citadel hill.

By 1824 the congregation had completely outgrown the church, and James O'Donnell, an Irish-American Protestant from New York, was commissioned to design the Notre-Dame Basilica. The church was demolished in 1830 and the bell tower in 1843. Foundations from the original Notre-Dame Church lie under Place d'Armes, and were unearthed during the square's 2009-2011 renovations.

== Organists ==
- Jean Girard (1725-1765)

== Burials ==
Burial took place in chapel inside the church and in a cemetery outside. The cemetery opened in 1672 and closed in 1830 as the current basilica was being built. Some graves were re-interred in 1799 to Saint-Antoine Cemetery in what is now Dorchester Square and Notre Dame des Neiges Cemetery after bylaw prevented burials within the city in 1853. but some were not exhumed and remain buried under the new buildings.

Notable burials at the old church included:

- Kondiaronk, Chief of the Hurons, buried after a majestic funeral in August 1701. The inscription on his resting place read: Cy git le Rat, Chef des Hurons ("Here lies the Muskrat, Chief of the Hurons"). No trace of the grave remains today, though it is thought that he lies somewhere near the Place d'Armes.
- Pierre Gaultier de Varennes, sieur de La Vérendrye and his wife, at St. Anne's Chapel.

== Gallery ==
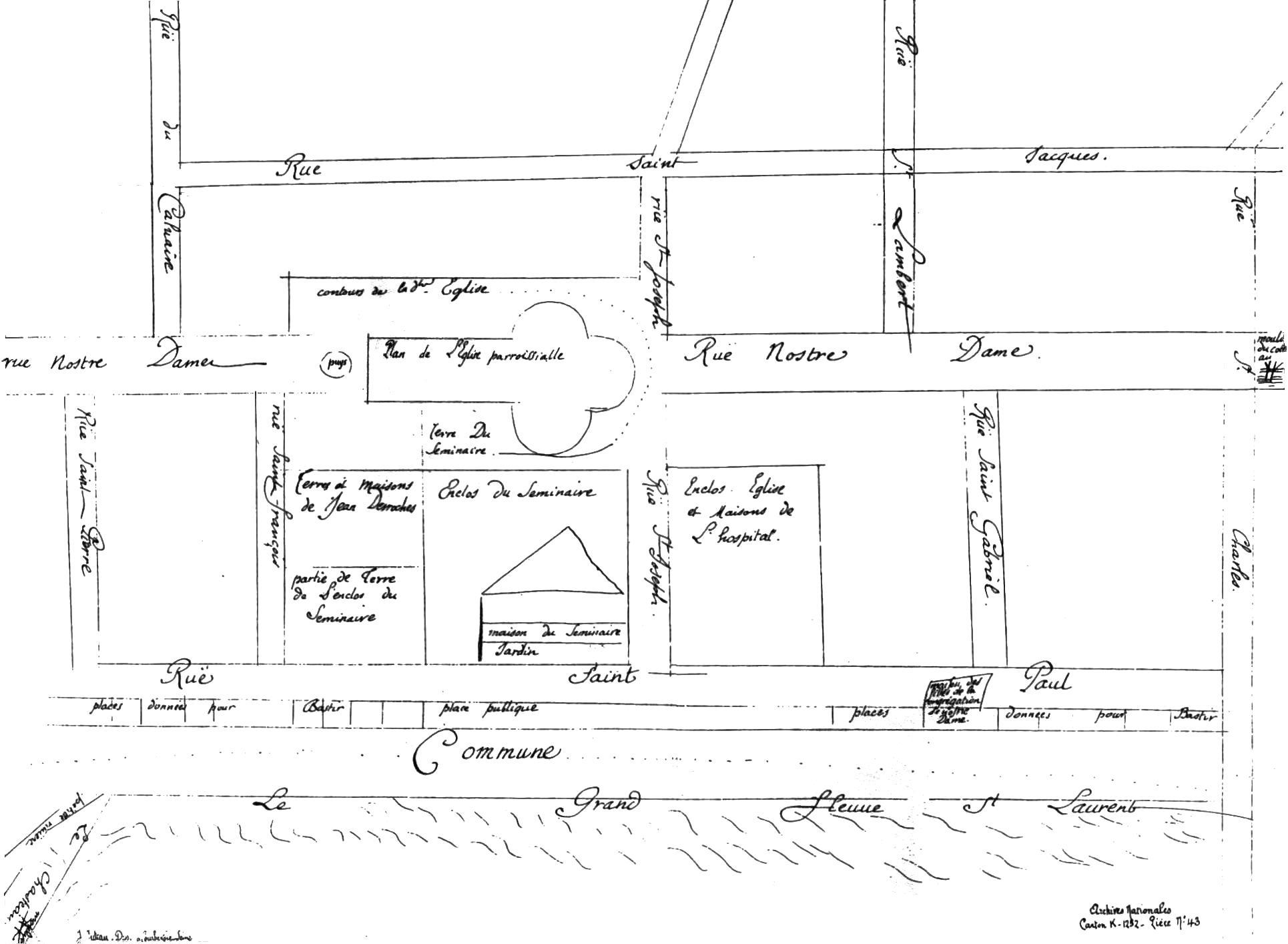
It was in the centre of town - Dollier de Casson's street plan, 1672

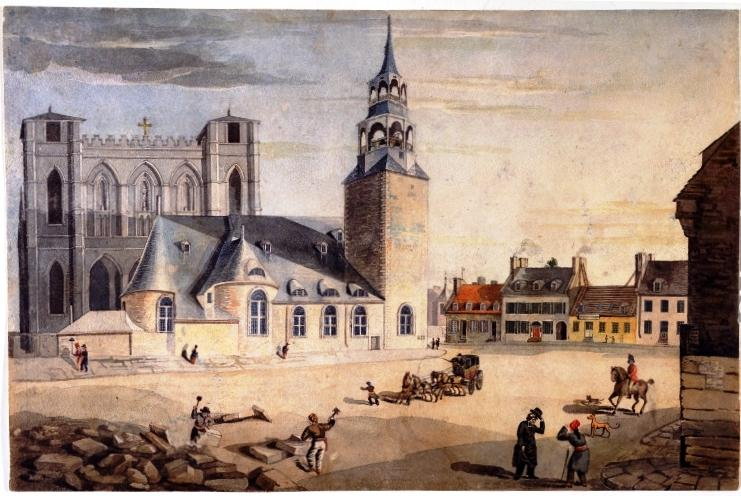
Place d'Armes in 1828; Notre-Dame Basilica is under construction

== See also ==
- Notre-Dame Basilica
