= Blet (disambiguation) =

Blet may refer to:

- Blet, a commune in France
- Bletting, a process associated with the ripening of some fruits
- Stéphane Blet (1969-2022), French pianist and composer

BLET may refer to:

- Brotherhood of Locomotive Engineers and Trainmen
