= UGC 1922 =

Spiral galaxy in the constellation Triangulum

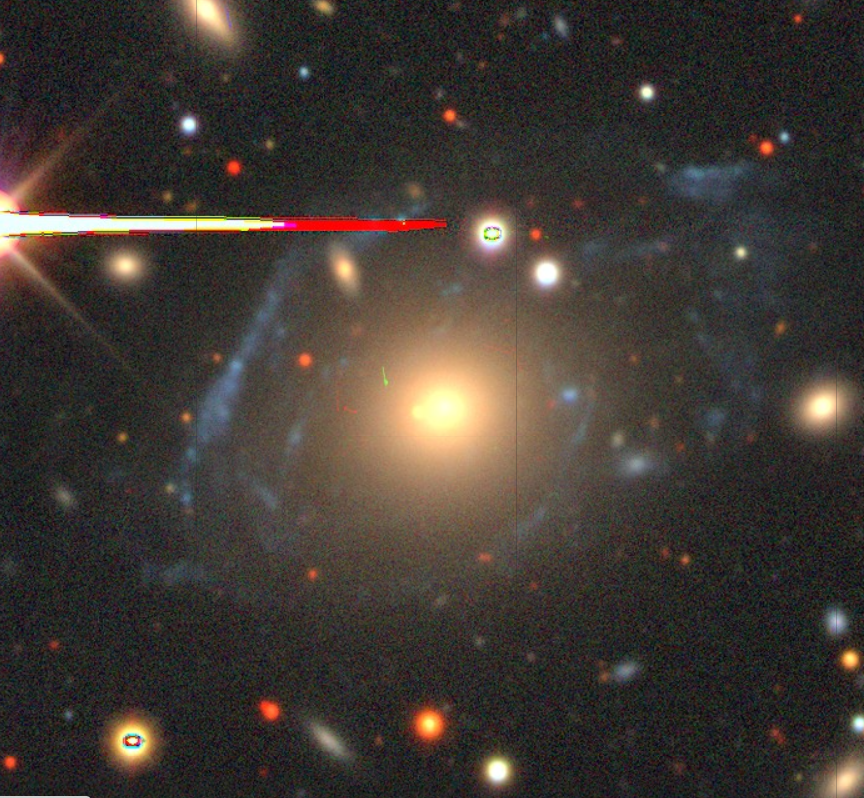
- DESI Legacy Surveys image of UGC 1922.

Observation data (J2000 epoch)
- Constellation: Triangulum
- Right ascension: 02^{h} 27^{m} 45.84^{s}
- Declination: +28° 12′ 33.07″
- Redshift: 0.036375
- Heliocentric radial velocity: 10,905 km/s ± 4
- Distance: 513 Mly (157.32 Mpc)
- Apparent magnitude (V): 13.7

Characteristics
- Type: S?
- Size: ~343,000 ly (105.3 kpc) (estimated)

Other designations
- IC 226, MCG +05-06-046, 2MASX J02274583+2812332, NVSS J022745+281231, PGC 9373

UGC 1922 also known as IC 226, is a giant spiral galaxy of low surface brightness located in the constellation of Triangulum. The redshift of the galaxy is (z) 0.036 and it was first discovered in December 1891, by the Austrian astronomer named Rudolph Spitaler who described it as a faint object with a small bright center. It is part of the galaxy group called LDCE 0163.

== Description ==
UGC 1922 is a low-surface brightness galaxy shown to contain an active galactic nucleus (AGN) without a disk but has a bulge structure from which x-ray emission has been detected. Near ultraviolet emission located along the direction of a broken ring feature towards the north from the galaxy's optical center has also been detected. Other observations also detected the emissions along its own spiral arm in the northeastern direction and also from the compact regions. At 610 MHz frequencies the emission shows an extended feature in the south, while at 1420 MHz frequencies, emission is resolved as a mini-spiral feature. Two massive star forming regions have been found in the northwest direction from the center of the galaxy.

The total global star formation of the galaxy is estimated to be 2.2^{18} M_{☉} per year. It also underwent a recent major galaxy merger, based on a study published in 2018, that found there is an irregular feature on the northwest side of its disc. As a whole, the galaxy has an overheated stellar disk with spiral arms depicted as both clumpy and irregular. A supermassive black hole lying inside the center of the galaxy, has been estimated to be 0.39^{+0.18}_{-0.15} × 10^{6} M_{☉}.

A study published in 2003, found the galaxy shows the presence of carbon oxide emission. Based on observations, most of the emission is concentrated within its central bulge region, described as having a bright appearance. The major axis of the emission is also offset, suggesting it is located within the ring region of the central core.

== Supernova ==
One supernova has been observed in UGC 1922:

- SN 1989S (Type Ia, mag. 19) was discovered by Jean Muller on 29 October 1989.
