= François Bailly =

French mason and architect (c.1630–1690)

- Born: c. 1630; La Rochelle, Aunis France
- Died: 1690 (aged 59–60); Montreal, Quebec, Canada
- Occupation(s): Mason, architect
- Known for: Notre-Dame Church (Montreal)

François Bailly (c. 1630-1690) was a French mason, architect and official who was a prominent citizen in Montreal.

== Biography ==
Born in France, he came to Canada in 1659 under contract with the Abbé Queylus. He formed partnerships first with Urbain Brossard then with Michel Bouvier. His most notable work was the Notre-Dame Church (Montreal), built under the direction of François Dollier de Casson, which was on a grander scale than the Notre-Dame de Québec Cathedral in Quebec City.

Bailly also held public offices. By 1663 Bailly had joined the Sainte-Famille militia. In 1667, he was appointed a sergeant-royal and in 1676 a prison warden.

== Works ==
While Notre-Dame was his greatest project, Bailly also was commissioned on other projects:

- barn for Hotel-Dieu at Fort Ville-Marie 1659 (demolished 1688) now site of Montreal Museum of Archaeology and History
- unknown bakery in Montreal 1683

== Gallery ==
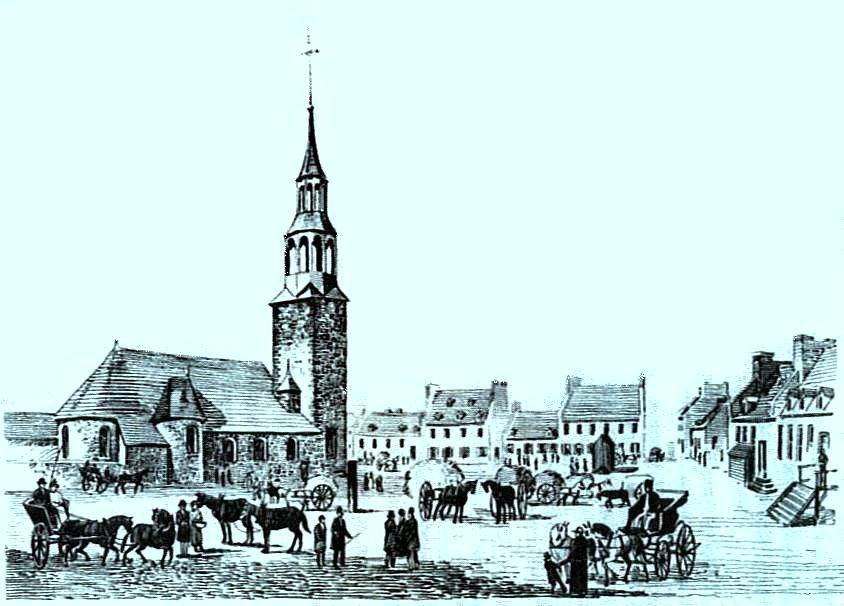
Notre-Dame Church (Montreal)

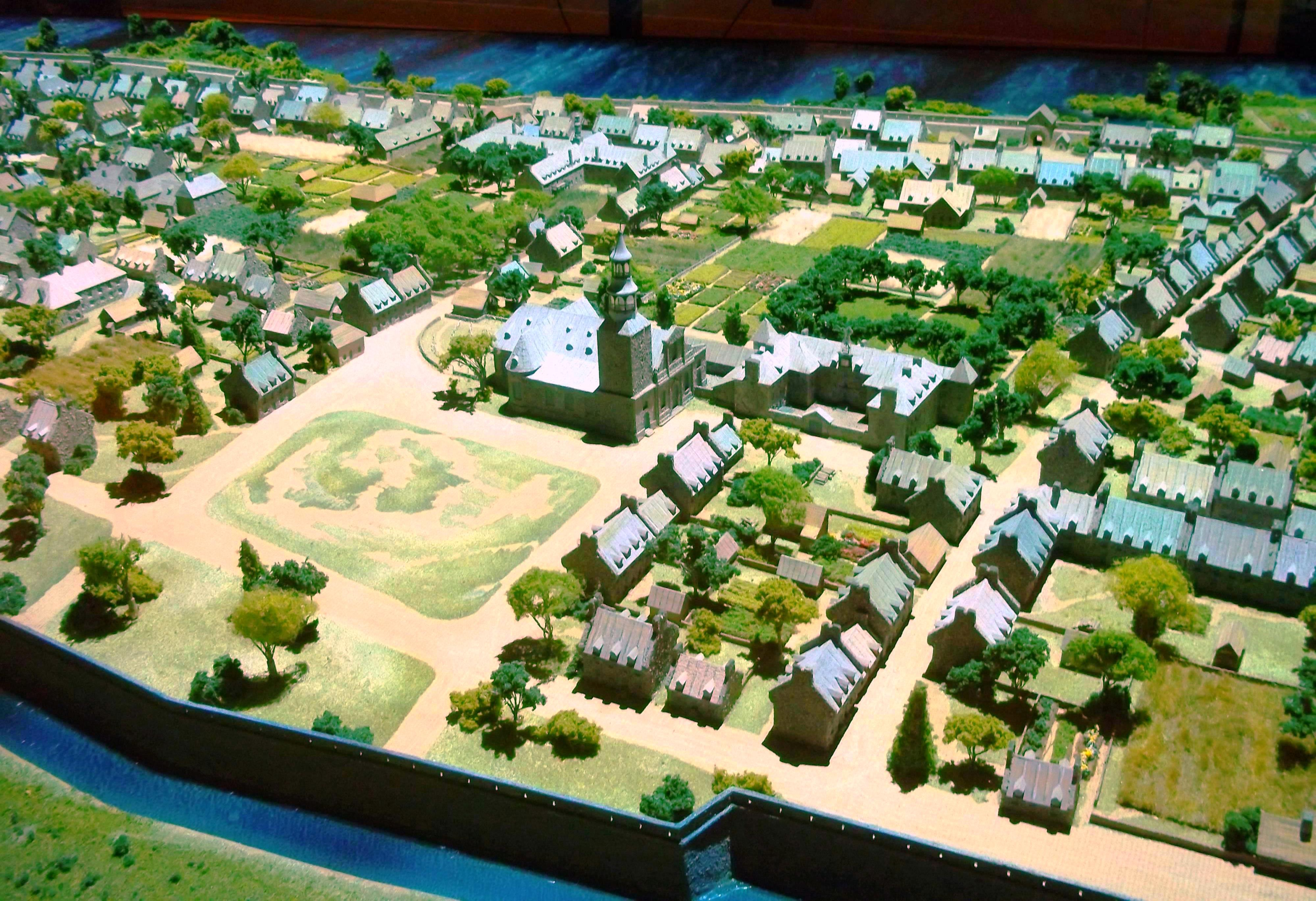
Notre-Dame Church district in Montreal

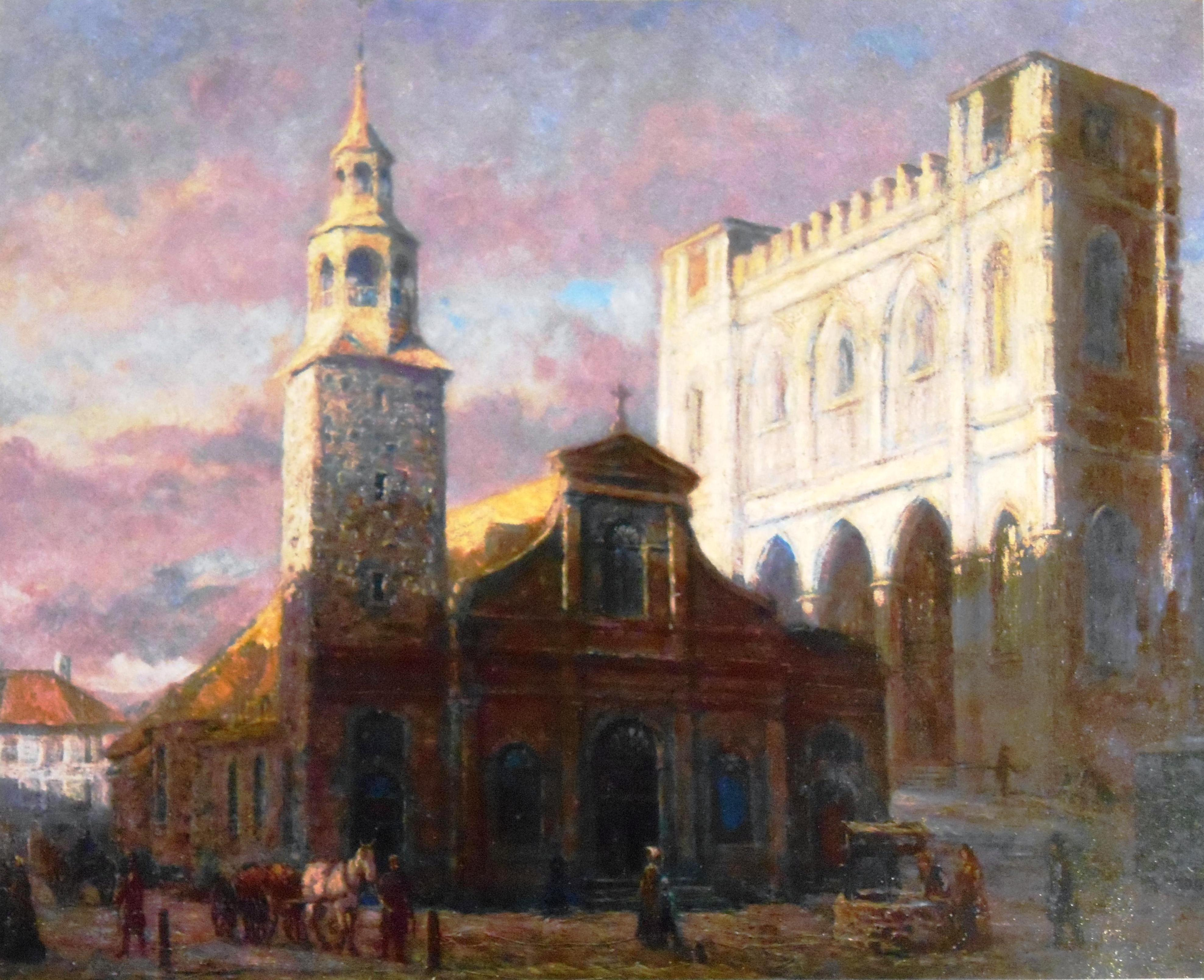
The Notre-Dame Basilica next to the old church

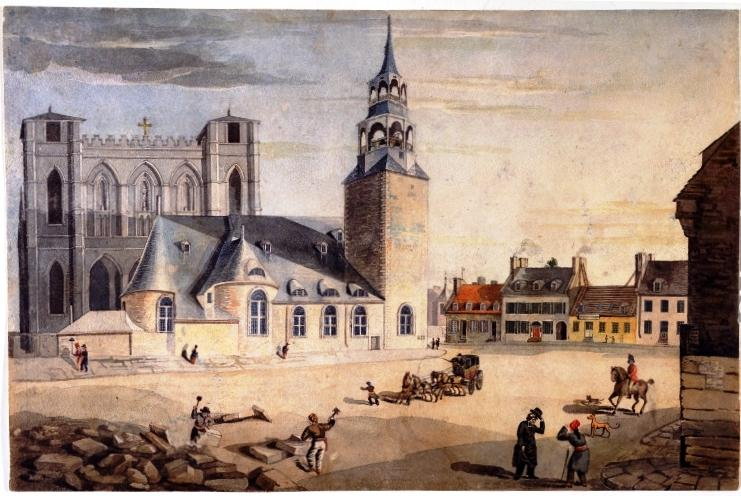
Place d'Armes in 1828
