= Pierre-Jean Chalençon =

French antiques collector

Pierre-Jean Chalençon is a French antiques collector, television personality, and expert on Napoléon Bonaparte.

== Biography ==
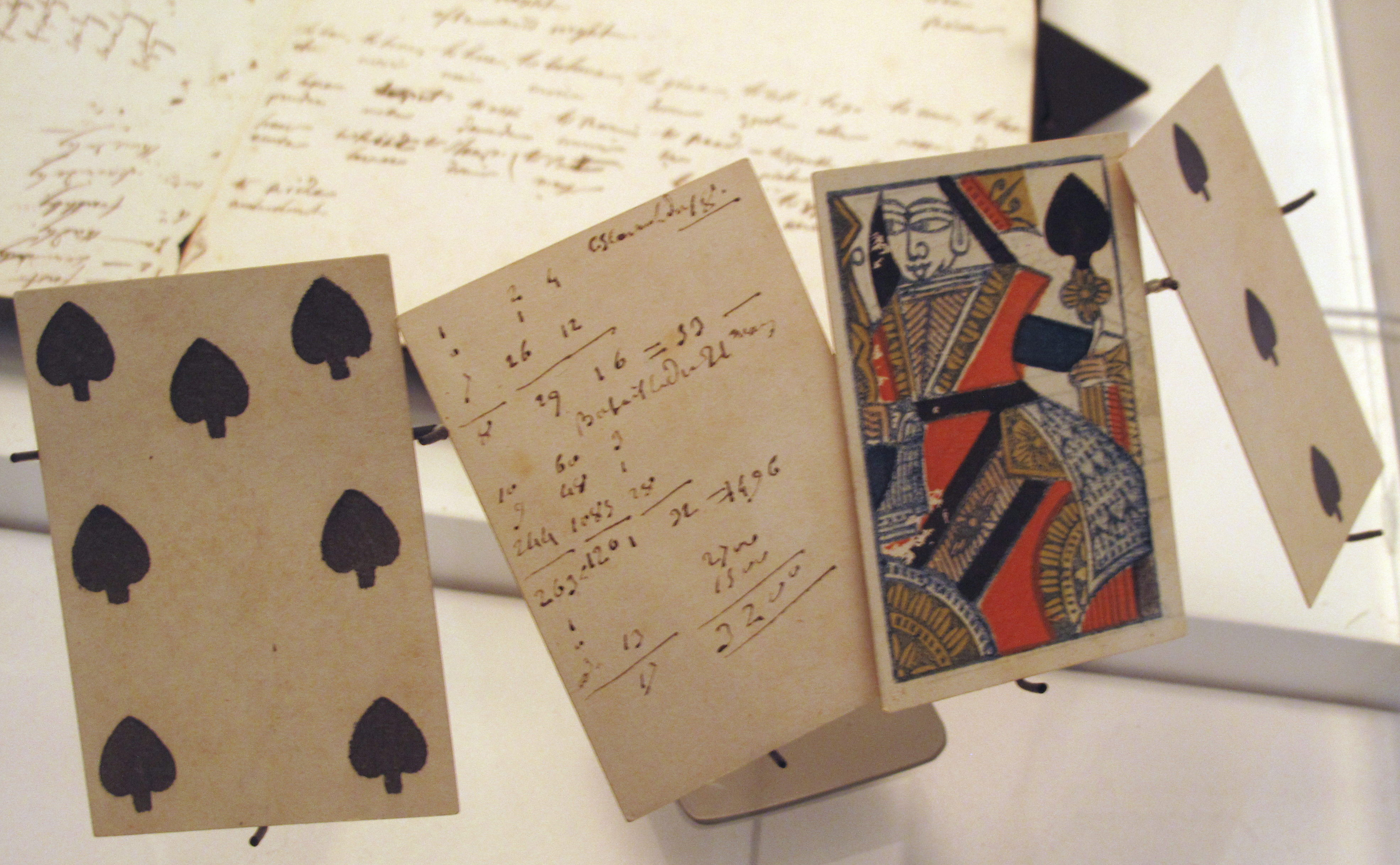
Playing cards of Napoleon

Pierre-Jean Chalençon began collecting Napoleonic objects when he was a teenager. His first item is a letter from Napoleon dated 1860. He buys his items at auction houses, and in 2010 he estimated that his collection of items that belonged to Napoleon comprised between 2000 and 3000 pieces.

Among the known items he owned were one of Napoleon's hats, the original Civil Code, Napoleon's marriage contract with Josephine de Beauharnais, Napoleon's ring... He also purchased one of Napoleon's thrones.

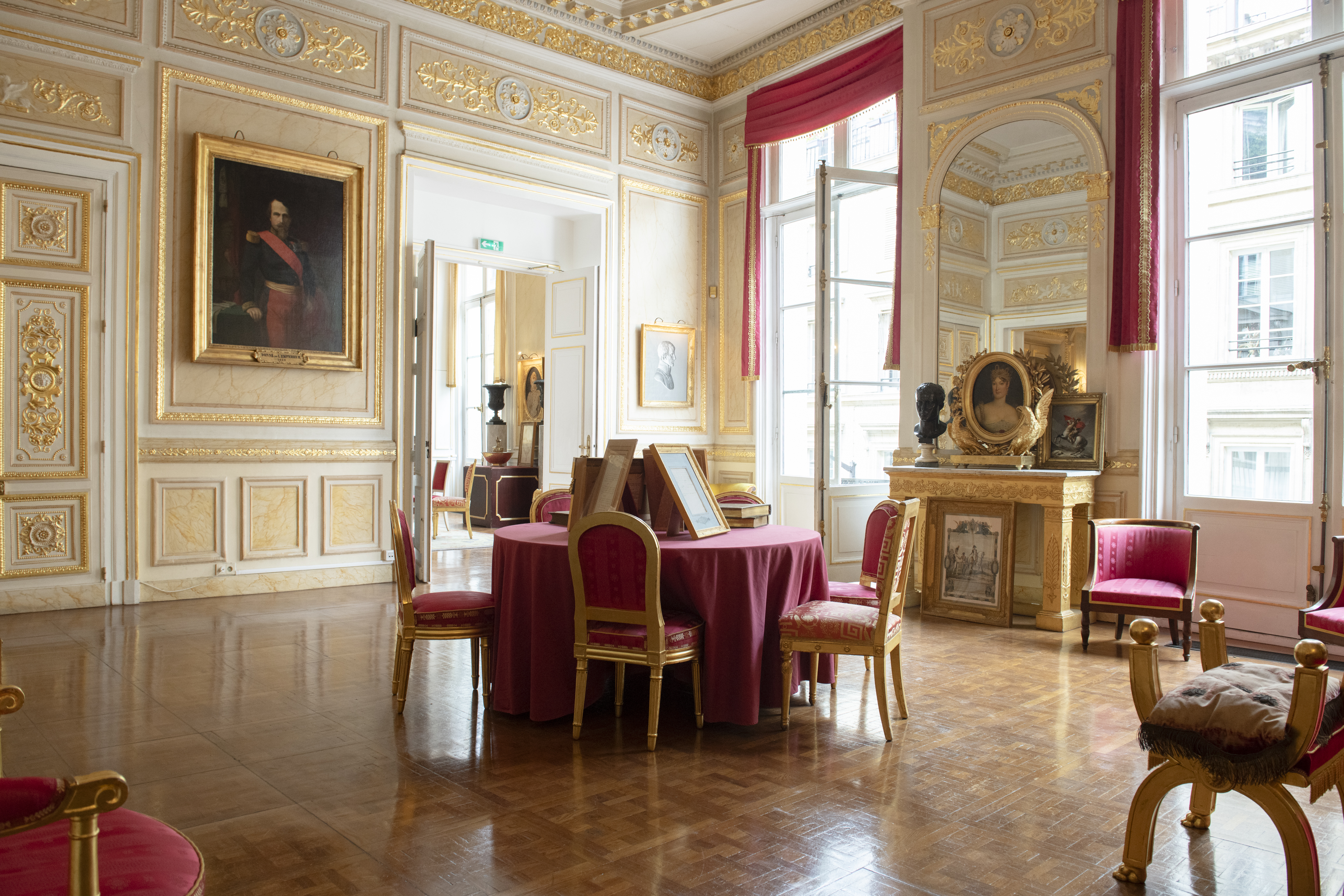
Palais Vivienne

To display his collection, Pierre-Jean Chalençon bought the Palais Vivienne in Paris in 2015, a private mansion transformed into a museum. The Duke of Orléans, son of King Louis-Philippe I, lived in this private mansion in the 19th century. The collection of Pierre-Jean Chalençon has traveled the world from Asia to the United States.

He is a supporter and a friend of the politician Jean-Marie Le Pen, as well as of Eric Zemmour. He is a supporter of US President Donald Trump, he has visited Mar-a-Lago and is a friend of Jason Miller, one of Donald Trump's advisors.

He has decided to sell part of his collection in 2025 through the Sotheby's auction house for 8.7 million euros.

== Career ==
=== Jean-Marie Le Pen's birthday and television departure ===
Pierre-Jean Chalençon was part of a group of friends invited by Jean-Marie Le Pen to lunches at his home in Rueil-Malmaison, described as "eccentric and extremist figures". Attendees included Bruno Gollnisch, Marie d'Herbais, Éric Hamers, Éric Zemmour, Alexandre Simonnot, business leaders and members of the Interallié circle.

On 24 June 2020, he attended the 92nd birthday celebration of Jean-Marie Le Pen, posing with pianist Stéphane Blet and comedian Dieudonné, both previously convicted of hate speech. Amid the ensuing scandal, he left the France 2 programme Affaire conclue "in agreement with the production". After initially claiming the departure was mutual, he later admitted he had lied and had in fact been dismissed.

In 2021, he also attended, "in the greatest secrecy", the religious marriage of Jean-Marie and Jany Le Pen.

=== Support for Éric Zemmour in the 2022 French presidential election ===
He was among the personalities present at Éric Zemmour's first campaign rally for the far-right party Reconquête. He voted for Zemmour in the first round of the 2022 French presidential election.

=== Support for Donald Trump in the 2024 US presidential election ===
He attended the Second inauguration of Donald Trump alongside a French far-right delegation including Marion Maréchal and Éric Zemmour, declaring: "Trump will cleanse this world of leftist madness…".

=== Media controversies (October 2025) ===
==== Reaction to the Louvre jewellery theft ====
Following the Louvre jewellery theft on 19 October 2025, Chalençon posted an emotional video on X addressing the thieves directly: "Return the Crown jewels!" His reaction went viral. On 28 November 2025, he released the single "Rendez les bijoux".

==== Racist remarks on GPTV ====
On 20 October 2025, Chalençon appeared on Géopolitique profonde (GPTV), an online channel linked to Russian propaganda and conspiracism. Discussing the Louvre theft, he made racist remarks:

There is a Maghrebi overpopulation that is murdering us. We have to shut up because we Catholics are so kind that soon we'll be slaughtered in our own homes and still have to say thank you. Soon we won't be able to eat pork anymore. We've had enough of the bamboula.

==== Racist remarks about Rachida Dati on Cyril Hanouna's show ====
On 30 October 2025, on the controversial programme Tout beau, tout neuf hosted by Cyril Hanouna on W9, Chalençon caused outrage by calling Rachida Dati the "queen of couscous". La France Insoumise MP Aurélien Saintoul announced he would refer the matter to Arcom.

== Legal affairs ==
=== Clandestine dinners (2021) ===
In March–April 2021, during a COVID-19 lockdown, after an M6 report on clandestine restaurants in Paris, the website Arrêt sur images revealed the existence of a private dining club run by chef Christophe Leroy, as well as private dinners organized at the Palais Vivienne, Chalençon's property. On 14 March 2021, the chef posted on Instagram a photo with Chalençon inviting guests to an "exceptional moment at the Palais Vivienne on 1 April 2021 for a dinner-evening from 5:45 pm, around a caviar and champagne menu"; mask-wearing was prohibited there. Undercover on camera, Chalençon claimed to have "dined this week in two or three clandestine restaurants, with a number of ministers", before his lawyer told AFP it was merely "humour". The Paris judicial police was seized by the Paris prosecutor for endangering the lives of others and undeclared work.

On 9 April 2021, Chalençon and Leroy were placed in police custody. Days later, Chalençon's own lawyer was indicted for fraud against a vulnerable person.

=== Forced sale of the Palais Vivienne (2023–2025) ===
Since 2015, Chalençon had managed the real-estate company owning the Palais Vivienne, a 506.41 m² apartment at 36 Rue Vivienne he had bought for €4.5 million and renamed "Palais Vivienne". Seized by the courts on 3 October 2023 over his inability to repay a €10 million loan from Swiss Life, the property was put up for auction by the Paris Judicial Court on 23 May 2024. The forced sale was postponed to 21 November 2024 after a filing by Chalençon, described as dilatory by the creditor's lawyer. In June 2024, the property reopened as "Morning Panoramas", operated by the event-office company Morning.

After several postponements, the property was again put up for auction on 13 March 2025, no solution having been found to repay Swiss Life. The auction was once more postponed, to 19 June 2025, due to a procedural flaw. The Palais Vivienne was finally sold at auction by the Paris Judicial Court on 6 November 2025 for €8 million to Swiss Life, with no other buyers.

=== Complaint for racist insults (2024) ===
On 23 June 2024, a French journalist of Moroccan origin filed a complaint against Chalençon for racial insults at a Paris police station. The previous evening, at a dinner on the Rue de Lille, during a discussion of Jean-Marie Le Pen's conviction for antisemitism, he allegedly insulted her — "Arabs will always be Arabs, go home, you dirty slag" and "Shut up, you dirty bougnoule, go home!" — after pinning her to the floor and snatching her phone. The Paris prosecutor's office opened an investigation on 24 June 2024.

=== Complaint for public insult (2026) ===
During his 30 October 2025 appearance on Tout beau, tout neuf, Chalençon had called the Louvre thieves "scum" and "young suburbanites", prompting influencer Amine Kassid to post on Instagram that the theft "must not serve as a pretext for generalizations and racism." Chalençon replied in a comment: "Who are you apart from being called Amine!!!! Go to Iran to protect your Mullah buddies!!!! Long live the Shah!!", leading Kassid to file a complaint against him.
