= Adam Charles Gustave Desmazures =

Catholic priest and writer

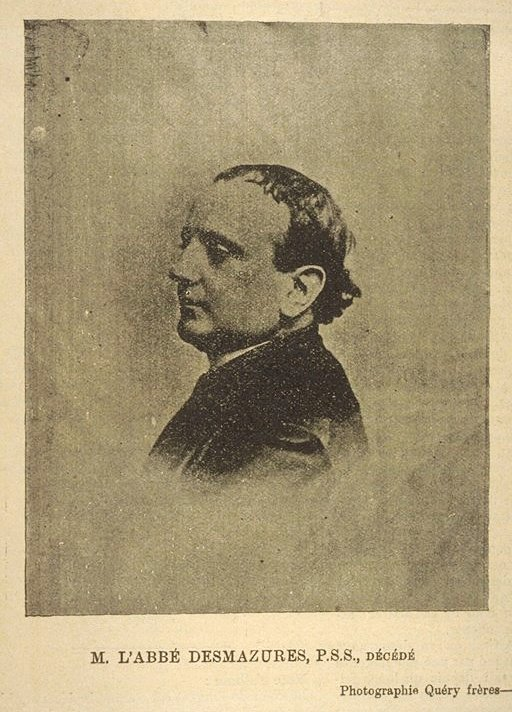
Adam-Charles-Gustave Desmazures

Adam-Charles-Gustave Desmazures (1818–1891), also known as Abbé Desmazures, was an author and Catholic priest, active in Montreal, Quebec, Canada.

Desmazures arrived in Montreal in 1851, where he became vicar of Notre-Dame de Montréal Basilica and of Saint-Jacques, and helped organize a reading group. He was later priest of St. Sulpice.

== Selected works ==
- Souvenirs de la Terre-Sainte: Moueurs et usages des tribes arabes nomades de la Syrie au temps présent, Paris: imprim. de Pillet aîné, 1845.
- Le Canada en 1868, Paris: E. Belin, [1868?].
- Eglise de St-François d'Assise, Montréal: Institut des artisans, 1870.
- Entretien sur les arts industriels, Montréal: Institut des artisans, 1870.
- Souvenirs de la persévérance de Montréal, Montréal: [s.n.], 1872.
- Explication des peintures de la chapelle Nazareth, Montréal: Eusèbe Senécal, imprimeur-éditeur, [1872?].
- M. Faillon, prêtre de St. Sulpice: sa vie et ses oeuvres, Montréal: Bibliothèque paroissiale, 1879.
- Mr. E. Picard prêtre de Saint-Sulpice, E. Sénécal, 1886.
- Colbert et le Canada, Saint-Cloud: Vve E. Belin et fils, 1889.
- M. Flavien Martineau, prêtre de St. Sulpice: esquisse biographique, Montréal: Impr. de J. Lovell, 1889.
- Cours d'archéologie: les Indes, l'Egypte, l'Assyrie, la Palestine, Montréal: [s.n.], 1890.
- Histoire du Chevalier d'Iberville, 1663-1706, Montréal: J.M. Valois, 1890.
