= Notre-Dame Basilica (Montreal) =

Catholic church in Montreal, Quebec

- Basilique Notre-Dame de Montréal (French)
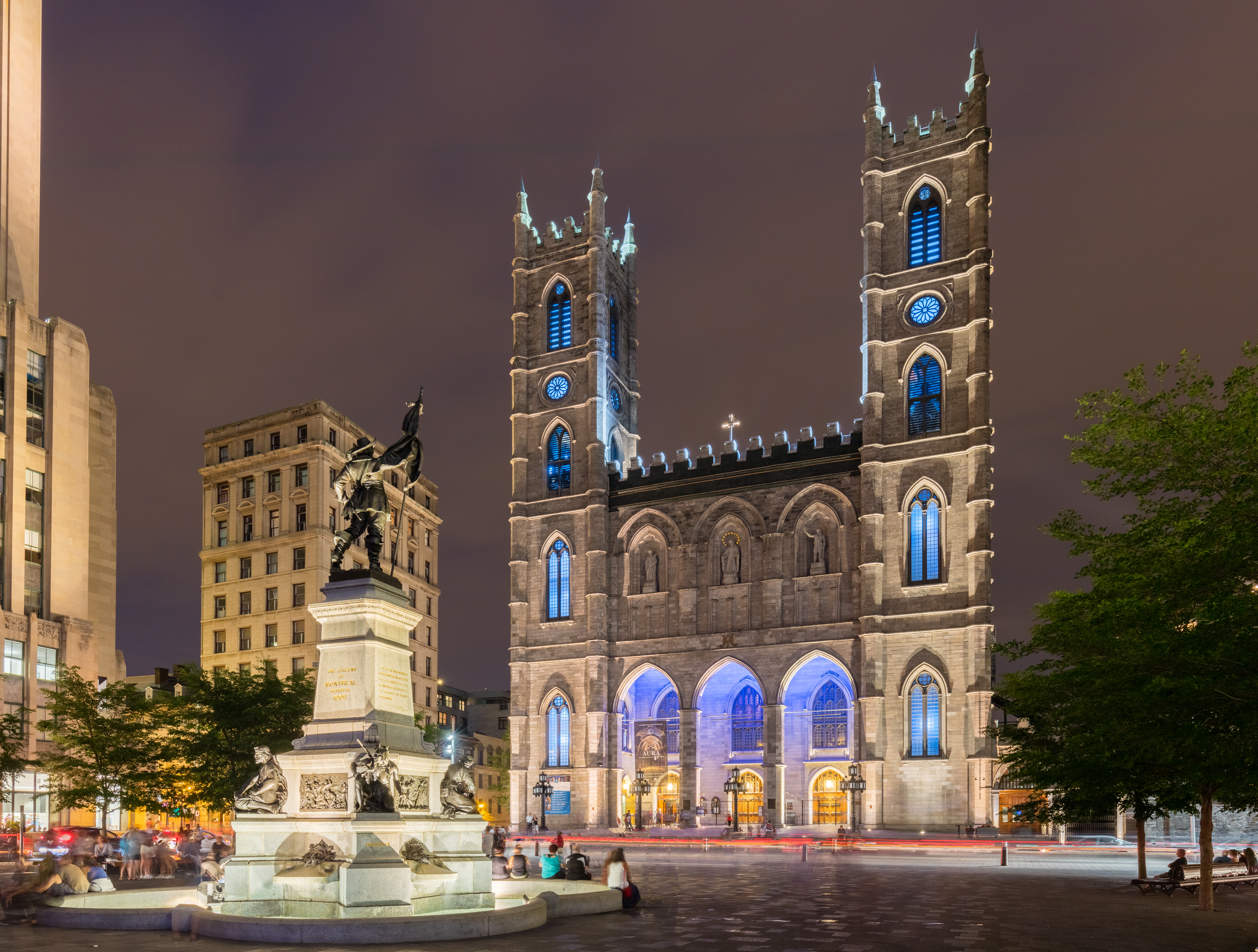
- The main frontage on Place d'Armes

- Location within Montreal
- 45°30′16″N 73°33′22″W
- Location: 110 Notre-Dame Street West; Montreal, Quebec, Canada; H2Y 1T2
- Denomination: Roman Catholic
- Website: basiliquenotredame.ca

History
- Status: Minor basilica
- Dedication: Mary
- Dedicated: July 1, 1829

Architecture
- Architect(s): James O'Donnell (exterior); Victor Bourgeau (interior)
- Style: Gothic Revival
- Groundbreaking: 1823
- Completed: 1865 (facade)
- Construction cost: £47,446 (1832)

Specifications
- Length: 79 metres (259 ft)
- Width: 46 metres (151 ft)
- Height: 60 metres (200 ft)
- Materials: Stone, which came from the Tanneries quarry in Griffintown

Administration
- Archdiocese: Montreal

National Historic Site of Canada
- Official name: Notre-Dame Roman Catholic Church / Basilica National Historic Site of Canada
- Designated: 1989

The Basilica of Our Lady of Montreal, also known as Notre-Dame Basilica of Montreal (French: Basilique Notre-Dame de Montréal, lit. 'Basilica of Our Lady of Montreal'), is a minor basilica of the Catholic Church in the historic Old Montreal district of Montreal in Quebec, Canada. It is located at 110 Notre-Dame Street West, on the corner of Saint Sulpice Street. It is situated next to the Saint-Sulpice Seminary and faces the Place d'Armes square.

Pope John Paul II raised the shrine to the status of Minor Basilica via his Pontifical decree Qui Semper on 15 February 1982. The decree was signed and notarized by Cardinal Agostino Casaroli.

The interior of the church is amongst the most dramatic in the world and is regarded as a masterpiece of Gothic Revival architecture. The vaults are coloured deep blue and decorated with golden stars, and the rest of the sanctuary is decorated in blues, azures, reds, purples, silver, and gold. It is filled with hundreds of intricate wooden carvings and several religious statues. Unusual for a church, the stained glass windows along the walls of the sanctuary do not depict biblical scenes, but rather scenes from the religious history of Montreal. It also has a Casavant Frères pipe organ, dated 1891, which comprises four keyboards, 99 stops using electromagnetic action and an adjustable combination system, 7000 individual pipes, and a pedal board.

Approximately 11 million people visit Notre-Dame Basilica every year, making it one of the most visited monuments in North America. In 2023, Notre-Dame was named the 6th most beautiful building in the world by Angi, a home service publication which analyzes TripAdvisor reviews. The publication ranked Notre-Dame de Paris second and Barcelona's Sagrada Família first.

== History ==
In 1657, the Roman Catholic Sulpicians arrived in Ville-Marie, now known as Montreal. Six years later, the seigneury of the island was vested in them, and they ruled until 1840. The parish they founded was dedicated to the Holy Name of Mary, and the parish church of Notre-Dame was built on the site in 1672. François Baillairgé, an architect, designed the interior decoration and choir 1785–95; facade and vault decoration, 1818. The church served as the first cathedral of the Diocese of Montreal from 1821 to 1822.

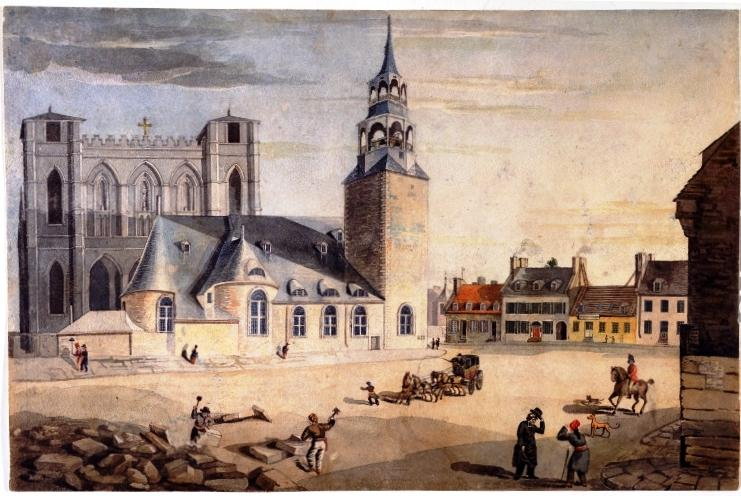
The Notre-Dame Church, with its replacement being built behind it, 1828.

By 1824, the congregation had completely outgrown the church. James O'Donnell, an Irish-American Anglican from New York City, was commissioned to design a new building, with the goal of accommodating a congregation of up to 10,000. O'Donnell was a proponent of Gothic Revival architecture, and he designed the church in that style. He intended for a terrace to be built on the exterior of the church, but this was never completed due to a lack of funding. He is the only person buried in the church's crypt. O'Donnell converted to Roman Catholicism on his deathbed and was thus buried in the crypt.

The primary construction took place between 1824 and 1829. The cornerstone was laid at Place d'Armes on September 1, 1824. The sanctuary was finished in 1830, the first tower in 1841, and the second tower in 1843. O'Donnell designed the towers to be traditionally Gothic, and he intended for them to be seen from any point in the city. Following O'Donnell's death, John Ostell, an English-born architect, finished the towers according to O'Donnell's original plans. Upon completion, the church was the largest in North America, and it remained so for over fifty years. Samuel Russell Warren constructed a new organ in 1858. The facade of the church was completed in 1865 and included three statues by French sculptor Henri Bouriché, which were of Saint Joseph, the Virgin Mary, and John the Baptist.

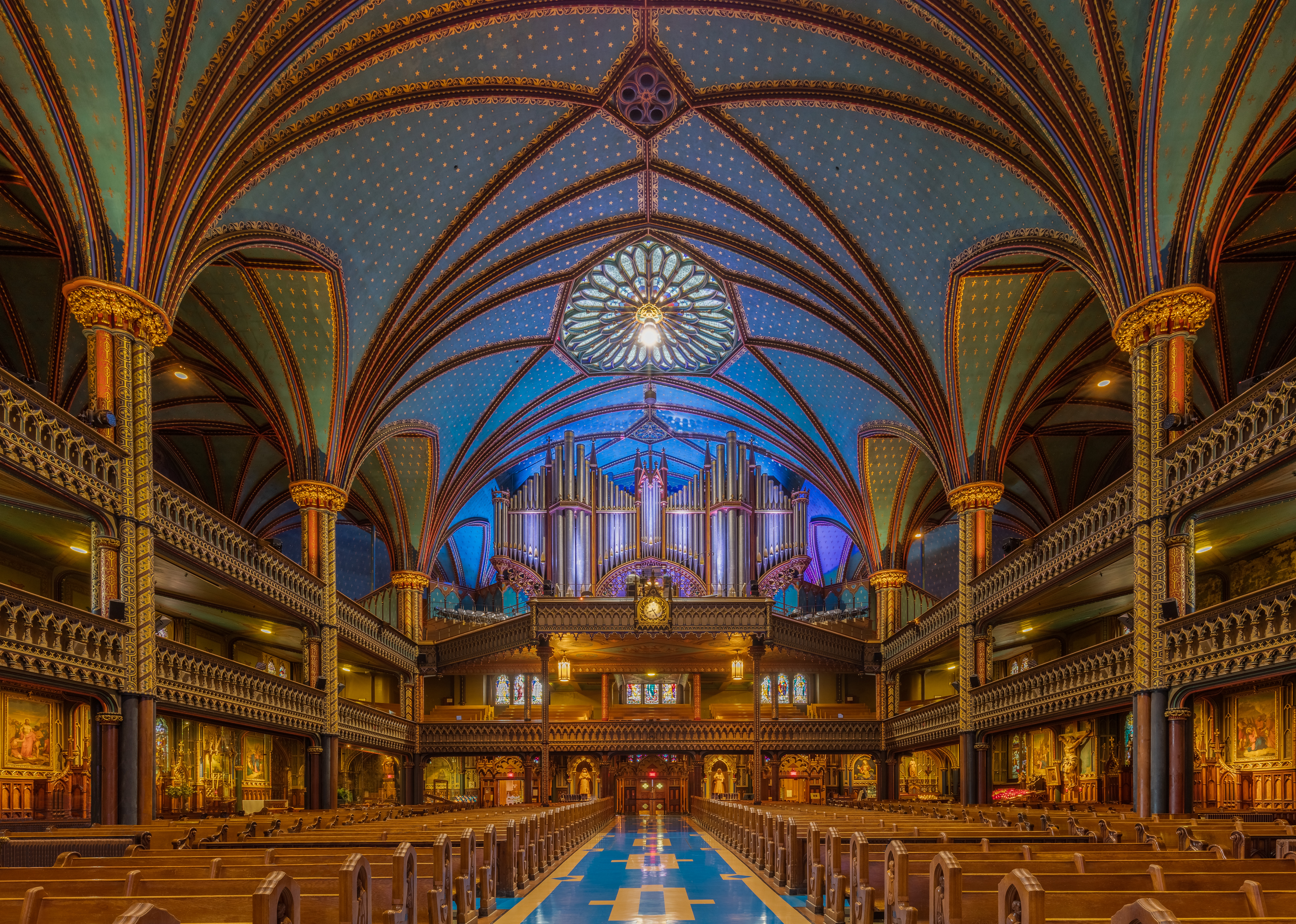
The interior of the basilica, looking towards the main doors, with the 1891 Casavant organ above. The sanctuary was completed in 1830.

The interior took much longer, and Victor Bourgeau, who also worked on Montreal's Mary, Queen of the World Cathedral, worked on it from 1872 to 1879. Stonemason John Redpath was a major participant in the construction of the church. The sanctuary originally hosted a large canopy, but because it caused a lighting effect that would blind the congregation, the interior designs were reworked by Bourgeau and Victor Rousselot, the priest at that time. They were inspired by the Sainte-Chapelle in Paris, with gold leaf motifs paired with brightly painted columns.

Because of the splendour and grand scale of the church, a more intimate chapel, named Chapelle du Sacré-Cœur (Chapel of the Sacred Heart), was built behind it, along with some offices and a sacristy. It was completed in 1888. Casavant Frères began constructing a new 32-foot pipe organ at the church in 1886, which was completed in 1891. It was notably the first organ with adjustable-combination pedals to be operated by electricity.

Arson destroyed the Chapelle du Sacré-Cœur on December 7, 1978. It was rebuilt with the first two levels reproduced from old drawings and photographs, with modern vaulting and reredos, and an immense bronze altarpiece by Quebec sculptor Charles Daudelin.

Notre-Dame Church was raised to the status of a minor basilica by Pope John Paul II in 1982. It was designated a National Historic Site of Canada in 1989.

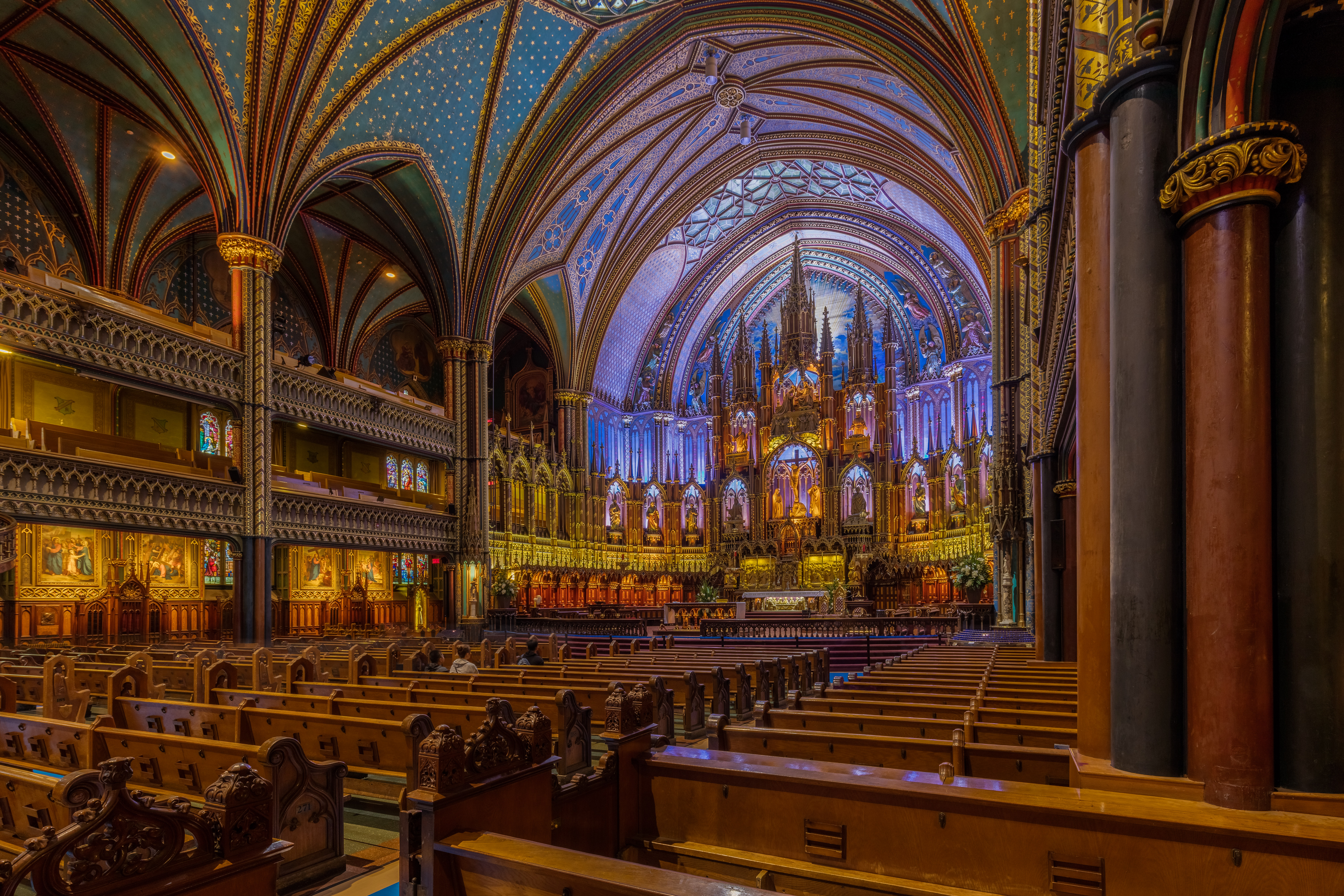
A different perspective of the interior, showing the sanctuary and high altar.

On May 31, 2000, the provincial state funeral for former Montreal Canadiens superstar Maurice "Rocket" Richard was held in front of thousands, both inside and outside the Basilica. On October 3, 2000, future prime minister Justin Trudeau gave his eulogy just steps from the High Altar during the state funeral of Pierre Trudeau, his father and Canada's 15th prime minister.

Notre-Dame Basilica was the setting for the wedding of Celine Dion and René Angélil on December 17, 1994. It also hosted the funeral service for Angélil on January 22, 2016.

In the summer of 2014, the French collector Pierre-Jean Chalençon displayed a variety of artifacts that belonged to Napoleon Bonaparte. These items included clothing, weapons, and furniture, and were on display in the crypt on the basilica.

In April 2019, following the Notre-Dame de Paris fire, Montreal's Notre-Dame announced that it would accept donations to aid in the Paris cathedral's reconstruction.

On March 23, 2024, the state funeral of Brian Mulroney, Canada's 18th prime minister, was held at the Basilica.

=== Restoration ===
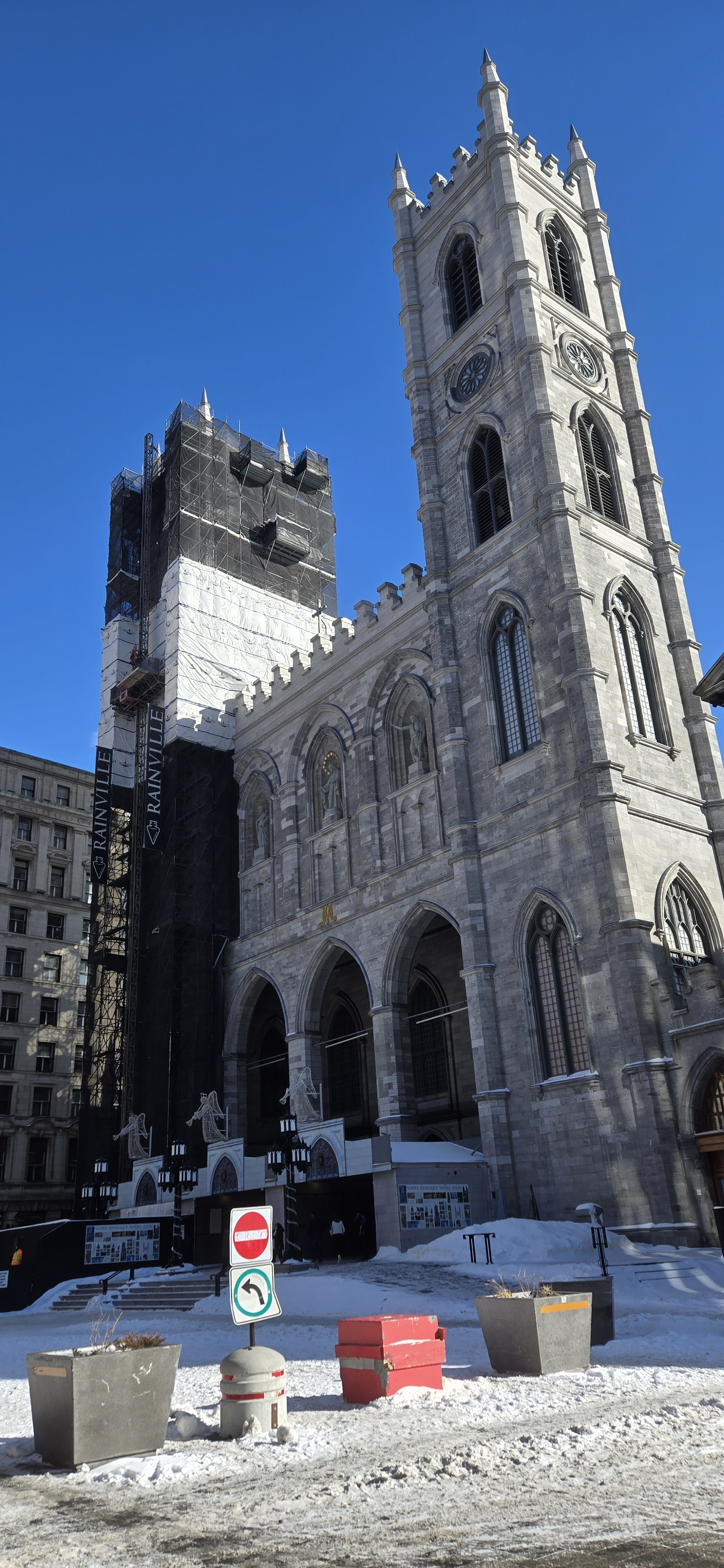
The basilica undergoing restoration in 2026

An investigation in 2017 found much of the upper stonework to be deteriorating. Restoration work on the cathedral began in 2020. The project was estimated to cost $50 million and take over a decade. As of 2026, the first two phases of the project are complete out of a total of six phases.

== Bells ==
Both towers have bells, the West Tower (La Persévérance), has a bourdon bell nicknamed Jean-Baptiste, cast in John Dod Ward's Eagle Foundry in 1848. Jean-Baptiste weighs 10,900 kg and tolls only on special occasions such as funerals, great church festivals and Christmas Eve. The East Tower (La Temperance), houses a ten-bell carillon from the same foundry on May 24, 1842.

== Public access ==
The basilica offers musical programming of choral and organ performances. It is a tradition among many Montrealers to attend the annual performance of Handel's Messiah every Christmas.

More than 11 million people visit Notre-Dame every year, only one million fewer than Notre-Dame de Paris.

== Organists ==
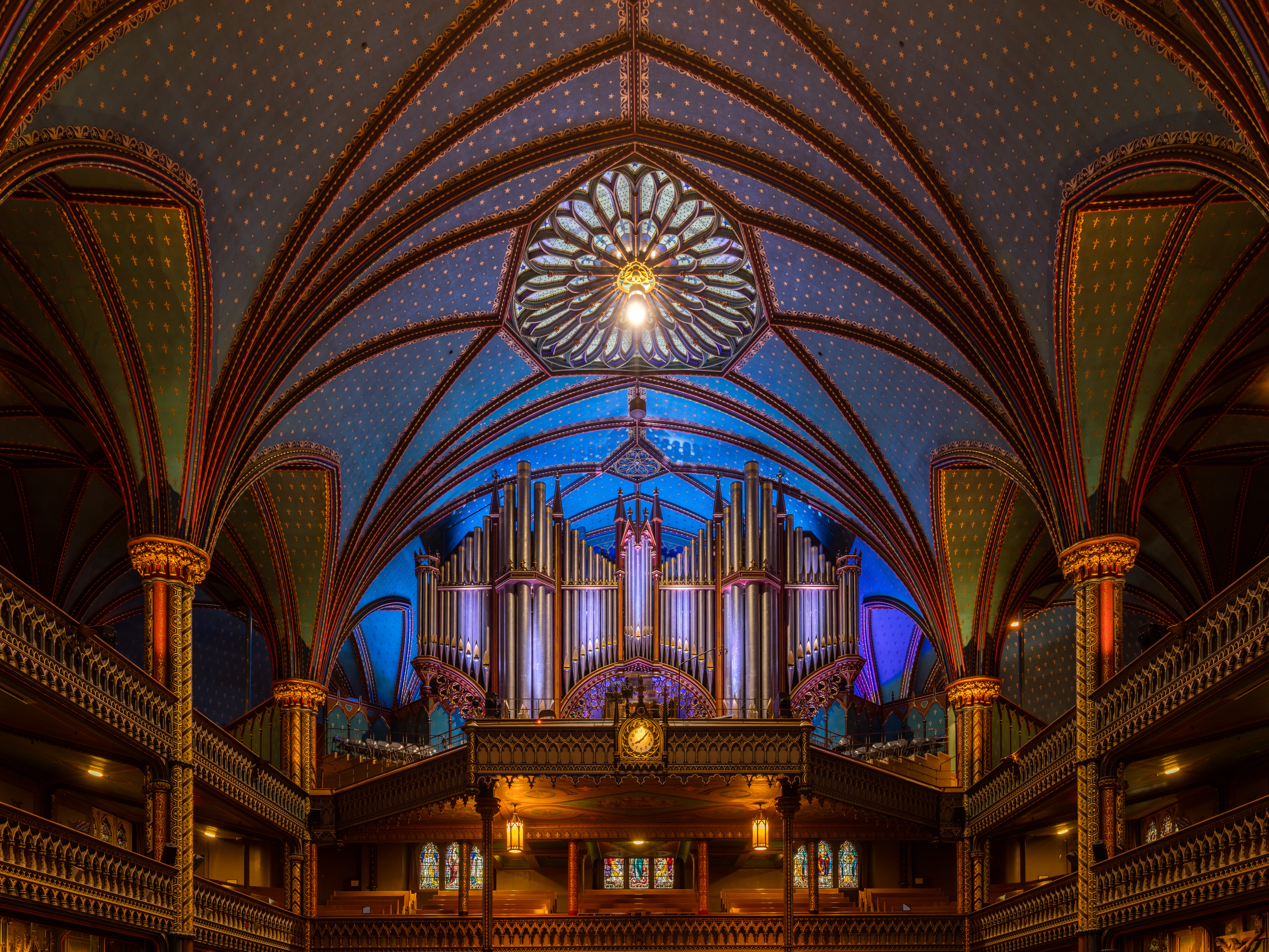
The pipe organ for the basilica

- Jean Girard (1725–1765)
- Guillaume Mechtler (1792–1832)
- Jean-Chrysostome Brauneis II (1833–1844)
- Leonard Eglauch (1845)
- Jean-Baptiste Labelle (1849–1891)
- Alcibiade Béique (1891–1896)
- Joseph-Daniel Dussault (1896–1921, with the exception of eight months in 1916)
- August Liessens (1916)
- Benoît Poirier (1921–1954)
- Pierre Grandmaison (1973–present)

== See also ==
- Adam Charles Gustave Desmazures
- List of tallest structures built before the 20th century
