= Jean Muller =

Luxembourgish classical pianist

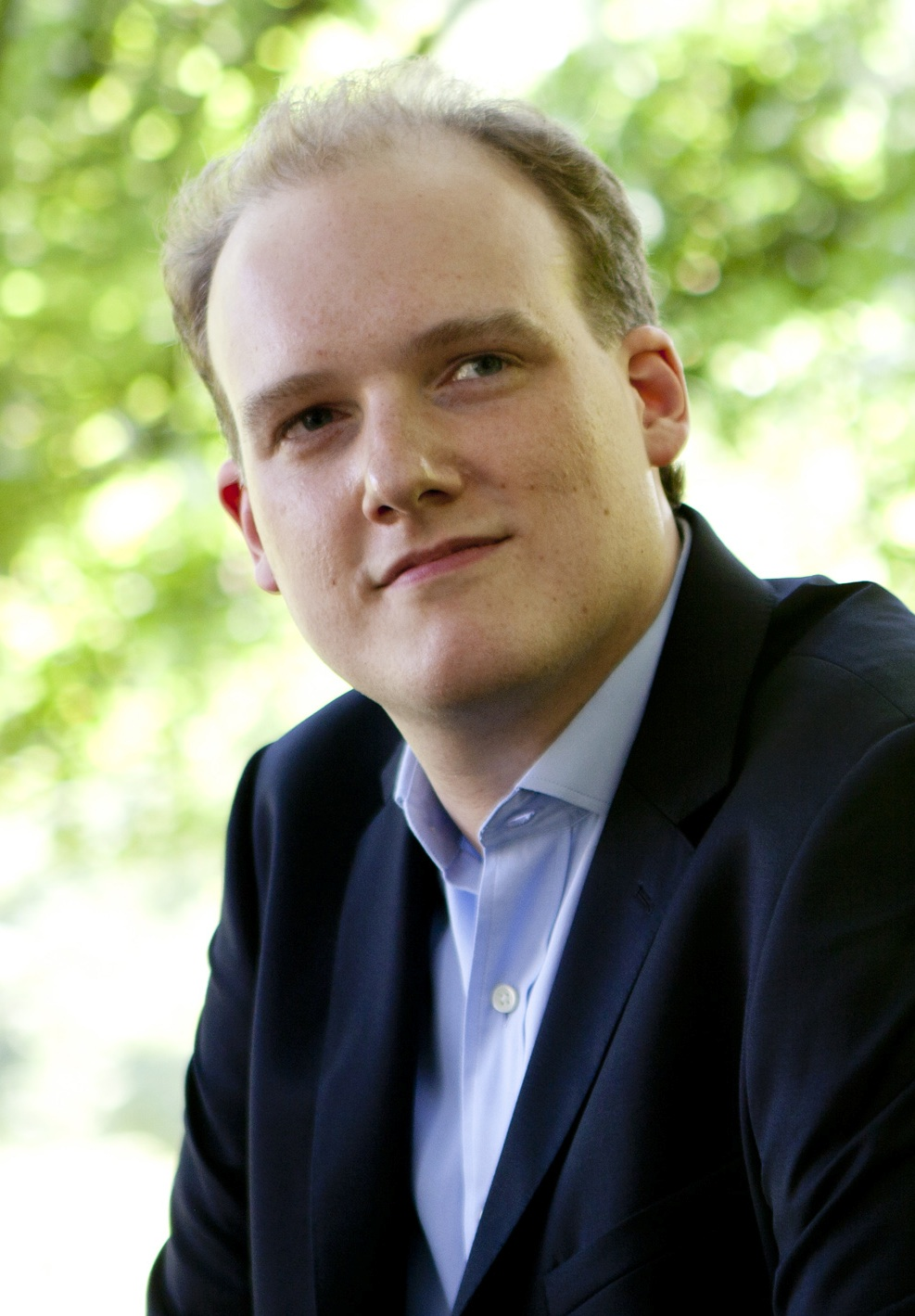
Jean Muller, Luxembourg (2011)

Jean Muller (born 11 December 1979) is a Luxembourgish classical pianist. He has received several international awards, performed worldwide, and made several recordings.

== Education ==
Jean Muller was born in Luxembourg City, the son of Gary Muller, a piano teacher. He was only six when he had his first piano lessons at the Conservatoire de Luxembourg. At 15, he spent a semester with Teofils Bikis in Riga, Latvia, before continuing his studies in Brussels, Paris, and Munich, with Gerhard Oppitz and Michael Schäfer, among others. He also received guidance from Anne Queffélec, Leon Fleisher, Janos Starker and Fou Ts'ong.

== Career ==
Muller has performed widely across Europe and beyond both in concert halls and at music festivals. In addition to solo performances, he frequently plays with the Bavarian State Orchestra, the Münchner Symphoniker and the Luxembourg Philharmonic Orchestra. He has worked with many renowned conductors including Frédéric Chaslin, Zubin Mehta and Bramwell Tovey. He has performed all of Beethoven's 32 piano sonatas in concert.

== Awards ==
In 1999 at Bratislava, Muller was a laureate of the Tribune Internationale des Jeunes Interprètes, organized by the European Broadcasting Union on behalf of UNESCO.

In 2004, he received the first prize at three French piano competitions in Arcachon, Vanves (Jean Françaix) and Brive (Francis Poulenc).

In 2007, Grand Duke Henri of Luxembourg elevated Jean Muller to the rank of Knight of the Civil and Military Order of Merit of Adolph of Nassau in gratitude for his performances during official state visits.

== Assessment ==
Muller's Chopin Recital album was given Gramophone's Critic Choice award. Critic Bryce Morrison stated, "Backed by a savage technical voltage, he lifts you far above studio conditions or the polished if politely impersonal expertise too familiar from the competition circuit." The president of the Concours Poulenc jury, Jean-Claude Pennetier, said, "Everything is there: fingers, head and heart." Muller's recordings have also earned excellent reviews in the specialized press such as International Piano, BBC Music Magazine, Fono Forum, Classica, Diapason, Pizzicato, etc.

== Discography ==
- 2010: Jean Muller Chopin Recital, Ballades 1–4, Mazurkas in A Minor Op 17 No 4, C Major Op 68 No 1, A Minor Op 67 No 4, Waltz in D Flat Major, Waltz in A Flat Major, Largo in E Flat Major and Polonaise in F Sharp Minor Op 44. SADC Fondamenta FON-1005008.
- 2007: Jean Muller plays Stéphane Blet, 6 Sonatas; Suite érotique. Polymnie CD POL - 150 544
- 2006: Jean Muller – Chopin, Sonata No 3, 4; Impromptus; Barcarolle; Polonaise op. 53. Hybrid SACD Turtle Records TRSA 0027
- 2004: Jean Muller – Liszt, Chopin, Civitareale, Françaix, Franz Liszt: Sonata in B minor, Spanish Rhapsody; Frédéric Chopin: Nocturnes op. 27, Ballade No 4; Walter Civitareale: 3 Miniatures; Jean Françaix: 5 Encores. CD JCH-Productions JCH 2004 / 02
- 2003: Attila Kereztesi, Jean Muller – Béla Bartók, Béla Bartók: Sonatas & Rhapsodies for violin and piano; Romanian Dances, with Attila Keresztesi, Violin. CD JCH-Productions JCH 2003 / 02
- 1999: Jean Muller – [piano], Igor Stravinsky: Petruchka; Wolfgang Amadeus Mozart: Sonata KV 576 in D major; Ludwig van Beethoven: Sonata op. 57 in F minor - Appassionata; Carl Czerny: Variationen über den Sehnsuchtswalzer; Mily Balakirew: Islamey. CD JCH-Productions JCH 1999 / 09
- 1997: Jean Muller – Pianistic Fireworks, Sergei Rachmaninov: Sonata No 2; Frédéric Chopin: Berceuse, Barcarolle; Franz Liszt: Racószy-Marsch, Feux Follets; Paul Hindemith: Suite 1922. CD JCH-Productions JCH 1997 / 12
