= Stéphane Blet =

French pianist and composer (1969–2022)

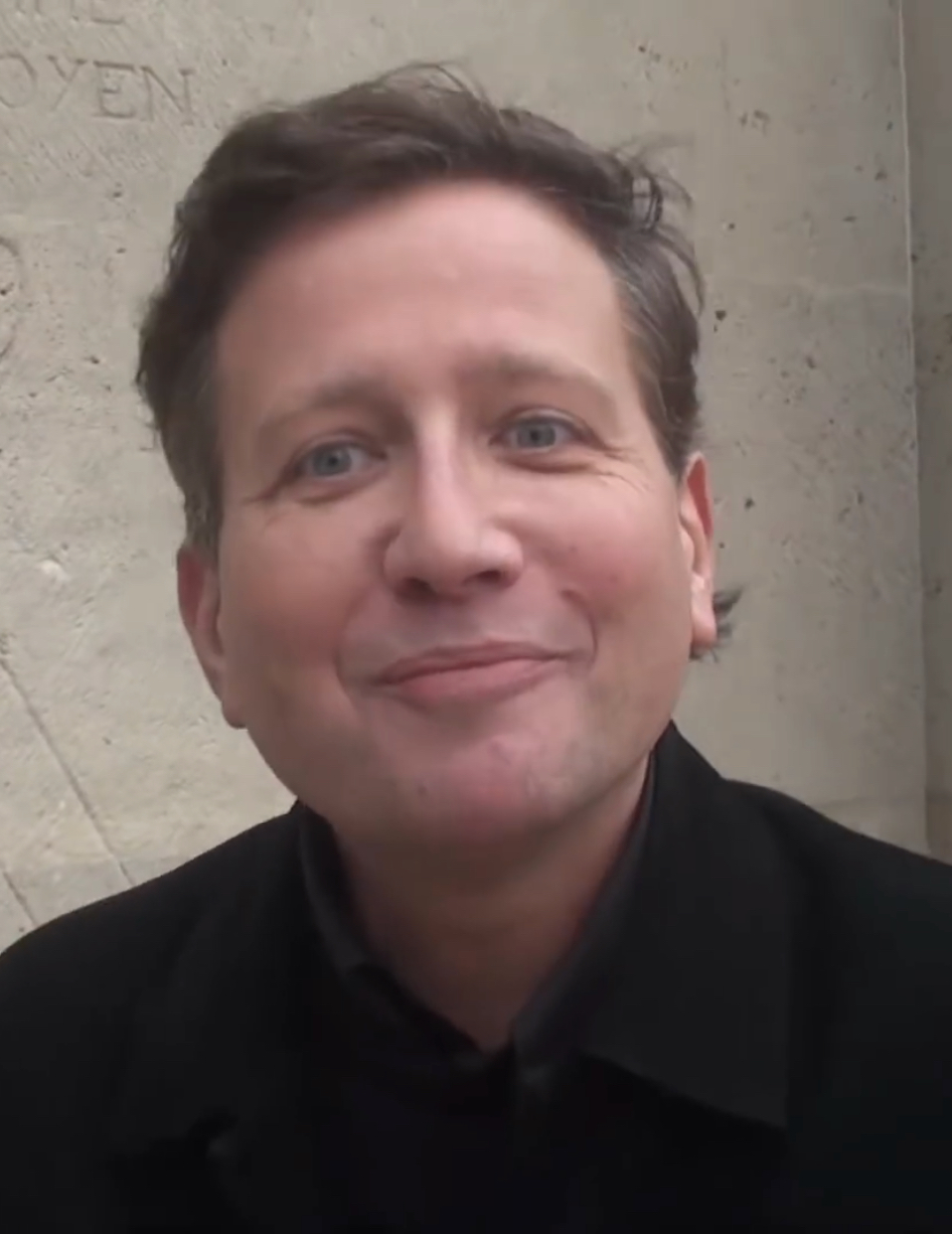
Blet in 2017

Stéphane Blet (9 March 1969 – 7 January 2022) was a French classical pianist and composer.

== Life and career ==
Born in Paris, France, Blet was a disciple of the great American pianist Byron Janis who discovered an exceptional talent in him and invited him to New York. He was also a young assistant of Vladimir Horowitz. In 1986, he began an international concert career.

His recitals at the Salle Gaveau and at the Théâtre des Champs-Élysées earned him the adulation of the public, as during his "Franz Liszt marathon" in February 1987 where he was applauded for more than thirty minutes, which made the music critic Pierre Petit say: "Stéphane Blet is more than just piano, it's the music itself."

At the age of fifteen, he recorded his first album, exclusively devoted to Franz Liszt. He was also a concert performer from the age of fifteen.

One year later he signed with Philips Classics, for whom he recorded two new CDs, still dedicated to the Hungarian composer, including the Piano Sonata in B minor, selection of the meilleurs CD Diapason 1989, who led André Boucourechliev to write: "From his body to body with the work is born a superb architecture, chanted in turn by majesty and the most intense lyricism. And what a sound! We appreciate the true musician and his wonderful understanding of the work... we forget everything to devote ourselves to emotion... it is the state of grace!". As for Carlo Maria Giulini, he emphasized "an amazing technique and the most beautiful piano sound".

Blet composed more than 300 works for piano, violin, orchestra, human voice, published by the Alphonse Leduc publishing house, Lemoine, Combre, Zurfluh, Durand-Eschig, Lafitan, Fertile plaine, Soldano, performed and recorded by pianists such as Cyprien Katsaris, Alexandre Paley, İdil Biret, Evelina Borbei, Natalia Sitolenko, Jean Muller.

In 1993, he created the event by transcribing the monumental Liszt's Faust Symphony, which earned him several awards, including one from the Franz Liszt Association. He also composed a large cycle of Turkish and Ottoman Rhapsodies and was decorated in 1996 by the Turkish government for this work.

Blet participated to the jury of the École normale de musique de Paris, before being appointed a professor in 2001. He also chaired a large number of international competitions, including the Istanbul International Piano Competition in 2013.

He was also the author of about fifteen musicological works about the works of Frédéric Chopin, Erik Satie, Franz Liszt, and Robert Schumann, ainsi que d'une méthode de piano, Le Voyage Magique (after an American concept) published at éditions Leduc.

For twenty-five years Blet was vice-president of the Académie du disque lyrique and created the "Grand Orphée d'Or Leyla Gencer" prize in 2010, in homage to the great Turkish singer.

He died from a fall in Geneva, Switzerland on 7 January 2022, at the age of 52.

== Politics ==
In 2017, Gaël Brustier revealed that he is close to Alain Soral et "l’un des conférenciers engagés dans la Masonic conspiracy theories denonciation". In one month, his lecture was viewed 77,000 times on YouTube in August alone. Stéphane Blet did another "repentant" interview viewed over 260,000 times. He makes an appearance in La France maçonnique, a film directed by Paul-Éric Blanrue and Julien Teil, with Dieudonné, Jean-Yves Le Gallou, Emmanuel Ratier and Pierre Hillard.

== Selected discography ==
=== As pianist ===
- Franz Liszt : Sonate en si mineur, Méphisto Valse n°|1, Vallée d'Obermann, 1 CD, Philips Classics, 1989 (reissued in 2001)
- Favorite Encores, 1CD, Forlane, 1996
- Hommage à Horowitz, 1 CD, Marcal Classics, 2008
- Frédéric Chopin's Complete 19 Nocturnes, 2 CDs, Saphir Productions, 2008
- Erik Satie: Du Chat noir à la Rose + Croix , 1 CD, Saphir Productions, 2006
- Liszt: de Faust à Mephisto, 1 CD, Polygram, 2002
- L'Art de Stéphane Blet, 6 CD, Marcal, 2005
- Mussorgsky, Schumann: Tableaux d'une exposition/ Kreisleriana, 1 CD, Marcal Classics, 2009
- Schubert, Brahms… : Four hands piano (with Etsuko Hirose), 1 CD, Axes Recordings, 2012
- "Erik Satie, Les mémoires d'un amnésique. Gymnopédies, Gnossiennes, Valzs. With Daniel Prévost. 1 CD Calliope. CAL 1631.
- Trésors du piano russe. Stéphane Blet. Rachmaninoff, Moussorgsky, Scriabin... 1 CD Calliope. CAL 1636.
- "Mozart & Beethoven", Sonatas, Fantasies... 1 CD Calliope. CAL 1635
- "Karnaval". Stéphane Blet plays Schumann. CD Calliope.

=== As composer ===
- Hommage à Stéphane Blet, by Morgane Dupuy, Alexander Paley, 1 CD, Marcal, 2008
- Jean Muller plays Stéphane Blet, 1 CD, "Polymnie", 2007
- Docteur Faust: Stéphane Blet's works for piano vol. 1, by Evelina Borbei, 1 CD, Maguelone, 2002
- Insomnies, by Natalia Sitolenko, 1 CD, Marcal Classics, 2004
- Fantaisie ottomane et œuvres pour piano seul, by Isabelle Oehmichen and Weiner Chamber Orchestra (conducted by Richard Weninger), 1 CD, Marcal Classics, 2005

=== Composer and interpreter ===
- Figure libre, Éditions Kontre Kulture

== Publications ==
- 3 Préludes Op. 5, for piano. (Éd. Combre-Lemoine)
- Préludio Op. 5b, for four hands piano. (Lemoine. "Les plaisirs du piano à 4 mains, vol.3)
- Sonate Op 6 n°.1, for piano. (Éd. Combre-Lemoine)
- Scherzo Op 7, for piano. (Éd. Durand-Eschig)
- 3 Esquisses nocturnes Op.8, for piano. (Éd. Combre-Lemoine)
- Sonate Op. 9 n°.2, for piano. (Éd. Combre-Lemoine)
- Eclipse Op. 10, for piano. (Éd. Combre-Lemoine)
- Volutes Op. 14, for piano. (Éd. Combre-Lemoine)
- Vertiges Op. 15, for piano. (Éd. Combre-Lemoine)
- Le Songe de Vénus Op. 16, for piano. (Éd. Combre-Lemoine)
- Microcosme I Op. 17, for piano. (Éd. Combre-Lemoine)
- Rhapsodie Turque Op. 18 n.1, for piano. (Éd. Combre-Lemoine)
- Mélodie Ottomane Op. 19, for piano. (Éd. Alphonse Leduc)
- Rhapsodie Turque Op. 20 n.3, for piano. (Éd. Combre-Lemoine)
- Rhapsodie Turque Op. 21 n.4, for piano. (Éd. Combre-Lemoine)
- Mélodie populaire Orientale Op. 22, for piano. (Éd. Alphonse Leduc)
- Magie de Lumière Op. 23, for piano. (Éd. Combre-Lemoine)
- Antalya Op. 25, for piano. (Éd. Combre-Lemoine)
- Erzurum, Op. 23, for piano. (Éd. Fertile Plaine)
- Les Larmes du Bosphore (Rhapsodie Turque n.9) Op. 27, for piano. (Éd. Fertile Plaine)
- L'Album de Raphaël Op. 29. 5 pieces for piano. (Éd. Combre-Lemoine)
- Ottomania Op. 29b, for 2 pianos (8 hands) or 4 hands poiano piano. (Éd. Combre-Lemoine. Collection "Fac- similé")
- Fantaisie Ottomane pour deux pianos Op. 29. (Éd. Combre-Lemoine. Collection "Fac-similé)
- Sonate Op. 31 n°.3 "Docteur Faust" for piano. (Éd. Combre-Lemoine. Collection "Fac-simile")
- Petites Ballades Orientales Op. 32, for piano. (Éd. Combre-Lemoine)
- Suite Op. 35 for piano. (Éd. Jonaphil-Lemoine)
- Toccata Op. 36 for piano. (Éd. Jonaphil-Lemoine)
- 2 Études Op. 38 for piano. (Éd. Zurfluh-Robert Martin. "Collection Spéciale Concours")
- Insomnies Op. 38b, for piano. (Éd. Pierre Lafitan)
- Sonate Op. 40 n+.4 "Renaissance" for piano. (Éd. Alphonse Leduc)
- Trente Poèmes microcosmiques Op. 41, for piano. Volume 1, n.1 à 10. (Éd. Alphonse Leduc)
- Trente Poèmes microcosmiques Op. 41, for piano. Volume 2, n.11 à 20. (Éd. Alphonse Leduc)
- Trente Poèmes micro cosmiques Op. 41, for piano. Volume 3, n°.21 ti 30. (Éd. Alphonse Leduc)
- Les Classiques du Joker (without opus). 10 pieces for piano. (Éd. Alphonse Leduc)
- Improvisation Op. 45 n°.1, for piano. (Éd. Pierre Lafitan)
- Improvisation Op. 45 n°.2, for piano. (Éd. Pierre Lafitan)
- Improvisation Op. 45 n°.3, for piano. (Éd. Pierre Lafitan)
- Deux Esquisses Enfantines Op 48, for piano. (Éd. Pierre Lafitan)
- Jeux, 7 pièces (without opus) for piano. (Éd. Soldano)
- Hard- score (without opus) for piano. (Éd. Jonaphil-Lemoine)
- Quintessence (s) (without opus) for piano. (Éd. Jonaphil-Lemoine)
- Song Book (without opus). Chansons et Musiques de Films, vol.1. (R. Harmon Prod. Series "Fac-simile")
- Tunnel (without opus), for double basse solo. (Ed. Fertile Plaine)
- Masques Op. 52, for piano. (Éd. Zurfluh-Robert Martin)
- Balade pour Raphaël Op. 55, for piano. (Éd. Jonaphil-Lemoine)
- For Children (hors opus). 13 pieces for piano. (Éd. Combre-Lemoine)
- Flamme sombre Op. 60 n°.1. Mélodie pour Mezzo soprano et Piano. (Éd. Zurfluh-Robert Martin)
- Sonate Op. 62 n°.5, "Rédemption" for piano. (Éd. Alphonse Leduc)
- Neiges Op. 63 pour solo violin. (Ed Combre-Lemoine. Series directed by Gérard Poulet)
- Improvisation Op. 81b n°.4 for piano (Éd. Pierre Lafitan)
- 4 Mélodies after Baudelaire's Les Fleurs du Mal Op. 100, for mezzo soprano and piano. (Éd. Combre-Lemoine)
- 4 Mélodies sur des Poètes contemporains Op.103, for mezzo soprano and piano. (Éd. Fertile Plaine)
- Deux pièces en forme d'Étude; Op. 103b, for piano. (Éd. Soldano)
- Spirale, Op. 105b for a cappella mixed choir. (Jonaphil-Lemoine publisher)
- Poème (without opus) for a cappella mezzo soprano. (Éd. Fertile Plaine)
- Suite Érotique Op. 110, for piano. (Fertile Plaine publisher)
- Palestine !, for piano. (Éd. Fertile Plaine)
- Quintessence (s) without opus, for piano. (Éd. Jonaphil-Lemoine)
- Aquarelles (without opus), for piano. (Éd. Zurfluh-Robert Martin)
- Valse "à l'ancienne" (without opus), for piano. (Éd. Pierre Lafitan)
- Trilogie (hors opus) for piano. (Éd. Jonaphil-Lemoine)
- Le Miroir Brisé Op. 114, for piano. (Éd. Alphonse Leduc)
- Éternité Op. 120b, 2 pieces for solo cello. (Éd. Zurfluh-Robert Martin)
- Sonata Op. 135 n°.6 Le Baiser de Satan, for piano. (Éd. Combre-Lemoine)
- Désir et mépris Op. 135 n°.1, melody for mezzo soprano and piano. (Éd. Fertile Plaine)
- Etreinte Op. 140 for solo violon. (Ed. Fertile Plaine)
- In mémoriam Frida Kahlo Op.141, for piano. (Éd. Combre-Lemoine)
- Piano Concerto Op. 142 "Dracula". Reduction for 2 pianos by the author. (Éd. Combre-Lemoine).
- Improvisation Op. 150b n°.5 (Éd. Pierre Lafitan)
- Après... Étude pour Violon seul Op. 152 (Ed. Alphonse Leduc)
- Les Rites d'Eleusis: Saturne, for piano. (Éd. Combre-Lemoine)
- Étude-Impromptu Op. 167, for piano. (Éd. Fertile Plaine)
- Anecdote Op. 171a, for piano. (Éd. Fertile Plaine)
- Improvisation Op. 173 n°.6, Sans espoir?, for piano. (Éd. Pierre Lafitan)
- Quatre Poèmes pour la Jeunesse, (Éd. Zurfluh-Robert Martin)
- Libellules, for piano. (Éd. Fertil Plaine)
- Improvisation Op. 179 n°.8 Sursum Corda for piano. (Éd. Pierre Lafitan)
- Le Vampire Op 180 n°.1. Melody Op. 180 n°.1, after Charles Baudelaire's poem. (Éd. Fertile Plaine)
- L'Invitation au Voyage Op. 180 n°.2, after Charles Baudelaire. (Éd. Fertile Plaine)
- Improvisation n°.9 for piano. (Éd. Pierre Lafitan)
- Improvisation n°.10 "Nightmare". (Éd. Pierre Lafitan)
- Improvisation n°.11 "Ether". (Éd. Pierre Lafitan)
- Sonate Op. 183 n°.7 "Rituel", for piano. (Éd. Fertile Plaine)
- Prélude Op. 183b for solo violin. (Ed. Fertile Plaine)
- Improvisation Op. 184 for solo violin. (Ed. Fertile Plaine)
- Improvisation Op. 189 n°.7 "Résonance (s)", for piano. (Éd. Pierre Lafitan)
- Sonate Op. 200 n°.8 "Hermès Trismegiste", for piano. (Éd Combre-Lemoine, collection "Fac-simile")
- Sonata Op. 202 n°.1 "Rosicrucienne" for violin and piano. (Ed. Fertile Plaine)
- Klavierstűcke Op. 211, for piano. (Éd. Fertile Plaine)
- Perpetuum mobile Op. 212, for piano. (Éd. Fertile Plaine)
- Trois Rêves Op. 251, for piano. "A Gulsin Onay". (Éd. Soldano)
- Huit Chorals Lunaires Op. 253, for piano. (Éd. Fertile Plaine)
- Sonate Op. 254 N° 9 "Re-turn", for piano. (Éd. Soldano)
- Sonate Op. 255 N°10 "RésiStances", for piano. (Éd. Soldano)
- Sonate Op. 418 N°11 "Horus". (Éd. Soldano)

Transcriptions:

- Albinoni-Blet: Adagio, for piano. (Éd. Pierre Lafitan)
- Mahler-Blet: Adagietto (excerpts from the 5thSymphonie), for piano. (Éd. Combre-Lemoine)
- Liszt-Blet: Faust Symphonie for Piano. (Éd. Combre-Lemoine, "Collection Fac simile)

Cadences:

- Cadences pour les concertos pour Piano K 466 et K 466 by W.A.Mozart. (Éd. Combre-Lemoine)

Éditions de travail et Révisions de Stéphane Blet :

- Liszt à votre portée, 7 Pièces pour Piano. Œuvres originales annotées et doigtés par Stéphane Blet. (Éd. Combre-Lemoine)
- Liszt's Rhapsodie Hongroise n°.2. Nouvelle révision et annotations de Stéphane Blet. (Éd. Combre-Lemoine)
- Liszt's Rêve d'Amour, Nocturne n.3 pour piano. Annotations et doigtés par Stéphane Blet. Édition recommandée par l'Association Française Franz Liszt. (Éd. Combre-Lemoine)
- Chopin's Valse K I B n.11 (n°.17, in L minor). Annotations et doigtés de Stéphane Blet. (Éd. Combre-Lemoine)

Essays on occultism

- Traité herméneutique: Trésors occultes de la Franc-Maçonnerie, 2010, Cap Béar Éditions, ISBN 978-2350660738
- Sous le voile de l'occultisme, Éd. Amalthée, 2006

Essays on music

- Introduction à l'art pianistique, followed by Schumann ou les déchirements de la double personnalité, Zurfluh-Robert Martin (2006), ISBN 2877500985
- L'art d'interpréter les mazurkas de Chopin, éditions Jonaphil-Lemoine
- La Faust Symphonie de Franz Liszt, histoire d'un chef-d'œuvre négligé, Paris Combre-Lemoine, cop. 2005
- L'énigme Satie, éditions Combre-Lemoine

== Bibliography ==
- La France maçonnique (Apocalypse France, saison 1), 2015, by Paul-Éric Blanrue.
