= James O'Donnell (architect) =

Irish-American architect

Coordinates: 45°30′16.15″N 73°33′22.55″W

- Born: 1774; County Wexford, Ireland
- Died: January 28, 1830 (aged 55–56); Montreal
- Occupation: Architect
- Buildings: Notre-Dame Basilica (Montreal)

James O'Donnell (1774–1830) was an Irish-American architect in New York City and Montreal.

== Biography ==
James O’Donnell was born in County Wexford, Ireland, to a wealthy family of Anglo-Irish landowners. He became an architect.

In 1812, at the age of 38, O'Donnell migrated to the United States and took up residence in New York City, where he successfully practised as an architect. His major works in that city were the Bloomingdale Insane Asylum (1818–1821, demolished c. 1892), the Fulton Market (1821–1822, demolished 1936), and Christ Church (1822–1823, destroyed by fire 1847). O’Donnell took his inspiration for the last building from the neo-Gothic style, which he favoured throughout his career. In 1817, he was elected to the American Academy of the Fine Arts in New York.

O’Donnell moved to Montreal to build the Notre-Dame Basilica from 1823 to 1829.

For some years James O’Donnell had suffered from edema, and from July 1829 his condition worsened. In November he dictated his will; at that point he decided to convert from Anglicanism to Roman Catholicism. He died shortly afterwards, on January 28, 1830. He is the only person buried in the crypt of the Basilica. O'Donnell converted to Catholicism on his deathbed, perhaps due to the realization that he might not be allowed to be buried in his church.

== Gallery ==
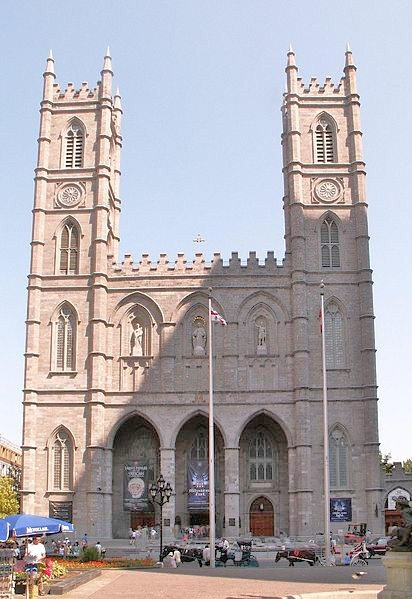
Notre-Dame Basilica (Montreal)
