= McGill station =

Montreal Metro and Réseau express métropolitain station

McGill
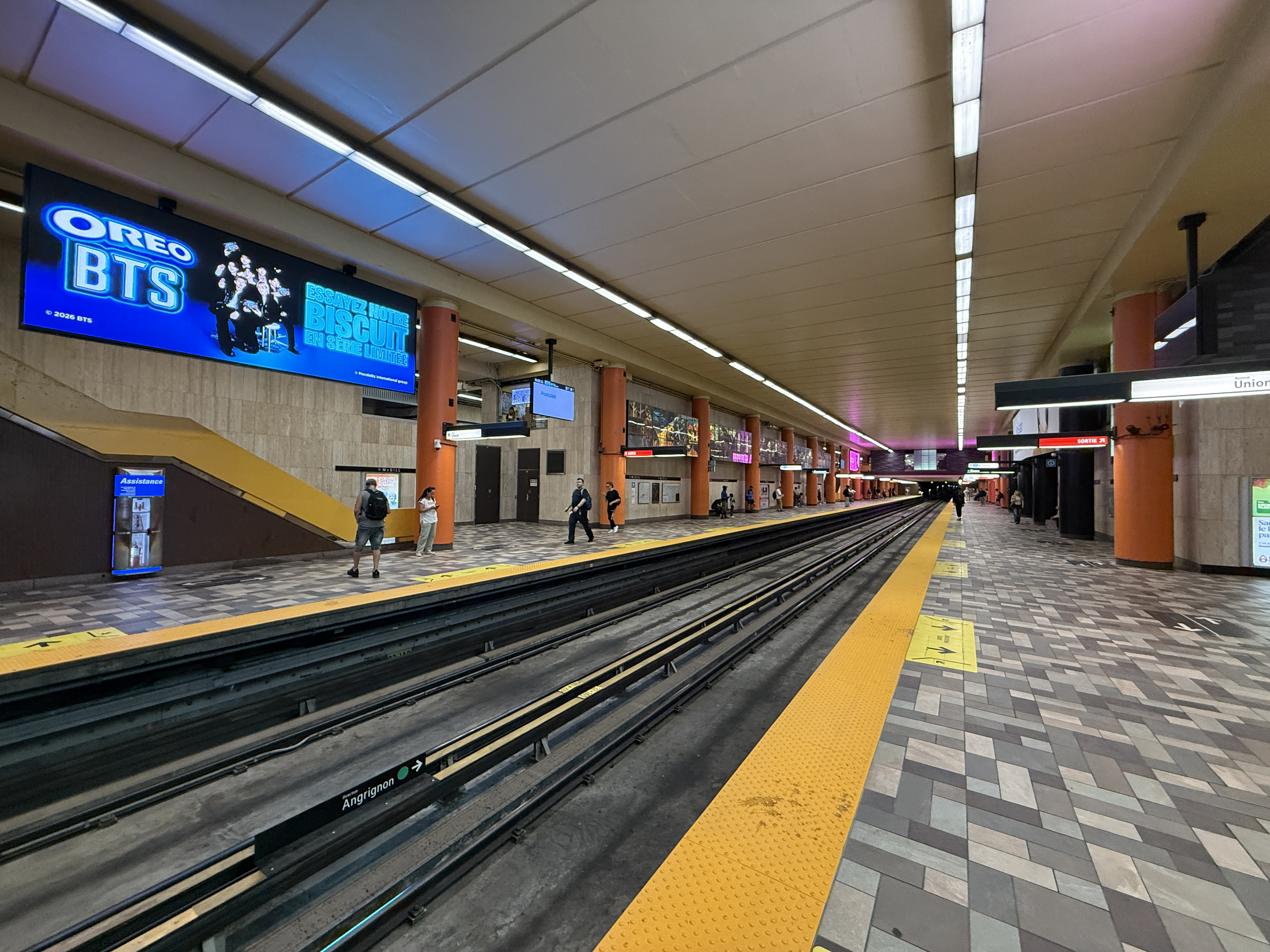
- McGill station in 2026

General information
- Location: De Maisonneuve Boulevard at University Street; Montreal, Quebec H3A 2A4; Canada
- Coordinates: 45°30′14″N 73°34′18″W
- Operator: Metro: Société de transport de Montréal; REM: Pulsar (AtkinsRéalis and Alstom)
- Platforms: Metro: 2 side platforms REM: 2 side platforms
- Tracks: Metro: 2 REM: 2
- Connections: STM bus

Construction
- Depth: 10.7 metres (35 feet 1 inch), 49th deepest REM: 10 m (32 ft 10 in)
- Accessible: Yes
- Architect: Crevier, Lemieux, Mercier and Caron

Other information
- Station code: REM: MCG
- Fare zone: ARTM: A

History
- Opened: 14 October 1966

Key dates
- 2023: Metro station became accessible
- 2025: REM station opened

Passengers
- 2024: 8,133,162 ▲6.68%
- Rank: 2 of 68

Services
| Preceding station | Montreal Metro | Following station |
|---|---|---|
| Peel toward Angrignon | Green Line | Place-des-Arts toward Honoré-Beaugrand |
| Preceding station | REM | Following station |
| Édouard-Montpetit toward Deux-Montagnes or Anse-à-l'Orme | Réseau express métropolitain | Central Station toward Brossard |
Future services
| Preceding station | REM | Following station |
|---|---|---|
| Édouard-Montpetit toward Airport | Réseau express métropolitain (opens 2027) | Central Station toward Brossard |
Location

McGill station is a Montreal Metro and Réseau express métropolitain (REM) station in the borough of Ville-Marie in the downtown core of Montreal, Quebec, Canada. The Metro station is operated by the Société de transport de Montréal (STM) and serves the Green Line. The REM station is operated by Pulsar, and is served by all REM branches.

The Metro station opened on October 14, 1966, as part of the original network of the Metro. Since November 2025, the station is also served by the Réseau express métropolitain (REM).

It is currently the second busiest station in the Metro network, as measured by number of passengers entering the system (after Berri–UQAM station). Prior to 2002, it was the busiest station in the network.

== Overview ==
Designed by Crevier, Lemieux, Mercier and Caron, it is a normal side platform station built in open cut under boul. De Maisonneuve, with two ticket halls joined by corridors that surround the platforms. The station is named after, and is located adjacent to McGill University.

The ticket halls are linked to the platforms by four stairways per platform, including the shortest escalators in the network. The station has large pillars, which were originally painted orange, but painted in beer bottle green colour in the late 1990s. In January 2010 the STM repainted the station in its original colours being orange pillars and yellow walls.

As an important part of the underground city, the station has had its mezzanine level substantially enlarged since its opening, by construction of new buildings around the station: the western end of the mezzanine was added with the construction of the Tour BNP and Eaton Centre, while the southern corridor between the ticket halls was added to link the Promenades de la Cathédrale (now known as Promenades Cathédrale) with the station.

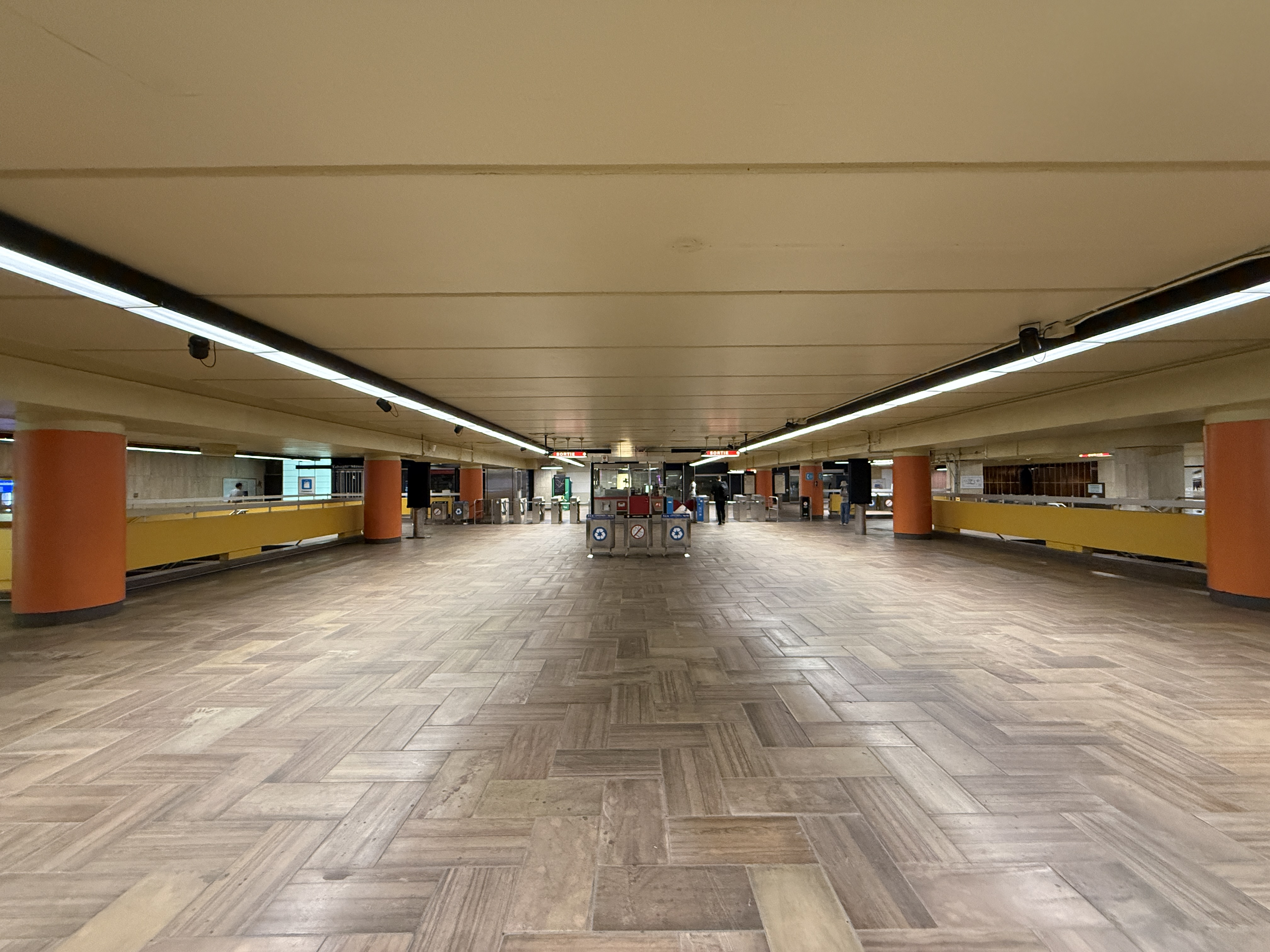
McGill station concourse. (The previous green coloured pillars can be seen in the background)

No fewer than six buildings are directly connected to the station via underground city. The station has a further six direct street-level entrances, all of which are integrated into the façades of other buildings. A seventh entrance in a separate building was added in 2023 to provide elevator access, making the station accessible.

Among this busy station's amenities include several shops and services directly in the station, including a Tim Hortons, Second Cup, a Scotiabank, two Pizza Shops, a web terminal, and MétroVision information screens which displays news, commercials, and the time till the next train. This was second station after Berri–UQAM to have them installed. At one time an "open-concept" branch of the Montreal Public Library was located next to the exit onto rue Université.

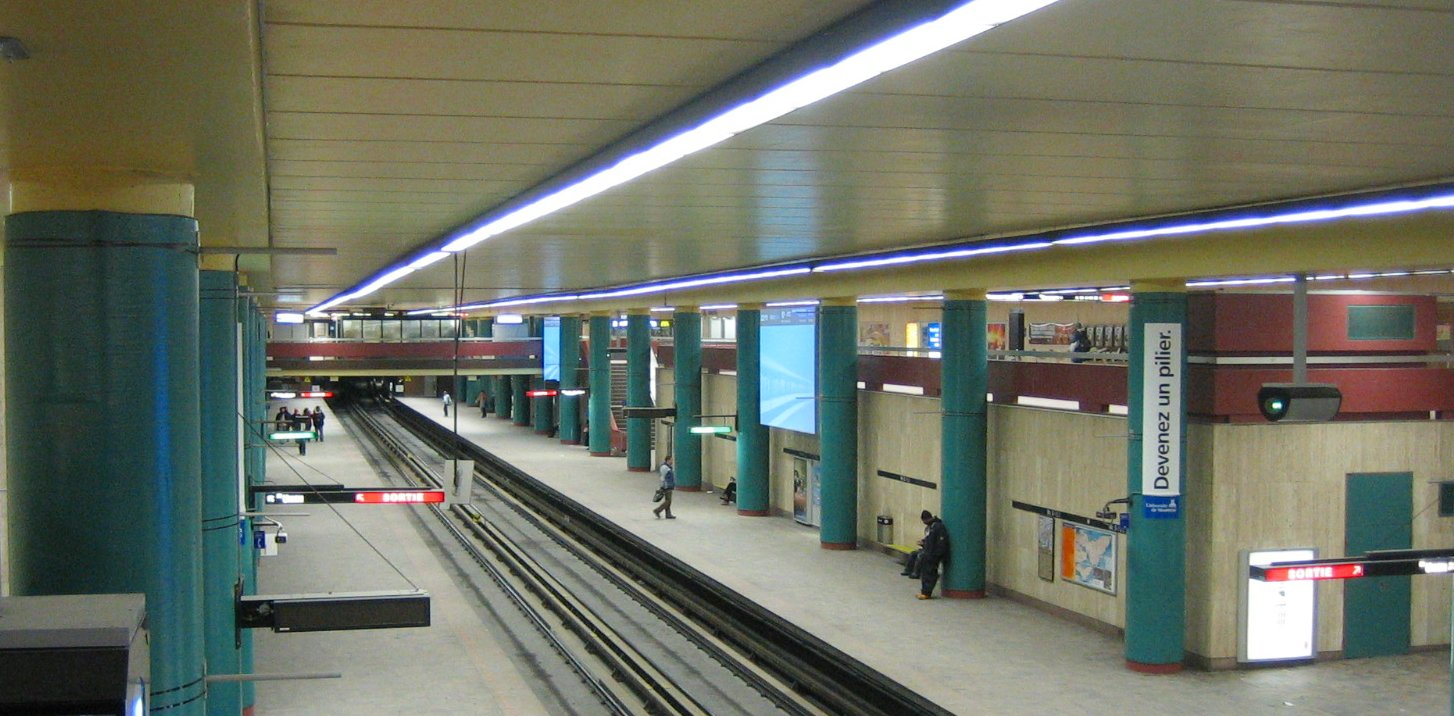
McGill station in its former colours of green and burgundy, changed in 2010.

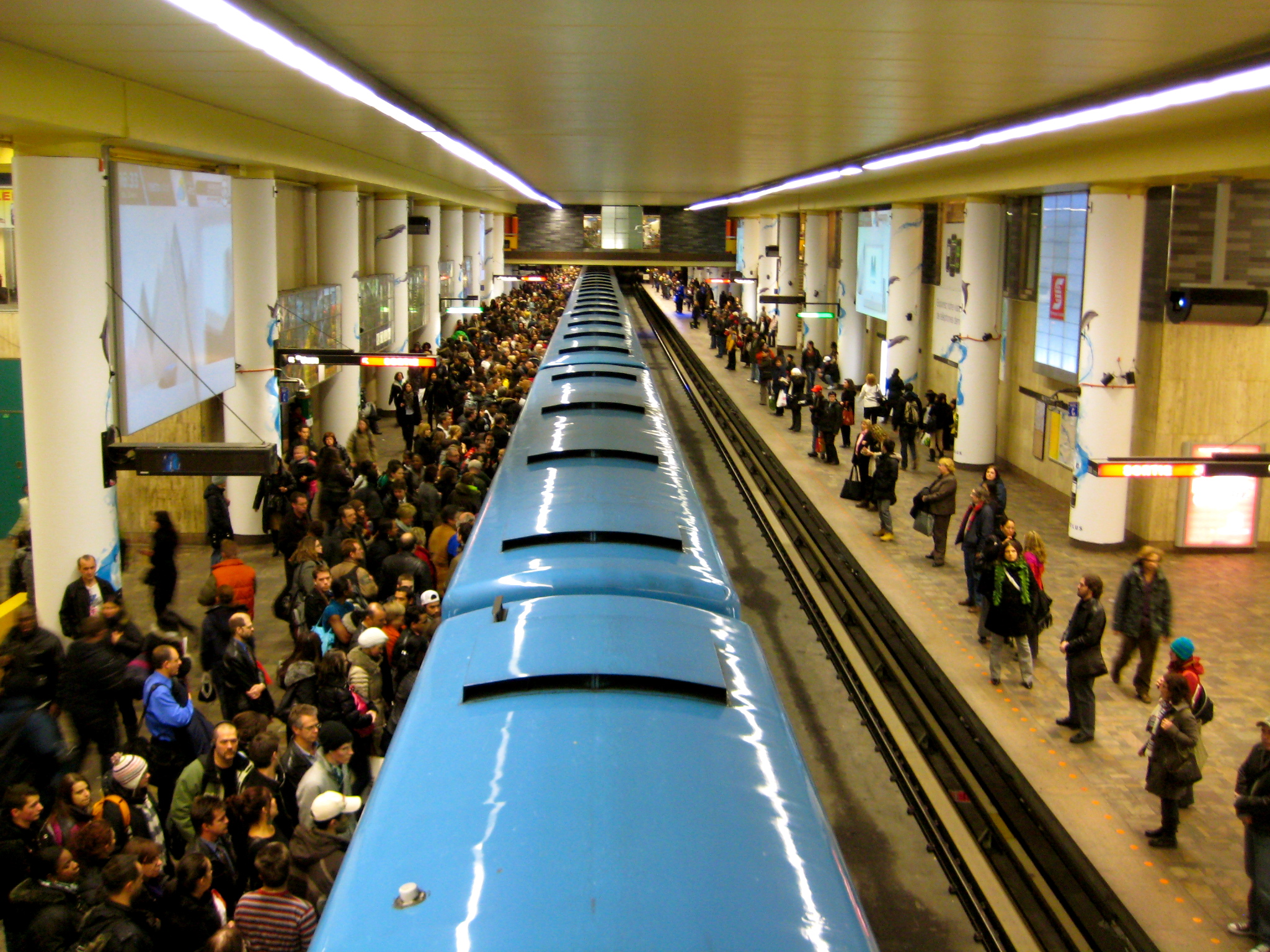
McGill station during rush hour.

== Renovation and upgrade works ==
In March 2012, the station underwent renovation work that included the replacement of Travertine tiles covering surfaces of the whole station, spanning over 1,835 square metres (19,750 sq ft). Other work included replacing the lighting system, fixing columns, beams, and concrete slabs and replacing granite staircases and handrails. By the end of 2016, modernized signage has been put in place, flooring has been completely replaced and the stained glass installation underwent a restoration and was put back in place.

In 2020, work began on making the station universally accessible, ahead of the arrival of the REM. The project involves the construction of a new entrance building, two elevators, new public artwork and refurbishment of three of the other entrances. This was estimated to cost around $58 million.

On April 3, 2023, McGill became the 26th accessible metro station in the network, with the completion of the refurbishment work.

== Réseau express métropolitain station ==
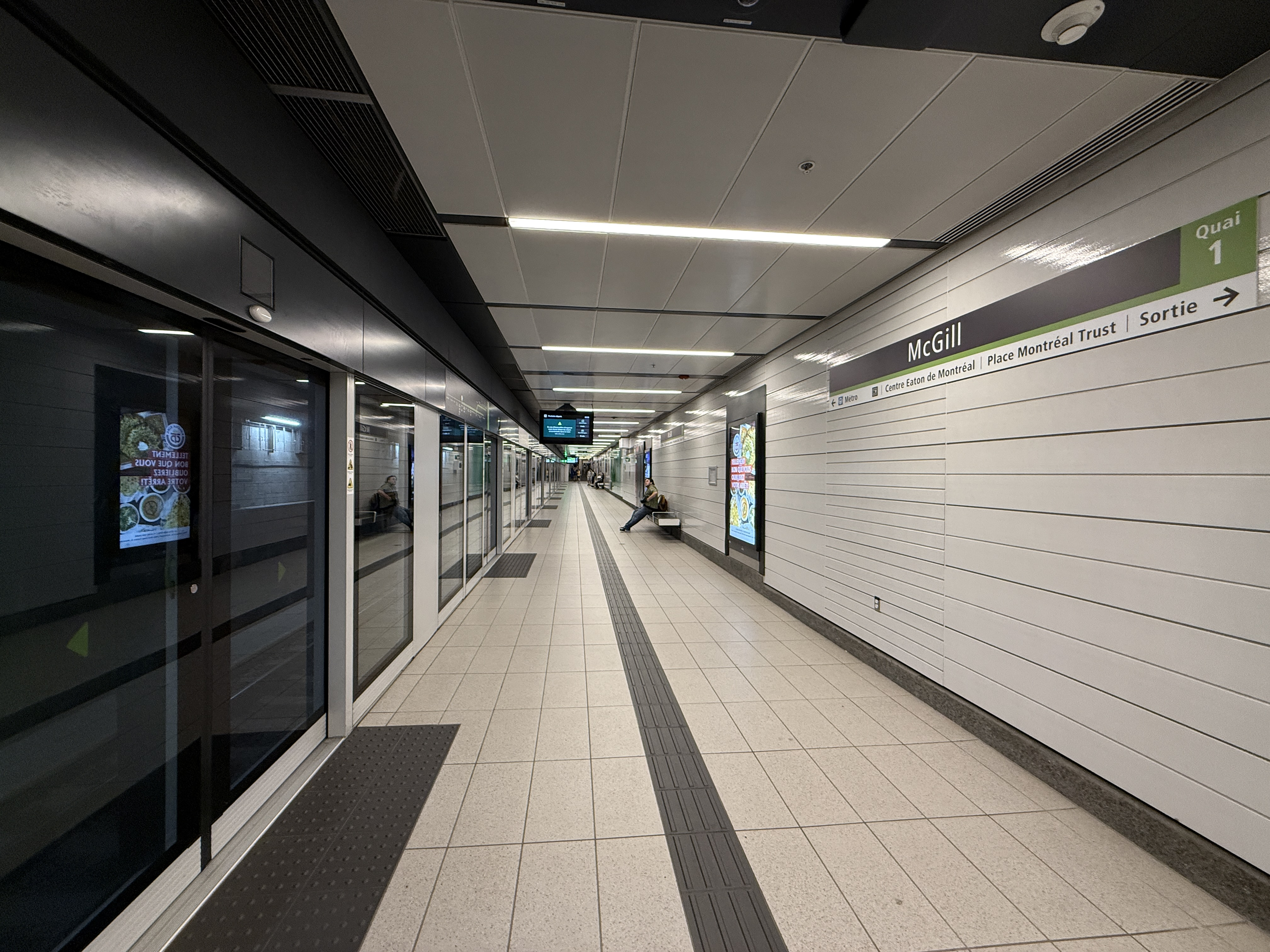
The REM station’s platform.

In November 2016, CDPQ Infra announced that the proposed Réseau express métropolitain (REM) system would connect to the Green line at McGill. As with the 1980s Line 3 proposal, the REM uses the historic Mont Royal tunnel to head north from downtown. The REM station is located under McGill College Avenue, and a pedestrian tunnel connects it to the Green Line station concourse, as well as the wider Underground City, nested between the Eaton Centre and Place Montreal Trust. CDPQ Infra indicates that the station will be the 2nd busiest station on the REM, with over 25,000 passengers per day.

Construction on the McGill REM station began in September 2018. In this location, the Mont Royal tunnel is not bored through solid rock, and therefore work to strengthen the historic tunnel was required. The REM station opened on 17 November 2025.

== Entrances ==
The station has seven entrances:

690, De Maisonneuve Ouest (Closed indefinitely)
640, De Maisonneuve Ouest
811, De Maisonneuve Ouest
2055, Robert-Bourassa Boulevard
2021, Avenue Union
1445, Av. Union and La Baie
705, De Maisonneuve Ouest (elevator access)

Since April 2026, the 690 De Maisonneuve exit was closed indefinitely citing security concerns.

== Architecture and art ==
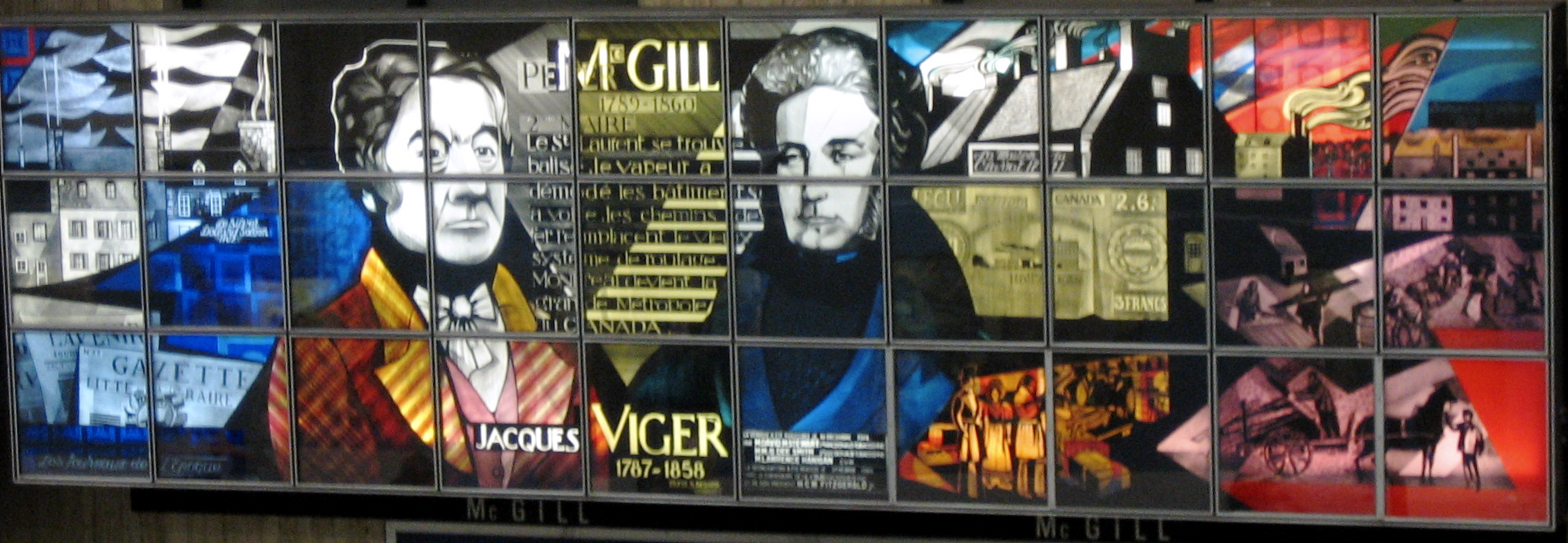
The images of Montreal's first two mayors, Jacques Viger and Peter McGill, in stained glass. The image of Peter McGill is sometimes mistakenly believed to be James McGill, the founder of the nearby university

This station contains several pieces of artwork.

The most prominent is Nicolas Sollogoub's Montreal Scenes Circa 1830, depicting the industrial era in the city as well as its early mayors and civic arms. This set of five stained-glass murals was donated by Macdonald Tobacco, and installed in 1974. Maurice Savoie created a set of terra cotta murals depicting fruit and flowers, surrounding the entrance to Eaton's (now the Complexe Les Ailes). This were installed when the station opened in 1966.

The construction of the Promenades de la Cathédrale in 1992 brought two new works of art, a light sculpture called Passūs by Murray MacDonald, and an installation of an aerial view of Montreal complete with miniature figures of the buildings, by art collective Les Industries perdues. The latter work is entitled To rise, we must push against the ground onto which we have fallen.

Work to install elevators in 2023 was accompanied by a new artwork in the 811 De Maisonneuve Ouest entrance, a triptych of works in painted aluminum by Mathieu Lévesque entitled Vestiges. These commemorate the nearby Golden Square Mile.

Finally, a tapestry by Kelvin McAvoy depicting the life of James McGill was donated by Canadian Universal Limited Insurance in 1969; however, after being vandalized, it was removed by the company for restoration, and then given as a perpetual loan to McGill University instead, where it is now exhibited at the McLennan Library.

== Origin of the name ==
McGill is named for McGill University. Founded in 1821 with money and on land bequeathed by Scottish-Canadian businessman James McGill, this is one of Canada's most prestigious institutions of higher education.

== Connecting bus routes ==
Société de transport de Montréal
| No. | Route | Connects to | Service times / notes |
|---|---|---|---|
| 35 | Griffintown | Angrignon; Monk; Place-Saint-Henri; Square-Victoria-OACI | Daily |
| 125 | Ontario | Place-des-Arts; Frontenac; Viau | Daily |
| 168 | Cité-du-Havre | Île-des-Soeurs; Square-Victoria-OACI | Daily |
| 420 | Express Notre-Dame-de-Grâce | Peel; Lucien-L'Allier; Bonaventure; Gare Centrale; Terminus Centre-ville | Weekdays only |
| 872 | Île-des-Soeurs Shuttle | Square-Victoria-OACI; Île-des-Soeurs | Weekdays, peak only Created to act as a temporary measure until the opening of the entire REM network |

== Nearby points of interest ==
=== Connected via the underground city ===
- Centre Eaton and Sainte-Catherine Street
- Tour McGill College and McGill College Avenue
- Place Montréal Trust
- Tour Industrielle-Vie
- 2020 Robert-Bourassa
- Place London Life/Les Galeries 2001 University Street
- McGill University – 688 Sherbrooke Street
- Hudson's Bay and Union Avenue
- Place Ville Marie and Central Station
- Peel Metro station and points west
- Bonaventure Metro station and points south
- Place de la Cathédrale and Sainte-Catherine Street

=== Other ===
- McGill University
- Percival Molson Memorial Stadium / Montreal Alouettes
- McCord Museum of Canadian History
- Redpath Museum
- Christ Church Cathedral
- CJNT-DT / Citytv studios
- Royal Victoria Hospital – Legacy Site
- Montreal Neurological Hospital
- Phillips Square
