= Confederation Building (Montreal) =

Office building in Montreal, Quebec, Canada

Coordinates: 45.5019°N 73.5704°W

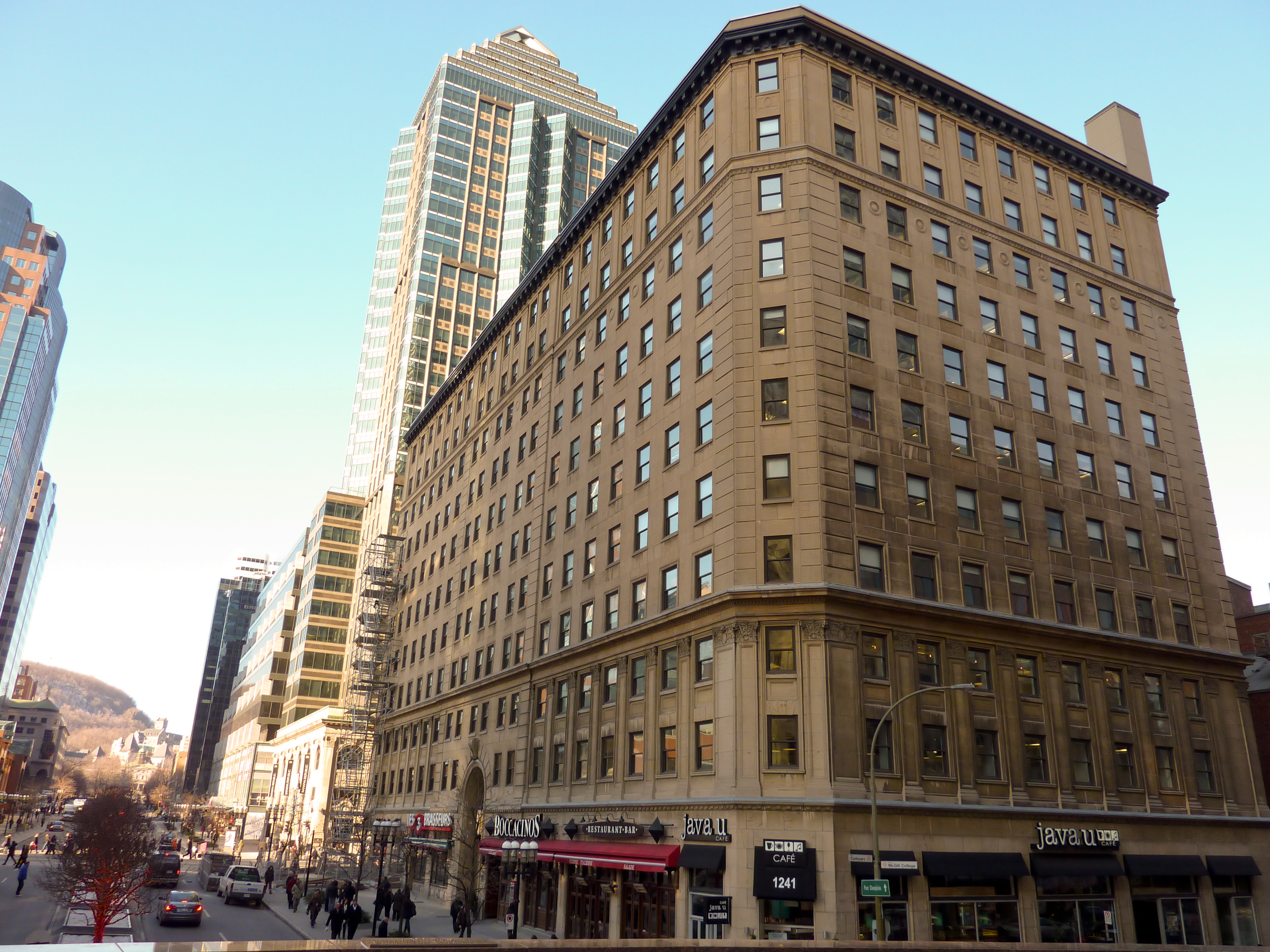
1253 McGill College Avenue.

1253 McGill College Avenue (French: 1253 avenue McGill College) is an office building in Montreal, Quebec, Canada. It is located on the corner of McGill College Avenue and Saint Catherine Street West in Downtown Montreal. It was formerly known as the Confederation Building. It is currently owned by Polaris Realty.

It is 11 stories tall, the first two floors are retail space while the top nine floors are offices. 1253 McGill College Avenue was designed in 1923 by Montreal architecture firm Ross and Macdonald and was completed in 1927. The first three stories of the exterior of the building along Saint Catherine and McGill College (from ground level to the second stringcourse), apart from its two corner entrances, retain their original limestone cladding, as does the entire elevation along Cathcart Street. The cladding above the second stringcourse along the building's north and west elevations (Saint Catherine and McGill College, respectively) were completely replaced by prefabricated concrete panels emulating the original units between 2012 and 2014. The building's architecture is considered to be Neoclassical.
