= Place Montreal Trust =

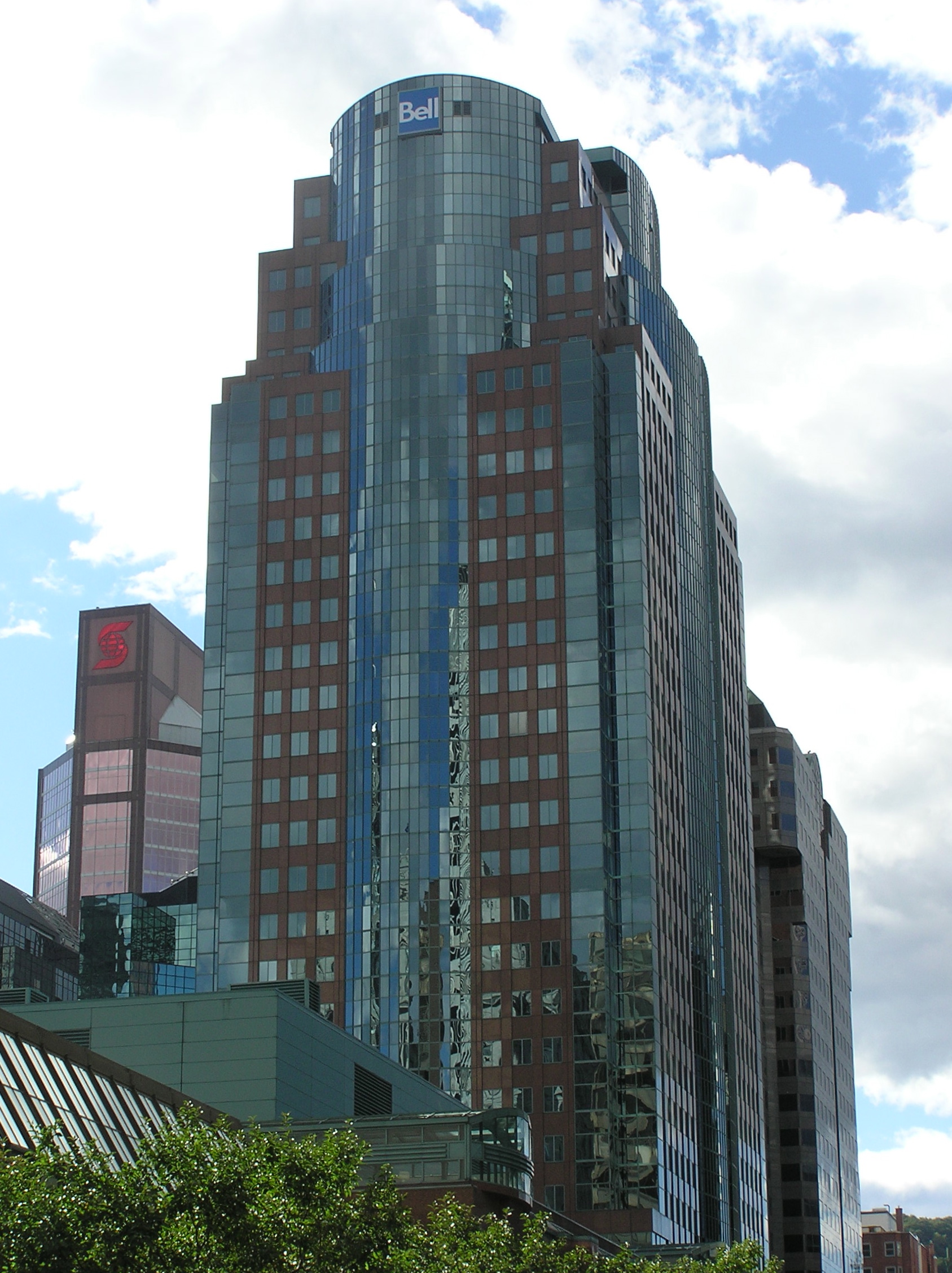
- Location: 1500, avenue McGill College; Montreal, Quebec, Canada; H3A 3J5
- Coordinates: 45°30′06″N 73°34′17″W
- Opened: 1988
- Manager: JLL
- Owner: Ivanhoé Cambridge
- Floors: 5
- Public transit: at McGill; McGill Terminus; STM Buses
- Website: www.placemontrealtrust.com/en/

Place Montreal Trust is a shopping mall in Montreal, Quebec, Canada, located west of the Eaton Centre, at the corner of Saint Catherine Street and McGill College Avenue in the city's downtown core. With over 320,000 square feet (29,729 m^{2}) of stores and services, Place Montreal Trust attracts 14 million visitors each year. Its indoor water fountain has the highest water spout in North America at 30 metres in height. Place Montreal Trust is linked to the Underground City of Montreal.

The Bell Media Tower is part of the Place Montreal Trust complex. Place Montreal Trust is named after the Montreal Trust Company which was a lender for its construction as well as one of its original co-owners (along with CDPQ and Cadillac Fairview-Shafter) and the main tenant of the tower.

== History ==
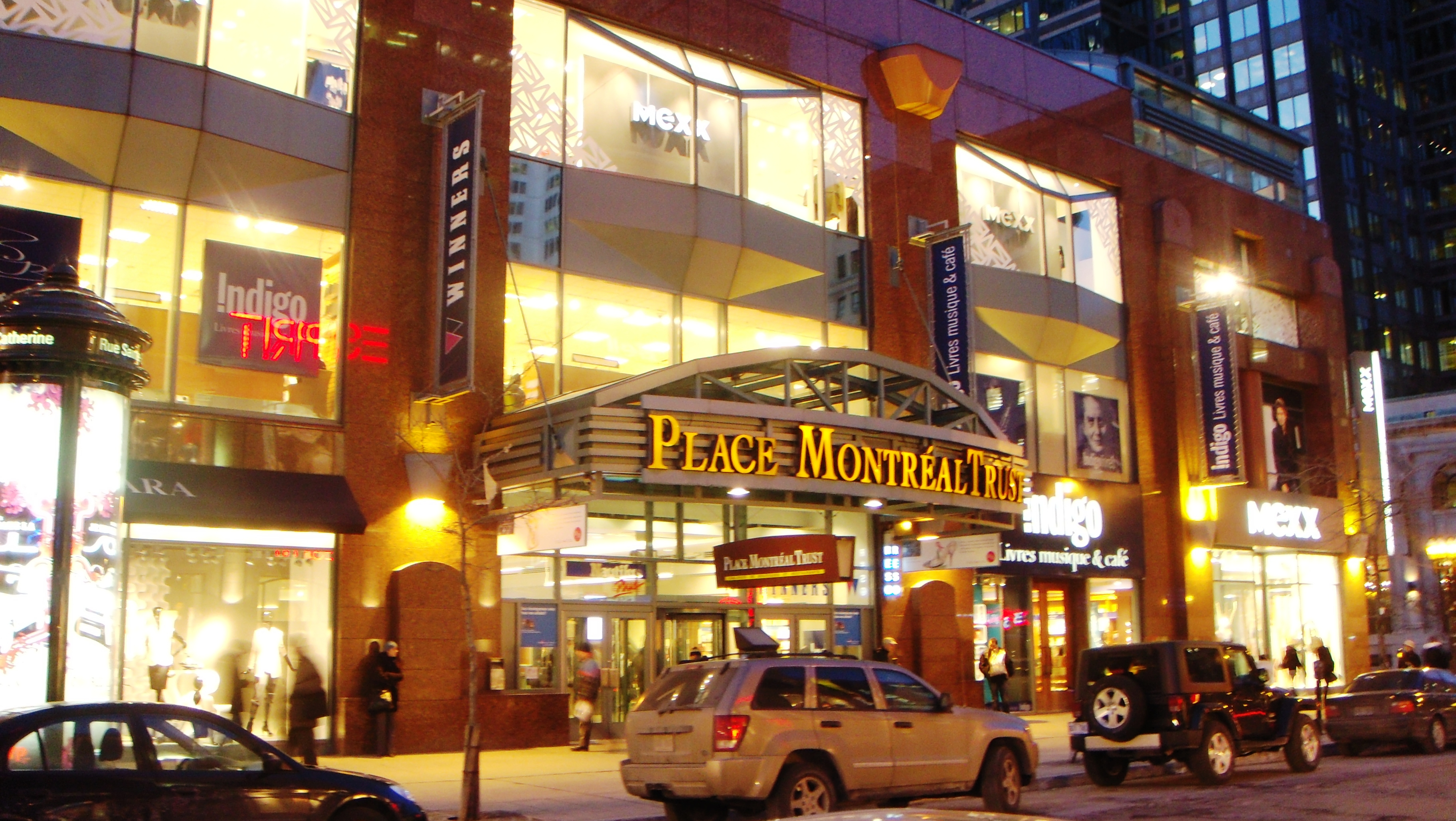
The shopping center portion viewed from Saint Catherine Street.

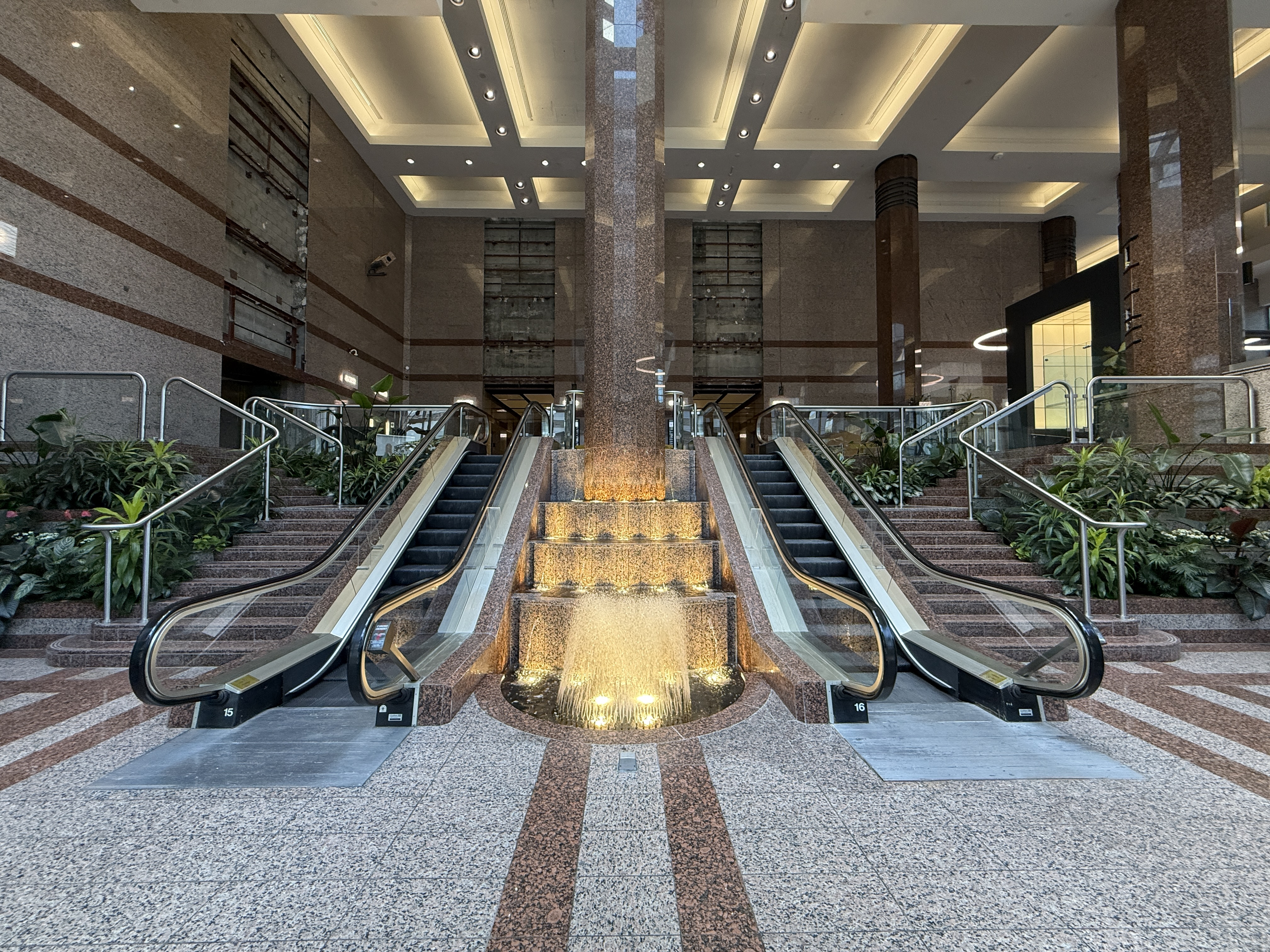
Office lobby

Place Montreal Trust was originally proposed to house a concert hall, in the mall's mezzanine and basement level. However, this design called for an office tower that would partially obstruct the view of Mount Royal from McGill College Avenue. The plan encountered public opposition, including from architectural activist Phyllis Lambert, a member of the board of directors of Cadillac Fairview, who participated in protests against her own company's plan. This idea of a concert hall on McGill College was abandoned in favour of a design for Place Montreal Trust with a wider setback, as part of a redesign of McGill College Avenue as a widened scenic avenue. The shopping mall of Place Montreal Trust was opened on March 30, 1988.

Ivanhoe Inc assumed the management of the shopping mall in August 1995, while Cadillac Fairview continued to manage the office building.

On July 7, 1999, Ivanhoe acquired 100% of Place Montreal Trust as part of a $20 million package intended to position Place Montreal Trust a major player in the Downtown Montreal revitalization plan.

In July 1998, Place Montreal Trust became home to Montreal's Planet Hollywood restaurant. The restaurant did brisk business for the first year, but closed in September 2001. The entrance to the restaurant was on the North/West corner of the Saint Catherine Street as well as the third floor of the mall. It has since been converted back to retail space.

== Atrium and fountain ==
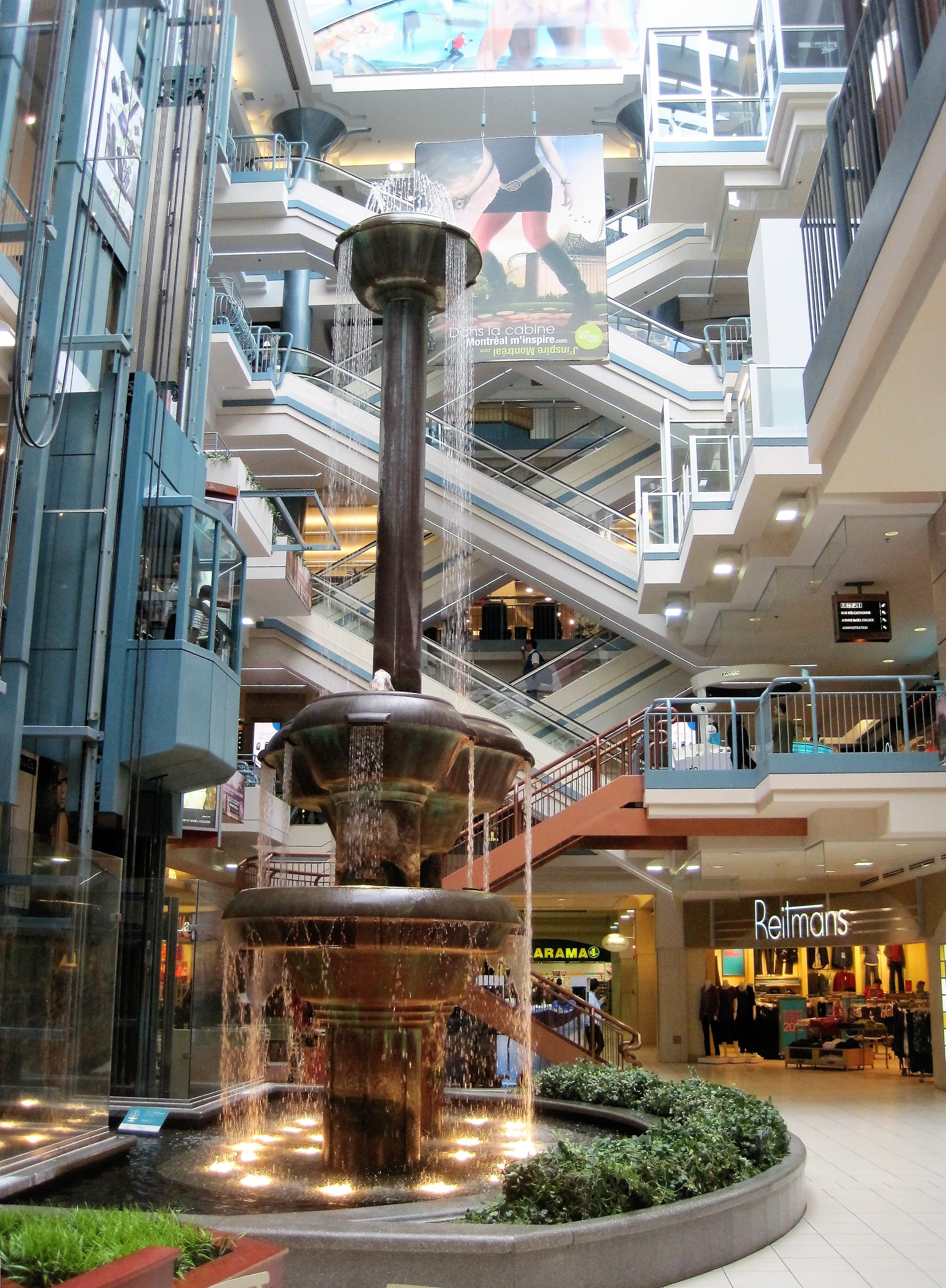
Fountain in 2010

Food Court in basement

Place Montreal Trust's atrium allows maximum use of natural light and features a large indoor water fountain. Its 30-metre water spout is the highest in North America. During the holiday season, a giant illuminated Christmas tree filled with animated storybook characters stands just as tall. The mall spreads out over 320,000 square feet (29,729 m^{2}) and attracts 14 million visitors a year.

== List of anchor stores ==
Name	No. of floors	Area	Notes
Indigo Books and Music	2	31,777 sq ft (2,952.2 m^{2})	
Zara	2	23,526 sq ft (2,185.6 m^{2})	
Winners	1	35,183 sq ft (3,268.6 m^{2})	

== See also ==
- Underground City, Montreal
- List of shopping malls in Montreal
