= Richter LLP =

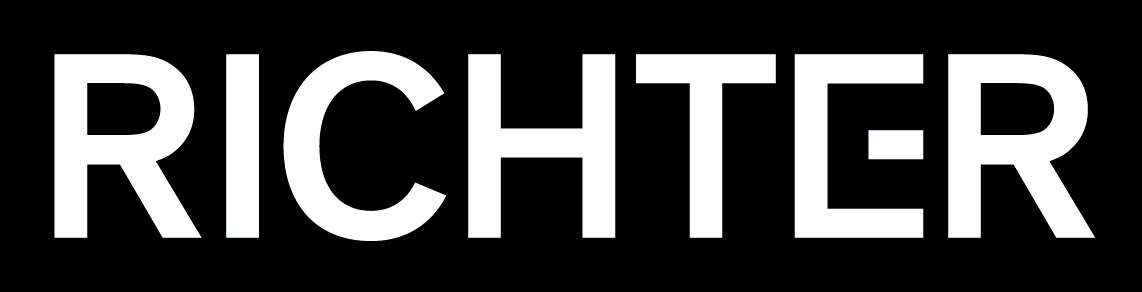
- Formerly: Richter Usher & Vineberg RSM Richter Chamberland
- Company type: Limited liability partnership
- Industry: Professional services
- Founded: 1926
- Headquarters: Richter Tower, Montreal, Canada
- Number of locations: 3
- Area served: North America
- Services: Audit; Financial advisory; Risk advisory; Tax; Cybersecurity; Estate planning
- Number of employees: 500+
- Website: www.richter.ca

Richter LLP is a Business | Family Office headquartered in Montreal, with an office in Toronto and a financial restructuring division in Chicago.

== History ==
The firm was founded in 1926 in Montreal, Canada, by Cecil Usher and William Richter under its first corporate name, Richter, Usher & Co. Beginning as an accounting firm, Richter has broadened their service offerings, now additionally specializing in insolvencies, restructuring, consulting, and business valuation.

In 1962, Richter became the first independent accounting firm in Canada to sign a prospectus for a public offering.

In 1999, the Richter Family Office was founded to provide wealth management services to high-net-worth individuals.

In 2013, The firm left RSM International after being part of the network for 10 years.

In 2016, Richter became the ninth-largest accounting services firm in Canada and is now the largest multi-family office in Canada.
