= 1501 McGill College =

36-storey skyscraper in Downtown Montreal

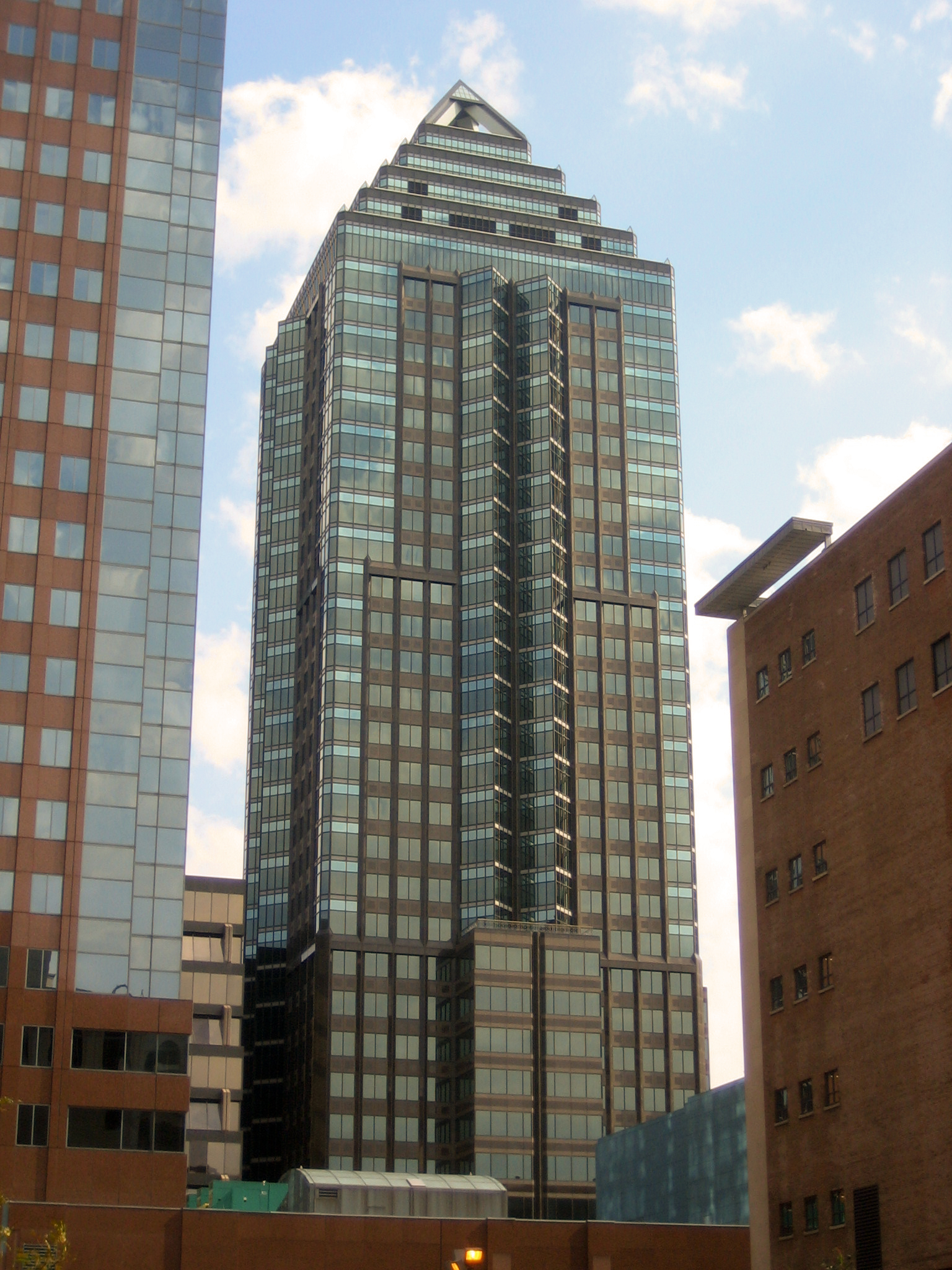

General information
- Type: Office
- Architectural style: Postmodern
- Location: Montreal, Quebec, Canada
- Coordinates: 45°30′8″N 73°34′18″W
- Completed: 1992

Height
- Roof: 158 m (518 ft)

Technical details
- Floor count: 36
- Floor area: 37,746 m^{2} (406,290 sq ft)

Design and construction
- Architect: WZMH Architects

Website
- www.1501mcgillcollegeave.com

1501 McGill College, also known as La Tour McGill, is a 158 m (518 ft), 36-storey skyscraper in Downtown Montreal, in Quebec, Canada. Named for its address at 1501 McGill College Avenue, it was completed in 1992 at the same time as the city's two tallest buildings, 1000 de La Gauchetière and 1250 René-Lévesque. It is connected to the McGill Metro station via the Underground City.

== Architecture ==
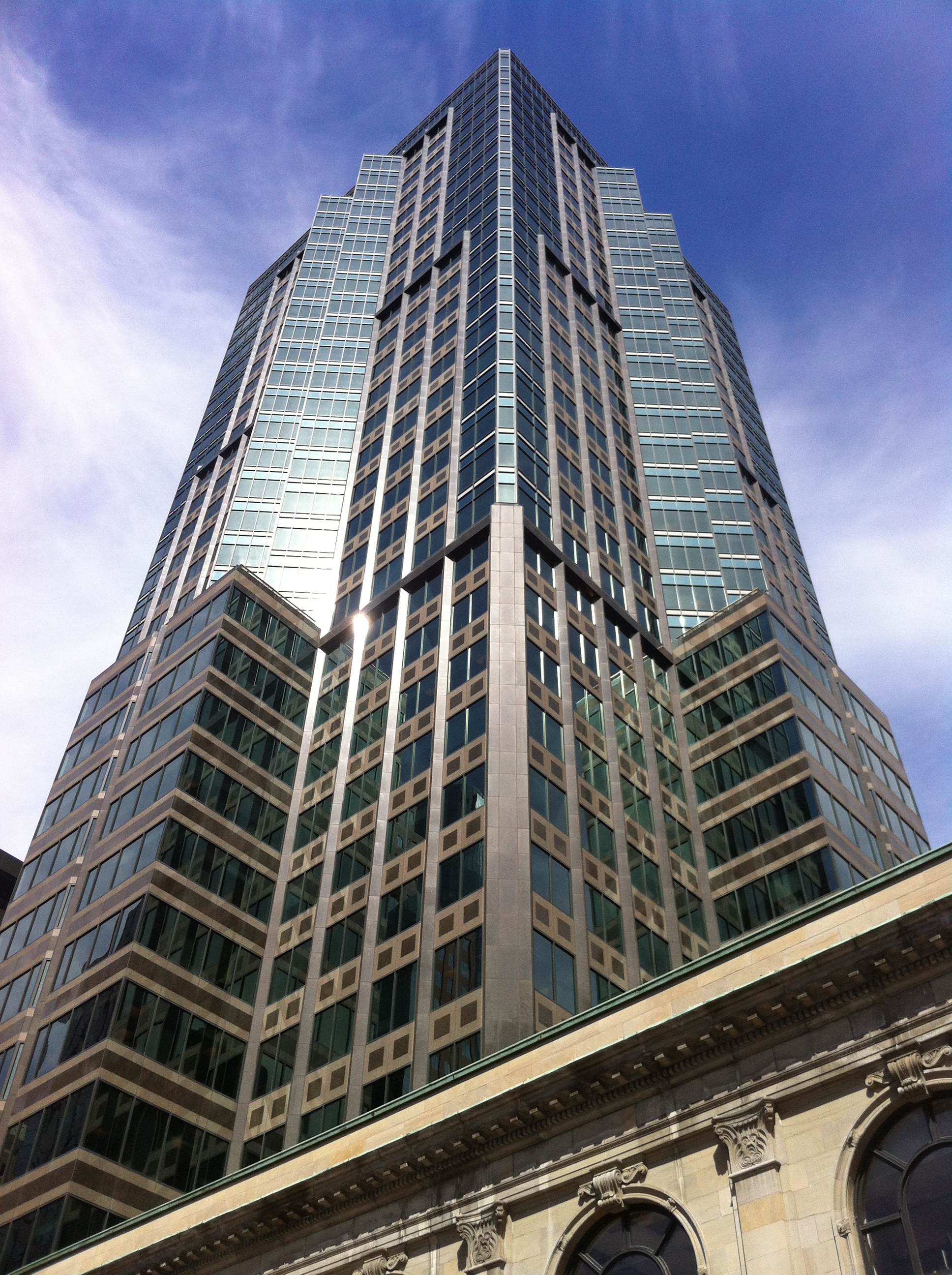
View from McGill College Avenue.

Designed by WZMH Architects, the building's postmodern form features a glass curtain wall that varies between blue and green depending on sunlight. The top 4 floors form a pyramid-shaped mechanical penthouse that is lit white at night. At certain times of year, it is lit with a colour (or colours) relating to a holiday or event. For example, it is lit white, green and red during the Christmas holidays (in a similar manner to the Empire State Building), purple and yellow for Easter, orange for Halloween, green for Saint Patrick's Day, red for Valentine's Day, and, as of April 2011, blue, white and red to support the Montreal Canadiens during the Stanley Cup playoffs.

== Tenants ==
- Bank of Canada
- BMO Capital Markets
- BMO Nesbitt Burns
- Chappuis Halder & Co
- Davies Ward Phillips & Vineberg
- DLA Piper
- Newedge Group
- RBC Dominion Securities
- Société Générale
- Consulate-General of France in Montréal

== See also ==
- List of tallest buildings in Montreal
