= Bell Media Tower =

Coordinates: 45°30′08″N 73°34′22″W

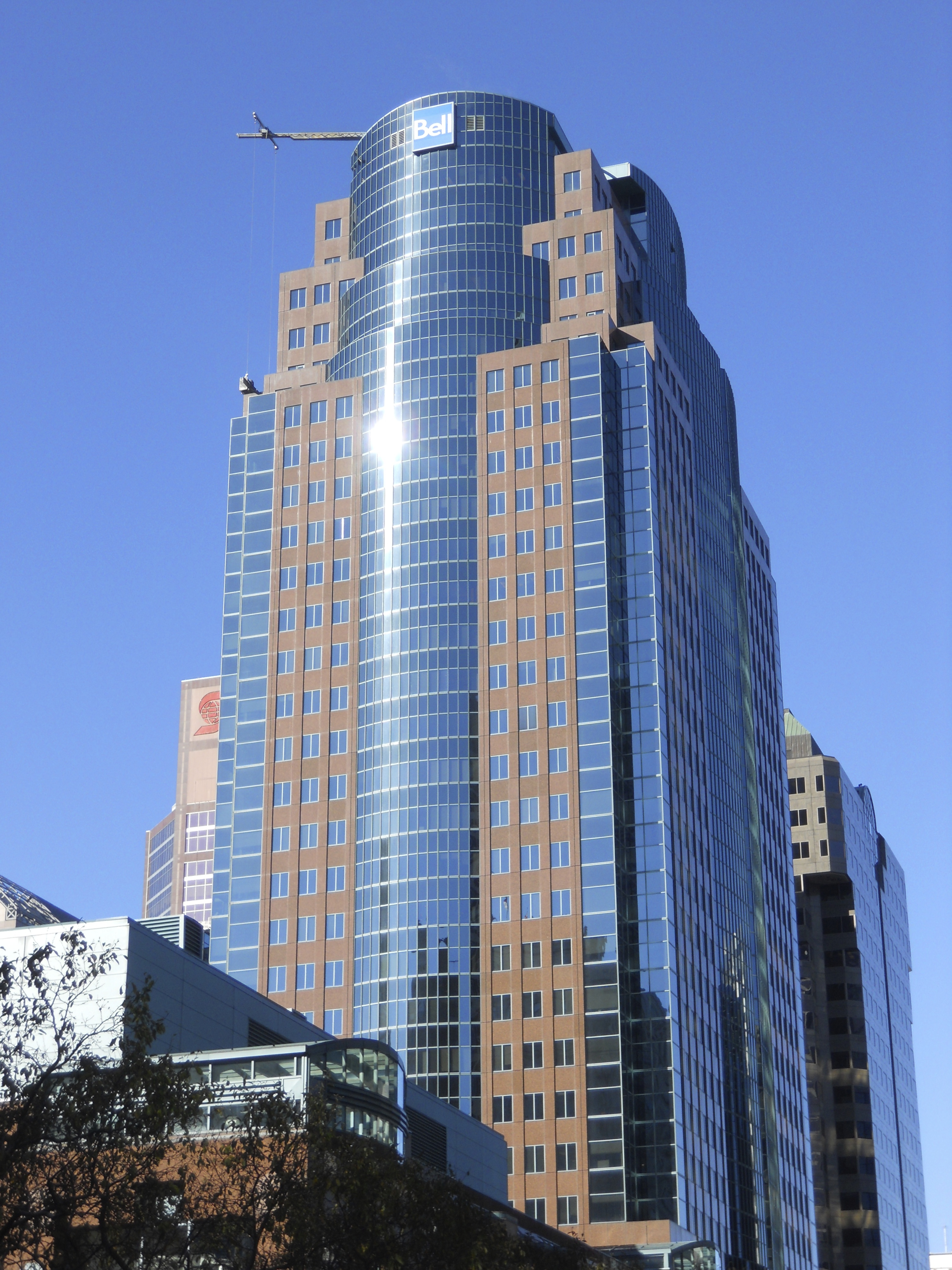
- Interactive map of the Bell Media Tower area
- Former names: Maison Astral
- Alternative names: Tour Bell Média

General information
- Status: Completed
- Type: Office
- Architectural style: Postmodern
- Location: Montreal, Quebec, Canada, 1800, avenue McGill College
- Completed: 1988

Height
- Roof: 125 m (410 ft)

Technical details
- Floor count: 30

Design and construction
- Architects: Eberhard and Eidler, Zeidler Partnership Architects, Erol Argun

The Bell Media Tower (Tour Bell Média) is a skyscraper in Montreal, Quebec, Canada. Located at 1800 McGill College Avenue, it was built for the Montreal Trust Company, and shared the name Place Montreal Trust with the adjoining mall. It stands 125 m (410 ft) and 30 storeys tall. It was originally owned by Cadillac Fairview but is now owned by Ivanhoe Cambridge. The main tenant was Astral Media, which had its corporate headquarters in the building along with several of its French-speaking television stations. In 2013, Bell acquired Astral Media, changing the tower's name to Bell Media Tower when it became regional offices for Bell Media. The NHL has its Montreal offices inside the tower.

== See also ==
- Place Montreal Trust
- List of tallest buildings in Montreal
