= 1981 McGill College =

Coordinates: 45.5034°N 73.5729°W

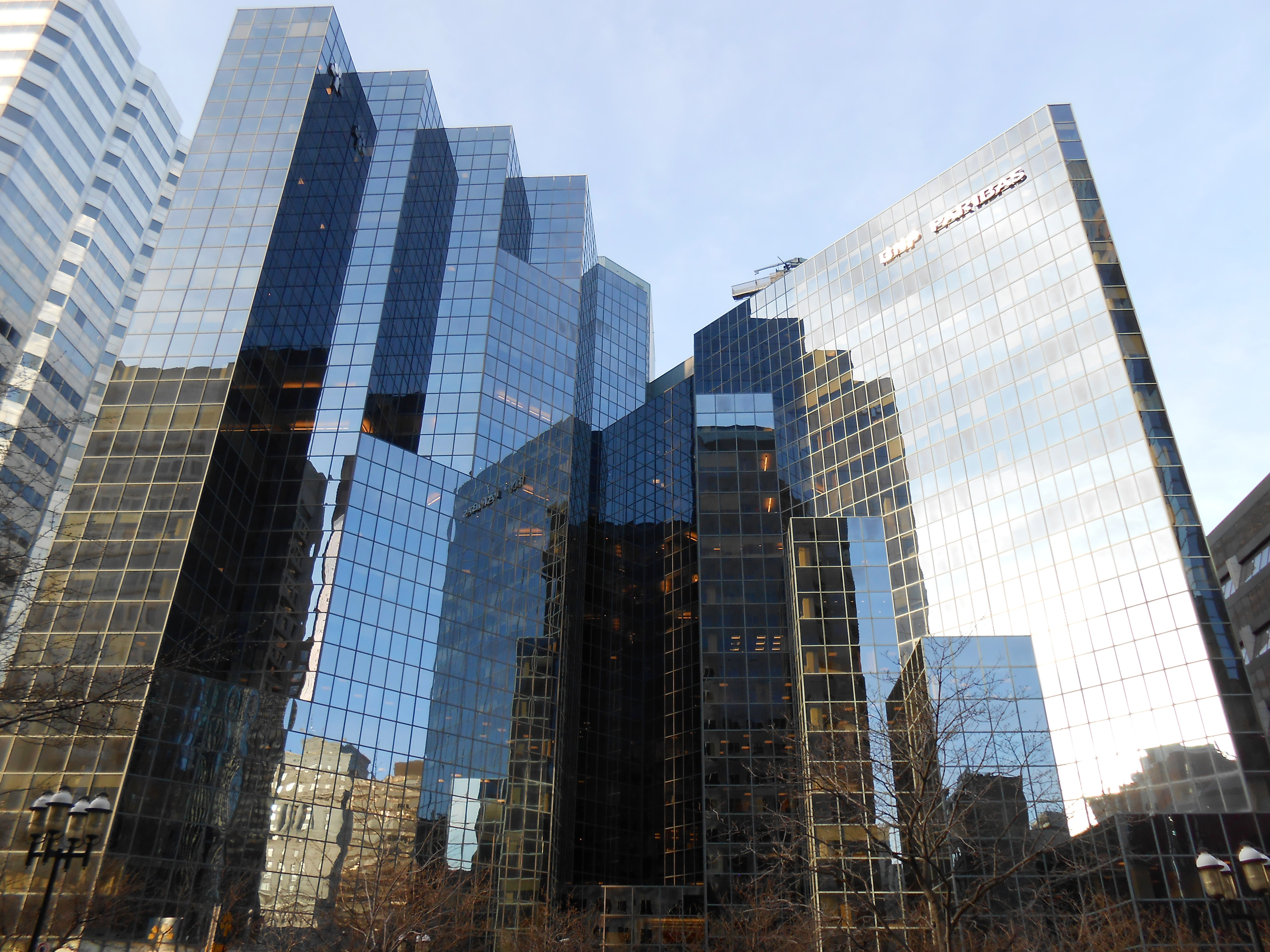

General information
- Type: Office
- Location: 1981 McGill College Avenue, Montreal, Quebec, Canada
- Completed: 1982
- Owner: Industrial Alliance
- Operator: Industrial Alliance

Height
- Roof: 82 metres (269 ft)

Technical details
- Floor count: 20
- Lifts/elevators: 11

Design and construction
- Architect: WZMH Architects

1981 McGill College, also known as The Richter Tower, is an 82 m (269 ft), 20-storey office complex in Montreal, Quebec, Canada. The building was designed by WZMH Architects. It is located on McGill College Avenue at the intersection of De Maisonneuve Boulevard, in the Ville-Marie borough of Downtown Montreal.

1981 McGill College is currently owned and managed by Canadian insurance company Industrial Alliance. It consists of 96,380 square feet of office space.

== Tenants ==
- BNP Paribas
- Epic Games
- Fiera Capital
- Mercer (consulting firm)
- Richter LLP
- State Street Corporation

== See also ==
- List of tallest buildings in Montreal
