= Fiera Capital =

Canada asset management company

Fiera Capital Corporation

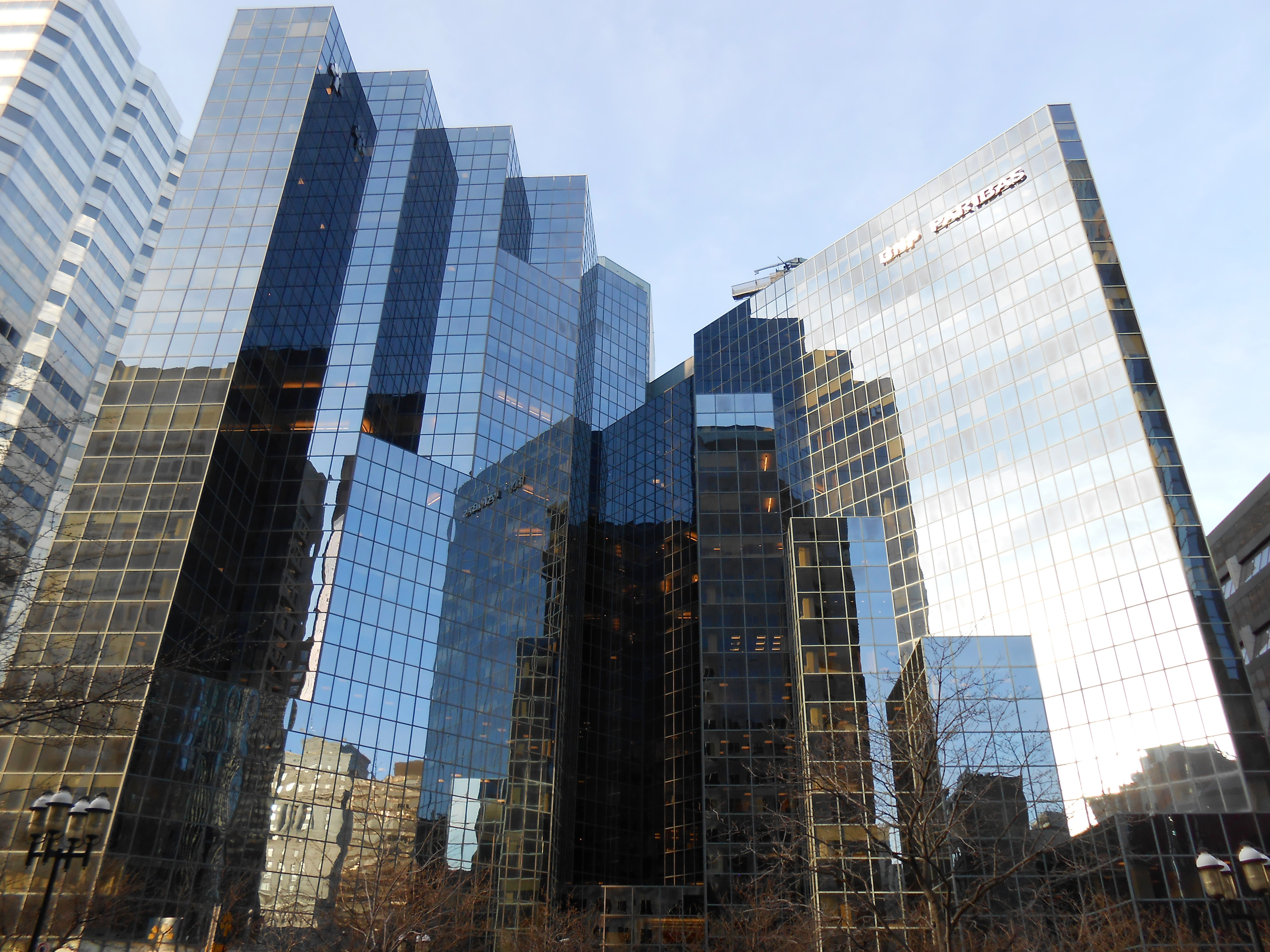
- Headquarters at 1981 McGill College
- Formerly: Fiera Sceptre
- Type: Public company
- Traded as: TSX: FSZ
- Industry: Investment Management
- Predecessor: Elantis Investment Management
- Founded: July 2003; 23 years ago
- Founder: Jean-Guy Desjardins
- Headquarters: 1981 McGill College, Montreal, Quebec, Canada
- Key people: Jean-Guy Desjardins (Chairman and CEO)
- Revenue: ▼CA$681.44 million (2022)
- Operating income: ▼CA$94.32 million (2022)
- Net income: ▼CA$31.52 million (2022)
- AUM: CA$164.2 billion (June 2023)
- Total assets: ▼CA$1.33 billion (2022)
- Total equity: ▼CA$346.88 million (2022)
- Number of employees: ▲850+ (2022)
- Website: www.fieracapital.com

Fiera Capital Corporation (Fiera) is a Canadian asset management company headquartered in Montreal, Quebec. The company has expanded through a series of acquisitions. It invests in multiple asset classes which are in both public and private markets although the majority of its assets are in public markets. North America is its biggest region with the majority of its investments being in Canada and the United States.

Outside North America, it also has offices in Europe and Asia.

== History ==
In July 2003, Fiera International Inc. (a wholly owned company of Jean-Guy Desjardins) came to an agreement with Desjardins Group to spin off Elantis Investment Management to form a new asset management firm named Fiera Capital. 70% will be owned by Fiera International while 30% would remain with Desjardins. It started with CA$5 billion in assets under management (AUM).

In 2005, Fiera started launching alternative strategy products with its first one being a market neutral strategy. The decision to do so was made as many traditional firms did not offer such strategies to investors at the time.

In October 2005, Fiera acquired Senecal Investment Counsel to increase its institutional investment strength.

In February 2006, Fiera acquired YMG Capital to increase its strength in private wealth-management. After the acquisition, Fiera AUM increased to CA$26 billion.

In September 2010, Fiera merged with publicly listed company, Sceptre Investment Counsel, to form Fiera Sceptre, a listed company on the Toronto Stock Exchange. Fiera would control 60% of the new company and the AUM of it would be around CA$30 billion.

In early 2012, Fiera acquired Natcan Investment Management, the asset management subsidiary of National Bank of Canada. Fiera paid CA$309.5 million in cash and shares to National Bank leading to it having a 35% stake in Fiera. Fiera's AUM increased to CA$54 billion which was almost double its previous size. Around the same time Fiera rebranded from Fiera Sceptre back to Fiera Capital.

In October 2012, Fiera acquired Canadian Wealth Management Group, a subsidiary of Société Générale. By this time, Fiera had multiple offices in Canada and had also expanded into the United States with offices in Boston and New York with more than 250 staff being employed by the company. Since launching its first office in Boston in 2011, Fiera now looked towards expanding its operations in the United States.

In January 2013, Fiera acquired UBS Asset Management's Canadian operations for CA$52 million. The deal was for CA$8 billion worth of fixed-income, equity and balanced funds. This came at a time UBS as cutting its workforce and needed to raise US$16 billion in capital. The deal was considered even more profitable for Fiera than its Natcan Investment Management acquisition. At the same time, Fiera acquired several alternative asset management funds containing CA$570 million of assets from GMP Capital for CA$10.75 million.

In October 2013, Fiera acquired Los Angeles-based wealth-management firm Bel Air Investment Advisors LLC and New York-based investment manager Wilkinson O’Grady & Co. for CA$156.3 million. Prior to this, all of Fiera's acquisitions were done in Canada. The two acquisitions were done to help Fiera expand in the United States. CA$8.5 billion was added to Fiera's AUM. In January 2021, Fiera sold Bel Air Investment Advisors to Hightower Advisors and sold Wilkinson Global Asset Management (a new entity consisting of Wilkinson O’Grady & Co's assets and employees) to Wilkinson Capital Partners.

In September 2014, Fiera acquired Propel Capital Corporation, a provider of closed-end funds for CA$12 million.

In October 2015, Fiera acquired New York-based fixed-income investment manager Samson Capital Advisors LLC for US$31.5 million. In November that year, Fiera announced it would expand into Japan by partnering with Nissay Asset Management, the investment management arm of Nippon Life. At the time, only long-only, global equity funds would be available as part of the arrangement.

In June 2016, Fiera acquired Ohio-based growth equity manager Apex Capital Management for US$145 million. In September that year, Fiera acquired hedge fund-of-funds and liquid alternatives manager, Larch Lane Advisors. In December that year, Fiera an acquired London-based frontier and emerging market investment firm, Charlemagne Capital. Fiera was expanding into Europe and Charlemagne Capital would act as the basis of its European operations.

In December 2017, Fiera acquired City National Bank 's $1.7 billion Emerging Markets Fund from its subsidiary, City National Rochdale.

In March 2018, Fiera acquired Hong Kong-based private credit firm, Clearwater Capital Partners, to expand in Asia. Around the same time, Fiera acquired Ontario-based CGOV Asset Management to increase its presence in the Canadian high-net-worth market.

In March 2019, Fiera acquired private alternatives lending platform, Integrated Asset Management for $74 million.

In May 2019, Natixis Investment Managers acquired a 11% stake of Fiera fo CA$128 million as part of a long-term strategic distribution agreement. In January 2022, Natixis Investment Managers sold its stake although the distribution agreement still continued. Also in May 2019, Foresters Financial sold its asset management business, Foresters Asset Management, to Fiera.
