= Nicolas Sollogoub =

Franco-Canadian artist and glassmaker

- Born: 10 November 1925; Soissons, France
- Died: 11 July 2014 (aged 88); Montreal, Quebec

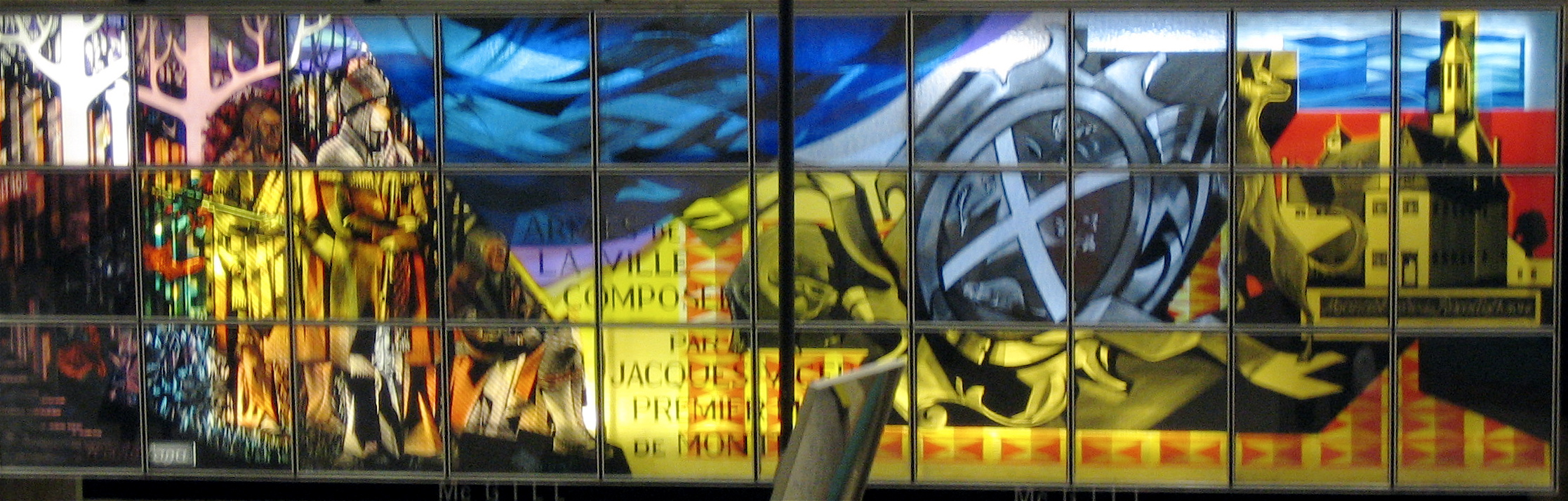
Stained glass, McGill metro station, Montreal (1 of 5)

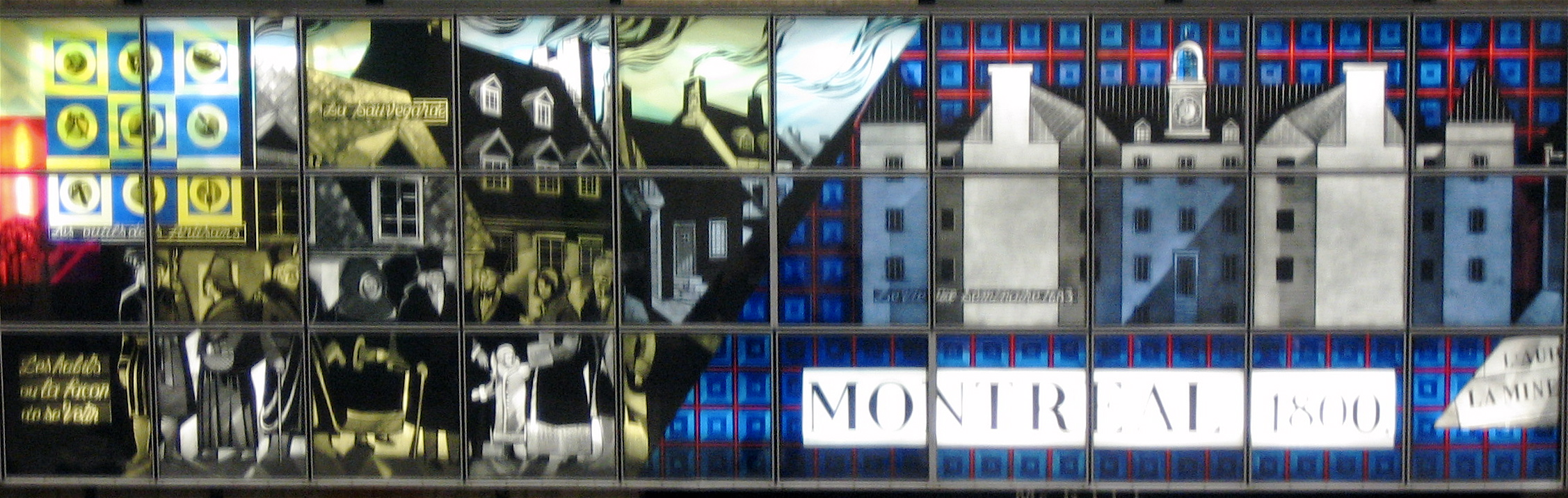
Stained glass, McGill metro station, Montreal (2 of 5)

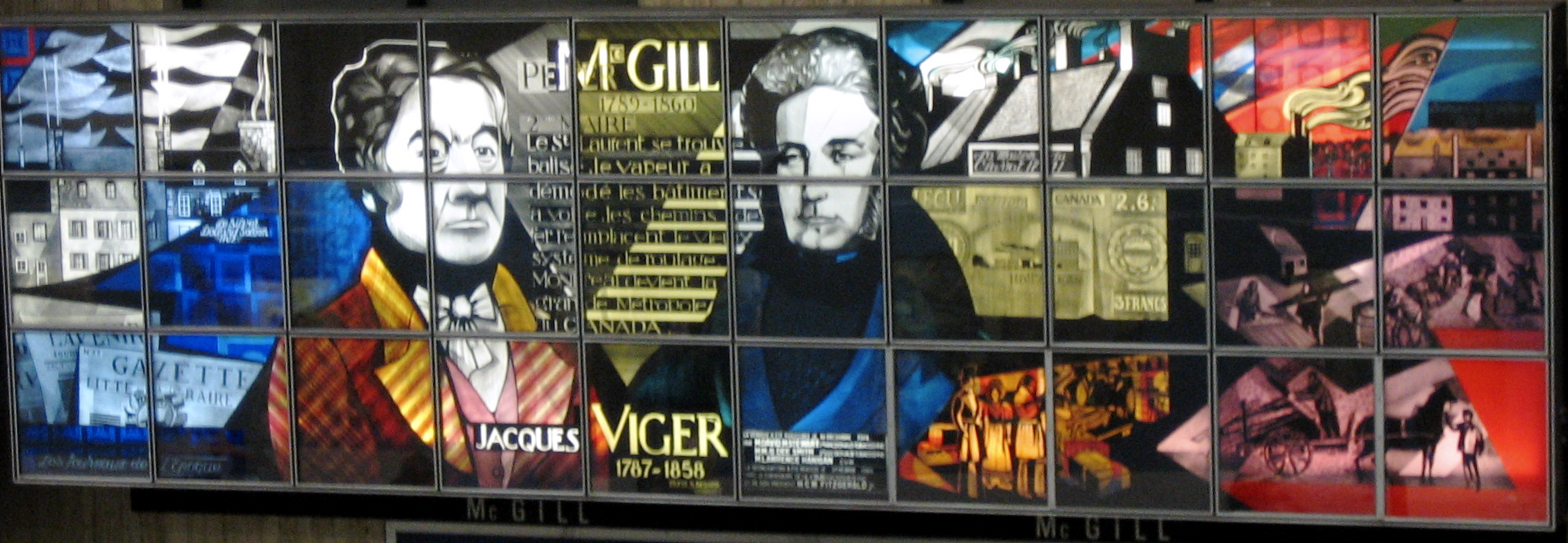
Stained glass, McGill metro station, Montreal (3 of 5)

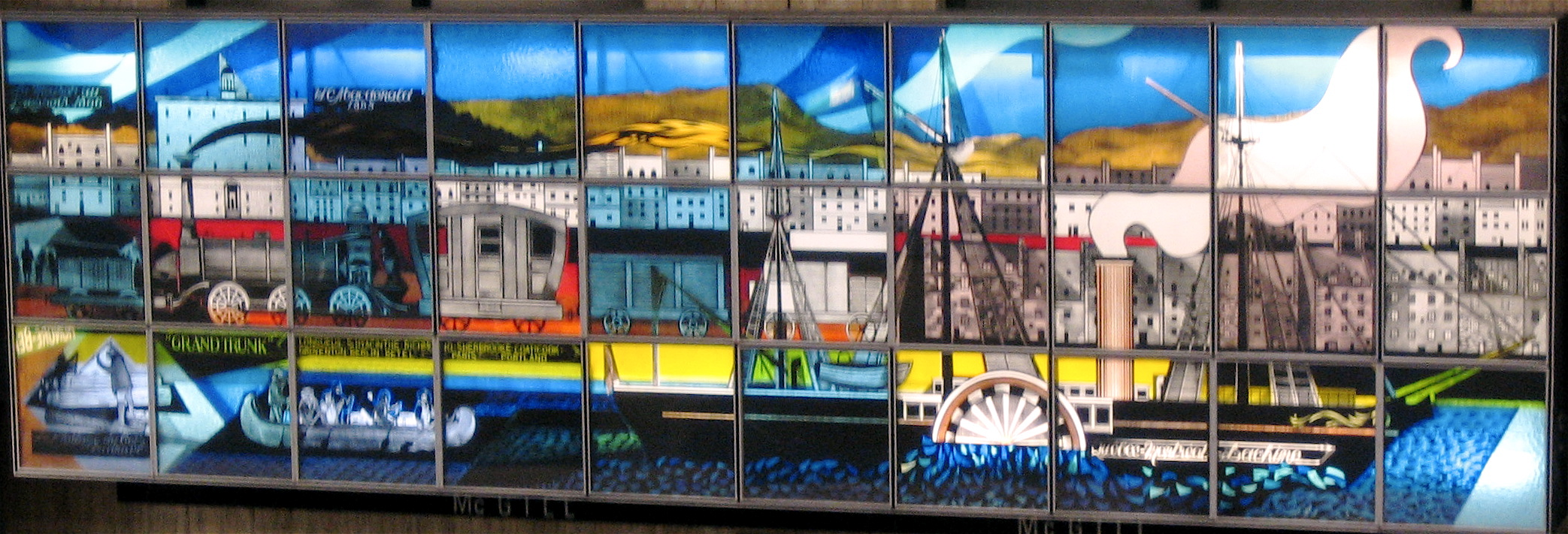
Stained glass, McGill metro station, Montreal (4 of 5)

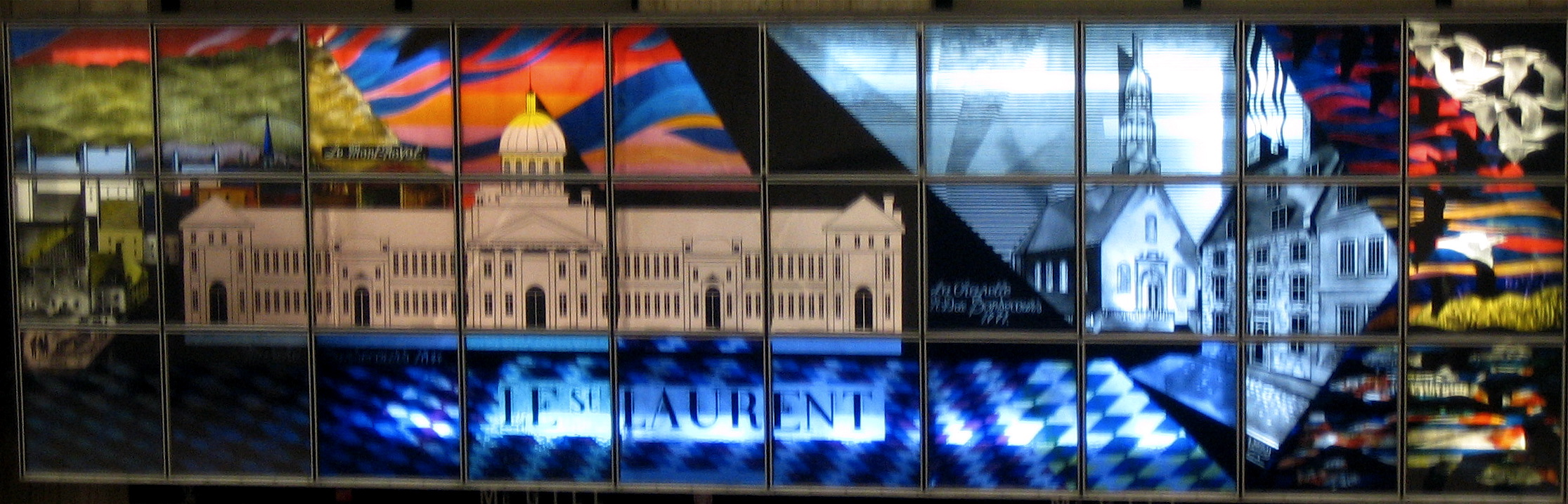
Stained glass, McGill metro station, Montreal (5 of 5)

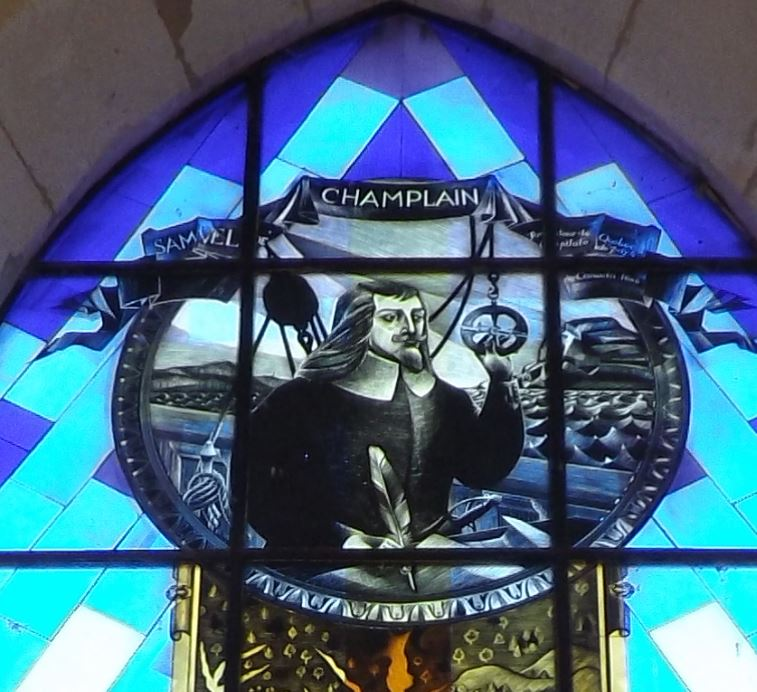
VITRAIL BROUAGE Samuel de Champlain

Nicolas Sollogoub (10 November 1925 – 11 July 2014) was a Franco-Canadian artist and master glassmaker. He is best known for his large-scale stained glass installations, including La vie à Montréal au XIXe siècle, a composition of five large stained-glass windows in Montreal's McGill Métro station.

== Early life and education ==
He was born in Soissons, France to Russian parents from Saint Petersburg. In his youth in France, Sollogoub studied theater and drawing at Russian College of Auteuil, then architecture and decoration at the studio of the Académie Charpentier, and the Beaux-Arts de Paris, where he took drawing lessons.

As a decorative artist, he entered the Office de Radiodiffusion Télévision Française (ORTF), where he continued to improve his skills in the art of stained glass until 1950 when he decided to leave France and settle in Montreal. After having produced numerous sets for the theater and the cinema, he joined Radio-Canada in 1964 as a graphic designer, illustrator, and set decorator, and became Frédéric Back's assistant. Sollogub's career at Radio-Canada spanned four decades.

== Life in Montreal ==
At the same time, he pursued a career in the art of stained glass which will give rise to numerous achievements. His best-known work is La Vie à Montréal in the 19th Century, a composition of five large stained-glass windows with a total length of 30.5 meters installed at the McGill Métro station. Between 1976 and 1979 in Montreal, he directed the restoration of Château Dufresne, the future museum of decorative arts in Montreal.

Passionate about the history of New France (seventeenth century) in Quebec, several of his stained glass windows reflect events of this period. His work 1701: The Great Peace of Montreal was acquired by the Pointe-à-Callière Museum of Archeology and History for its permanent collection. In Japan, he produced three stained glass windows that evoke the twinning between Montreal and Hiroshima.

In France, he produced a series of six stained glass windows that make up a memorial to the origins of New France in the church of Saint-Pierre de Brouage, the birthplace of Samuel de Champlain.

Sollogoub died 11 July 2014 at Saint-Luc hospital in Montreal.

== Awards ==
In November 1996, Sollogoub received the Medal of the City of Paris, "Vermeil" level, the highest, in the hall of honor of the town hall of the 16th arrondissement of Paris, for his large glass roof Le Chemin du Roy au pais de Canada. In 2011, he was a medalist recipient (in absentia) of the Knight of the Order of Arts and Letters from the Consul General of France.
