= McGill College Avenue =

Street in Montreal, Canada

Coordinates: 45°30′08″N 73°34′18″W

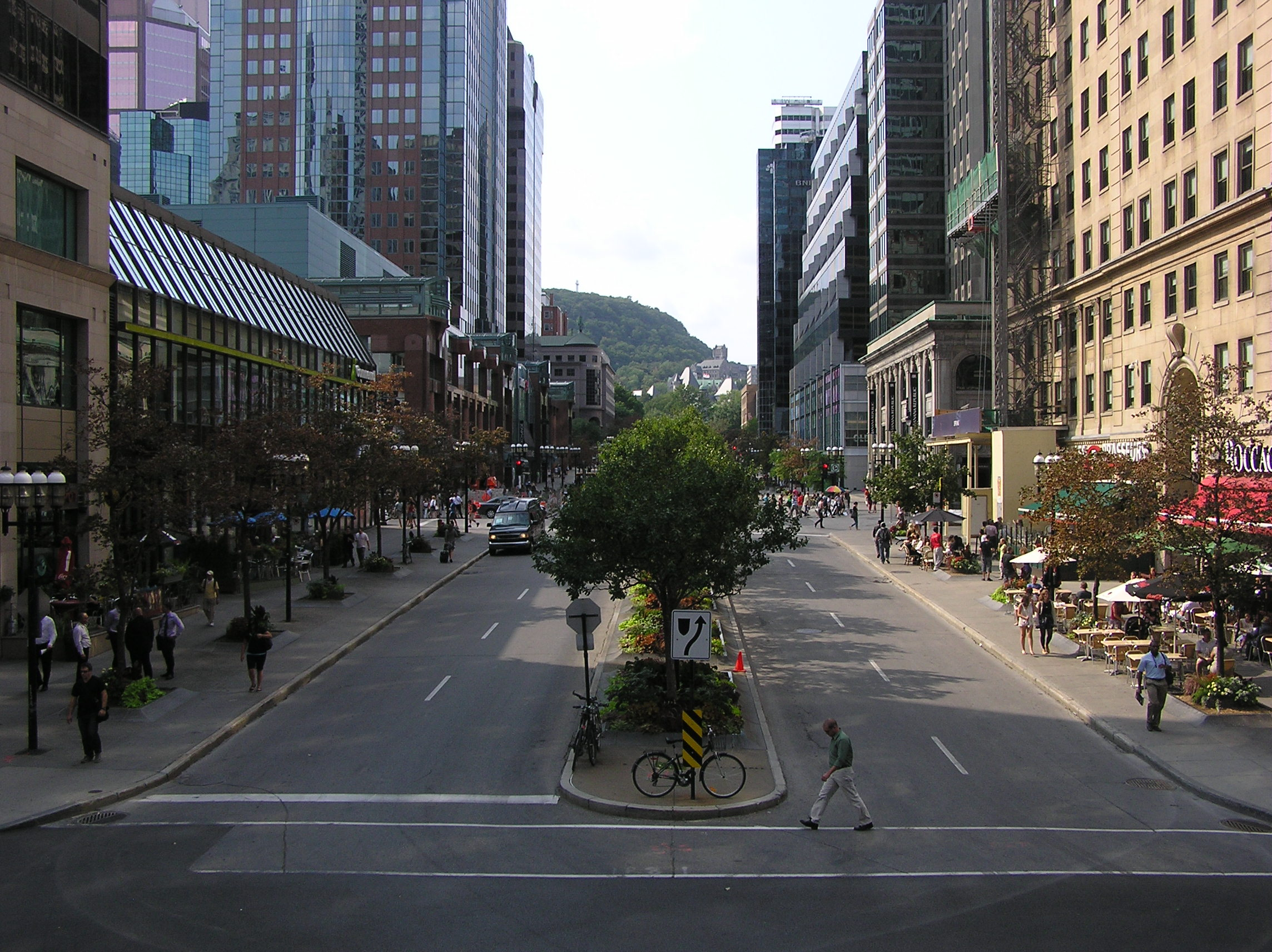
- View from Place Ville Marie.
- Interactive map of McGill College Avenue
- Native name: avenue McGill College (French)
- Location: Between Roddick Gates and Place Ville Marie
- Major junctions: R-138 Sherbrooke Street

Construction
- Construction start: 1857

McGill College Avenue (officially in French: avenue McGill College) is a street in downtown Montreal, Quebec, Canada. Named for McGill University, the street was widened in the 1980s and transformed into a scenic avenue with McGill's Roddick Gates on Sherbrooke Street at its north end and the Place Ville Marie plaza at its south end.

== History ==
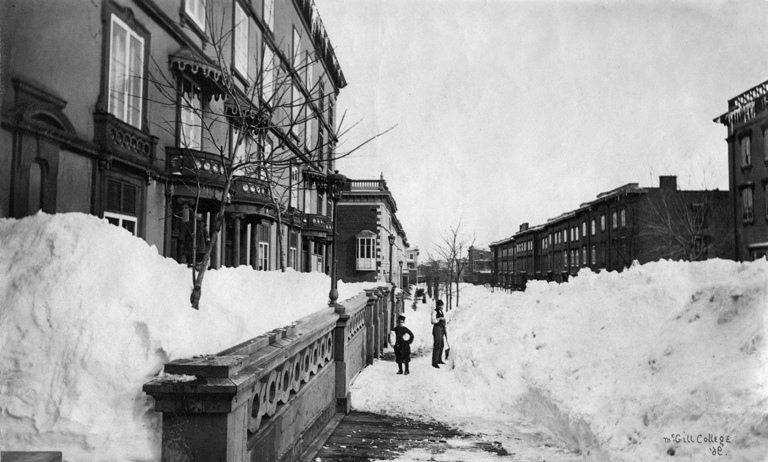
McGill College Avenue in 1869, following a snow storm, looking south from Sherbrooke Street.

The street was first laid out in 1857, on the axis leading up to the original McGill College Building, now the Arts Building of McGill University. Proposals to widen McGill College date back to at least 1952, when the French architect Jacques Greber submitted a design to the City of Montreal.

In 1983, the plan to widen McGill College as a scenic avenue was imperiled by a proposal to house a concert hall in Place Montreal Trust, with a design for an office tower that would have partially obstructed the view of Mount Royal. The plan encountered public opposition, including from architectural activist Phyllis Lambert, a member of the board of directors of Cadillac Fairview, the project's developer. This idea of a concert hall on McGill College was abandoned in favour of a design for Place Montreal Trust with a wider setback. Montreal's concert hall would instead be built further east, as part of the Place des Arts complex.

== Structures ==
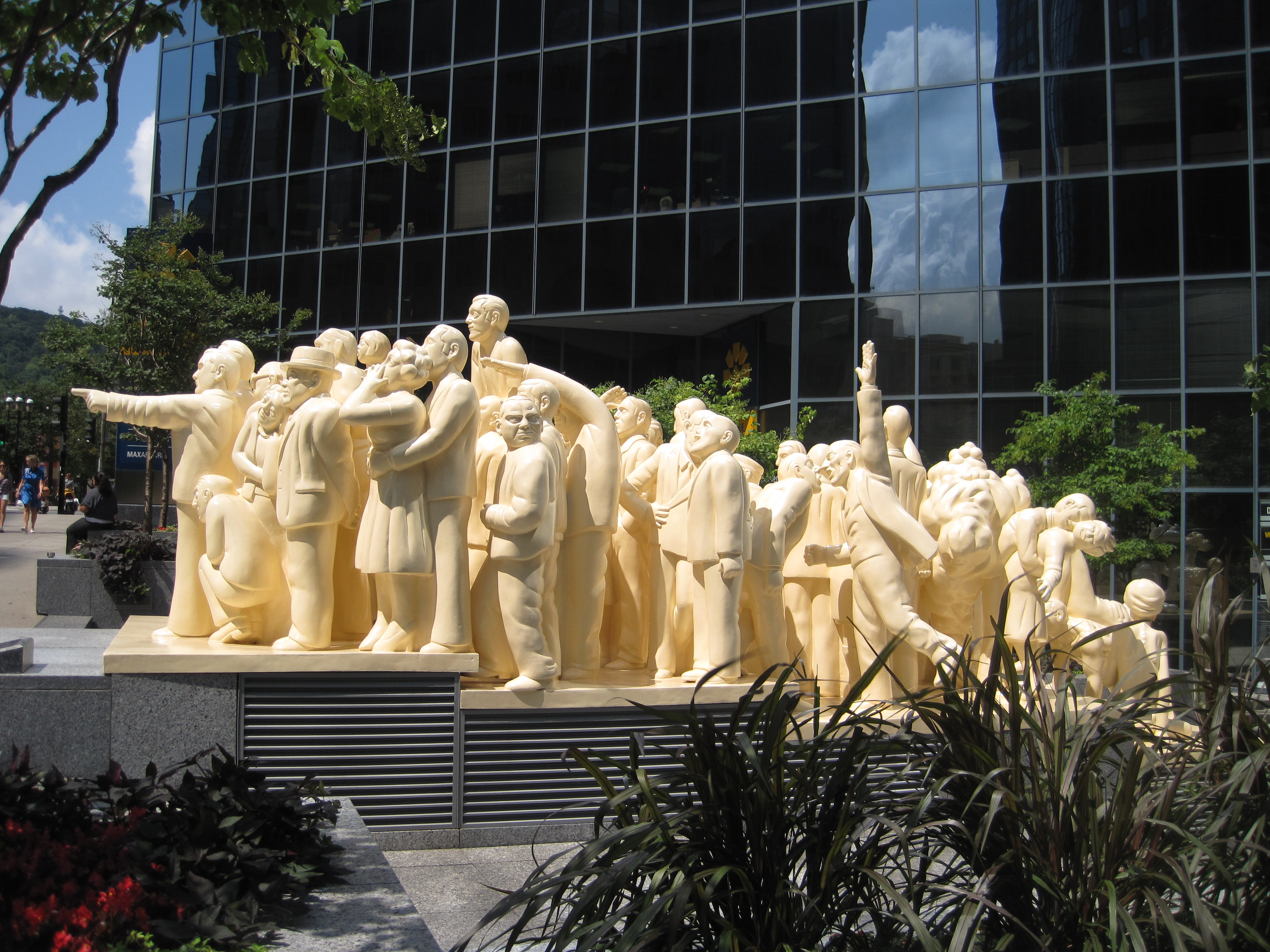
The Illuminated Crowd., "La_Foule_illuminée".

Only four blocks in length, buildings along McGill College include 1981 McGill College 1253 McGill College, 1501 McGill College, Place Montreal Trust and its adjoining Bell Media Tower, 2000 McGill College and Centre Eaton. Public art on the street includes the sculpture The Illuminated Crowd by Raymond Mason, in front of 1981 McGill College. The Mount Royal Tunnel runs directly under the avenue.

== Events ==
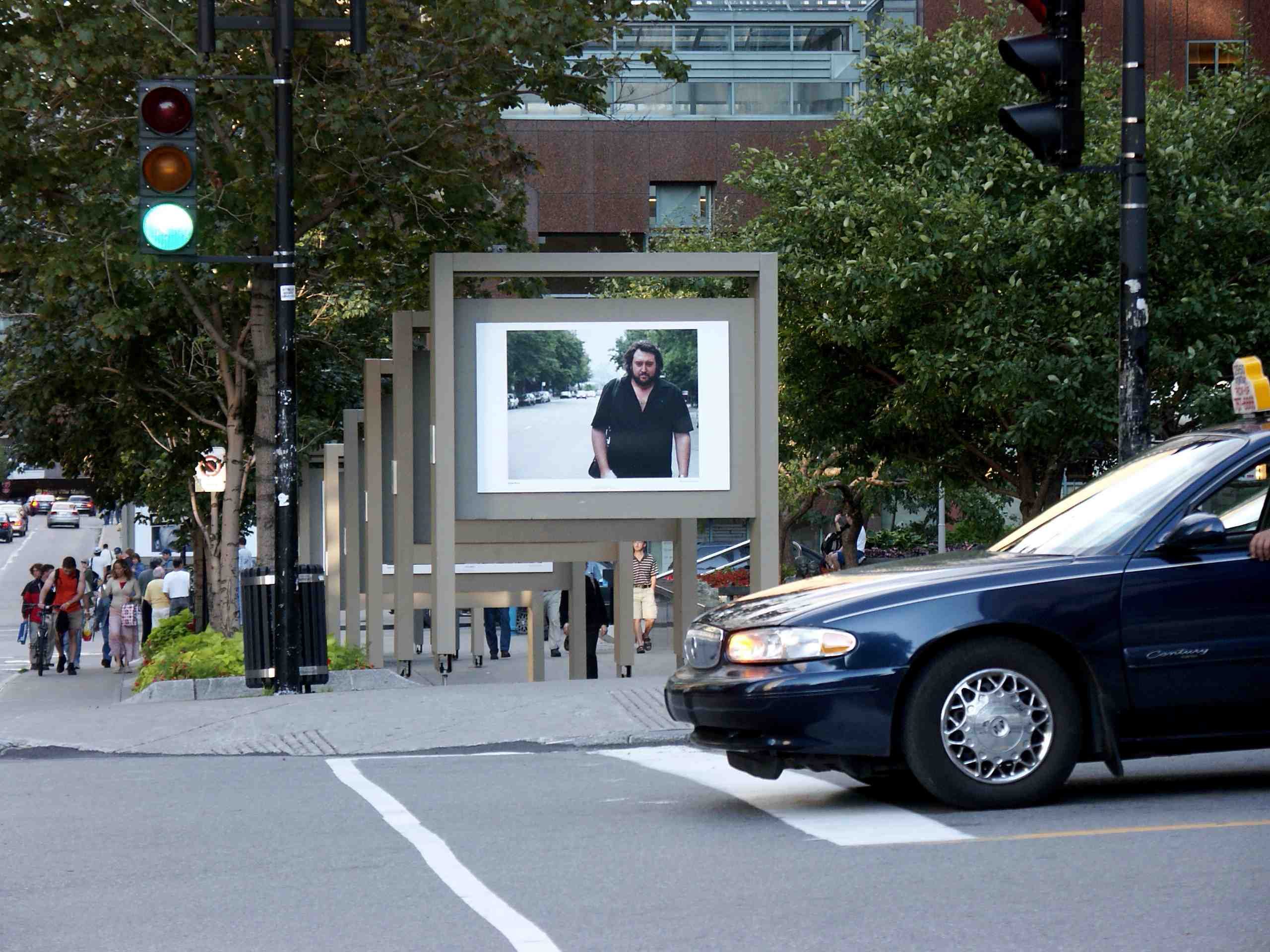
Photo exhibit on McGill College.

During the summer, the west sidewalk is the site of photography exhibitions by the nearby McCord Museum.

Since 2001, the street has been the site of the Montréal Fashion and Design Festival, which takes place each year in early August.
