= 2000 McGill College =

2000 McGill College (IA Tower)
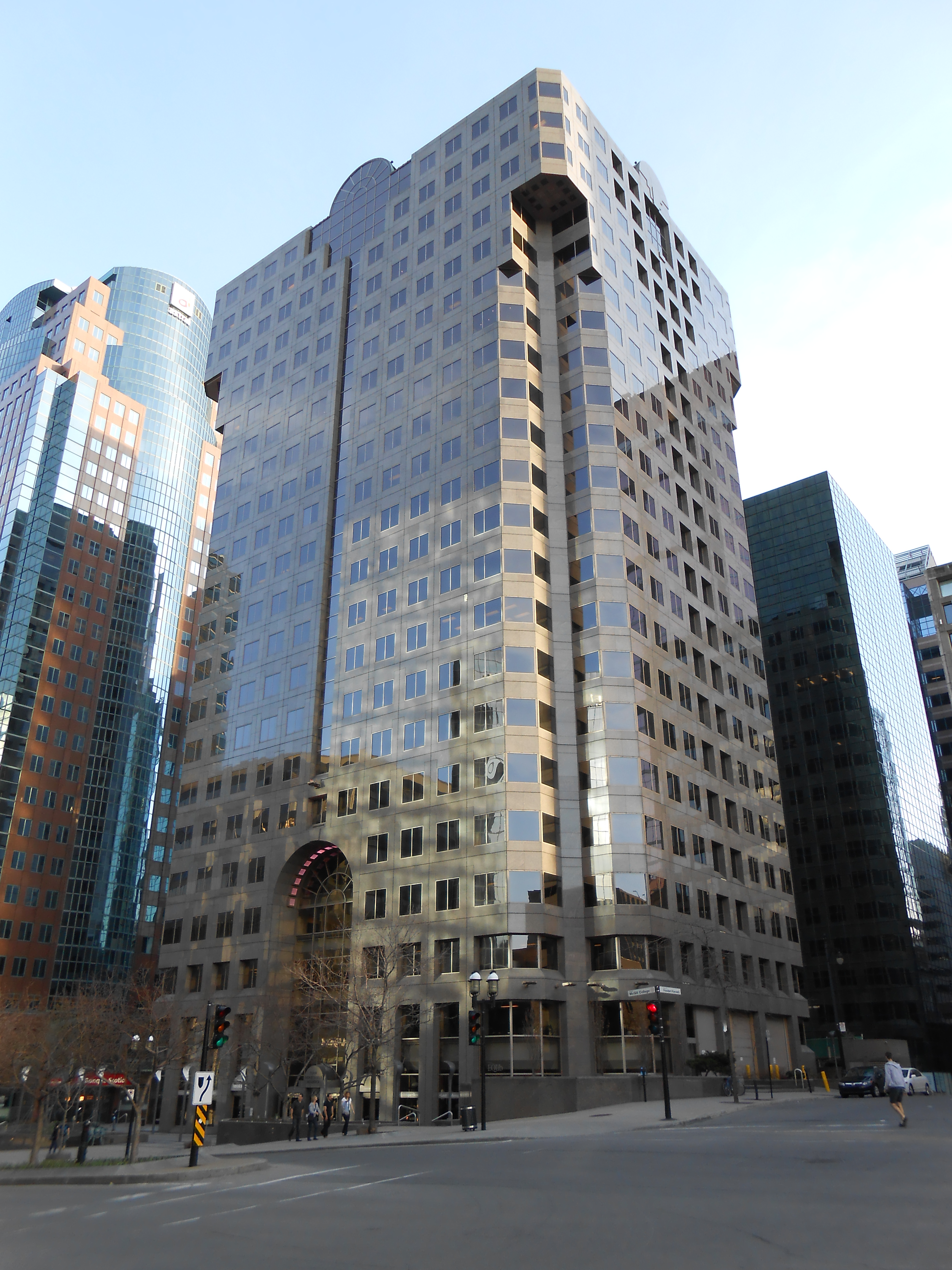

General information
- Type: Office
- Architectural style: Postmodernism
- Location: 2000 McGill College, Montreal, Quebec, Canada
- Completed: 1986
- Owner: Industrielle Alliance
- Height: 282 ft (86 m)

Technical details
- Floor count: 23
- Lifts/elevators: Schindler Elevator Corp.

Design and construction
- Architecture firm: Tolchinsky and Goodz

The IA Tower (Industriel Alliance Tower or Tour Industrielle Alliance), originally called Industrial Life Tower, is a 23 stories high rise building located in downtown Montreal, Quebec, Canada. Inaugurated in 1986, it was one of the first postmodernist high rises built in downtown Montreal.

== History ==
The IA Tower was the result of a joint venture between the then Industrial Life Insurance Company and First Québec Corporation. Built on McGill College Avenue, the tower was designed to be a premium grade-A office building

The original tenants included Industrial Life, Dominion Securities Pitfield, Ernst and Whinney, Quantum group and Rolland Inc. Following the 1987 merger between Industrial Life Insurance and Alliance Nationale, the tower was renamed with the Industrielle Alliance name.

Located between Boulevard De Maisonneuve Ouest and Avenue du Président-Kennedy, the IA Tower is ornamented by city furnitures and the public artwork Le banc des secrets by Lea Vivot.

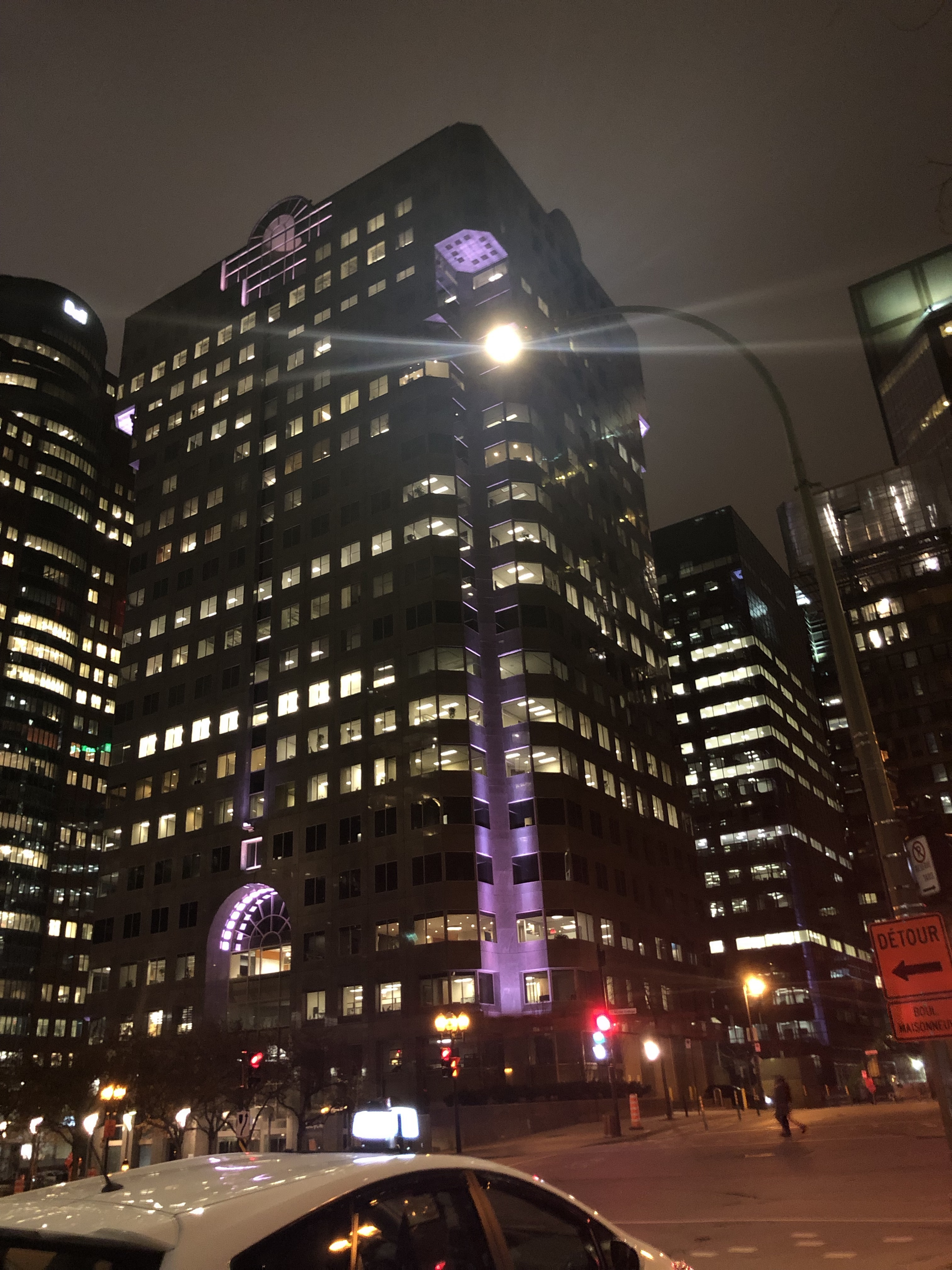
Night view of 2000 McGill College, taken in May 2019.

== Architecture ==
Designed by the Montreal firm Tolchinsky and Goodz, the IA Tower is made of Quebec polished granite. The building is larger at the last three floors and is designed to provide a maximum view of the Mont-Royal. Due to its conception, every floor apart from the three top floors has eight corner offices.

== Notable tenants ==
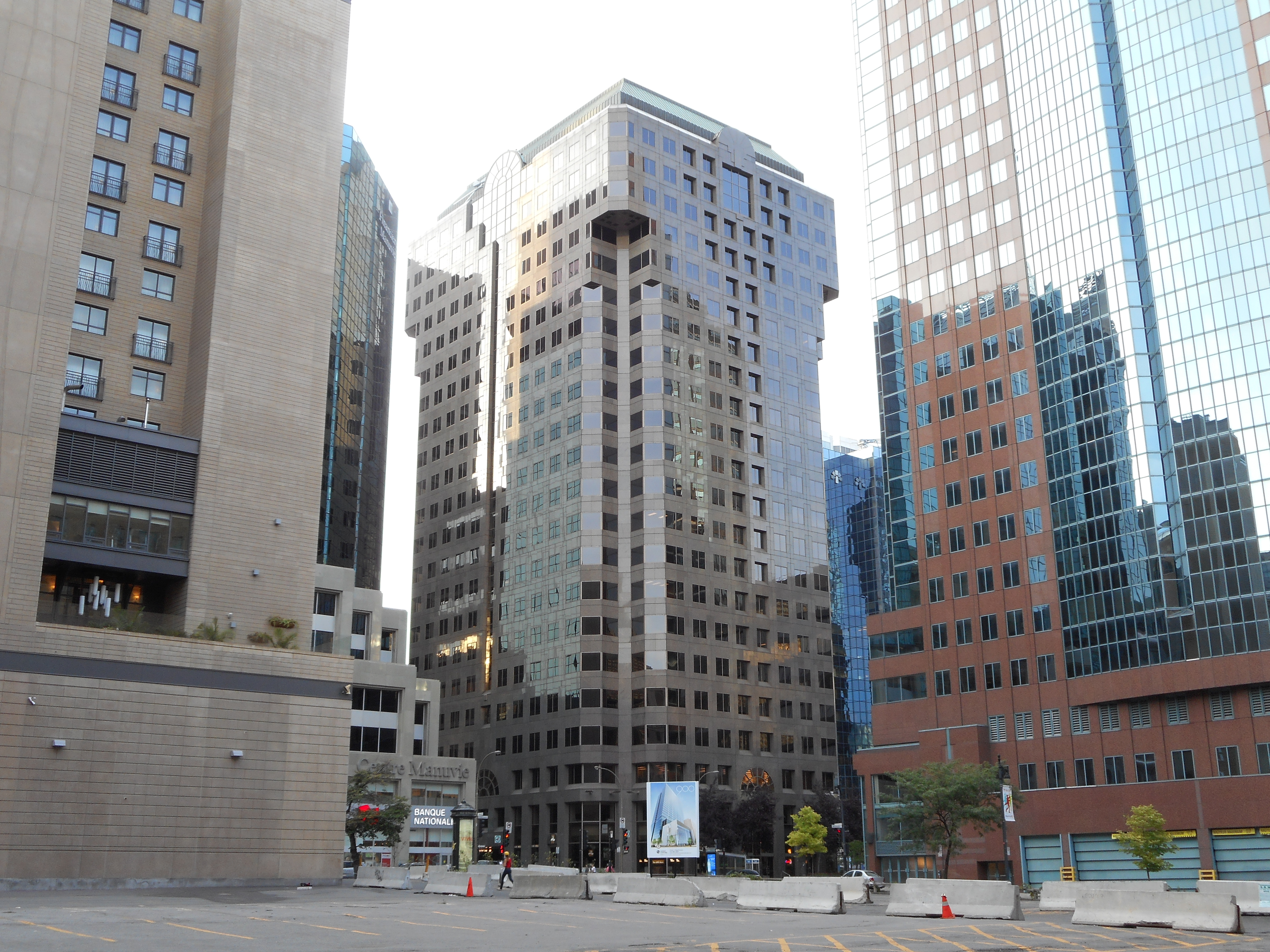
2000 McGill college (left) and Bell Media Tower (right)

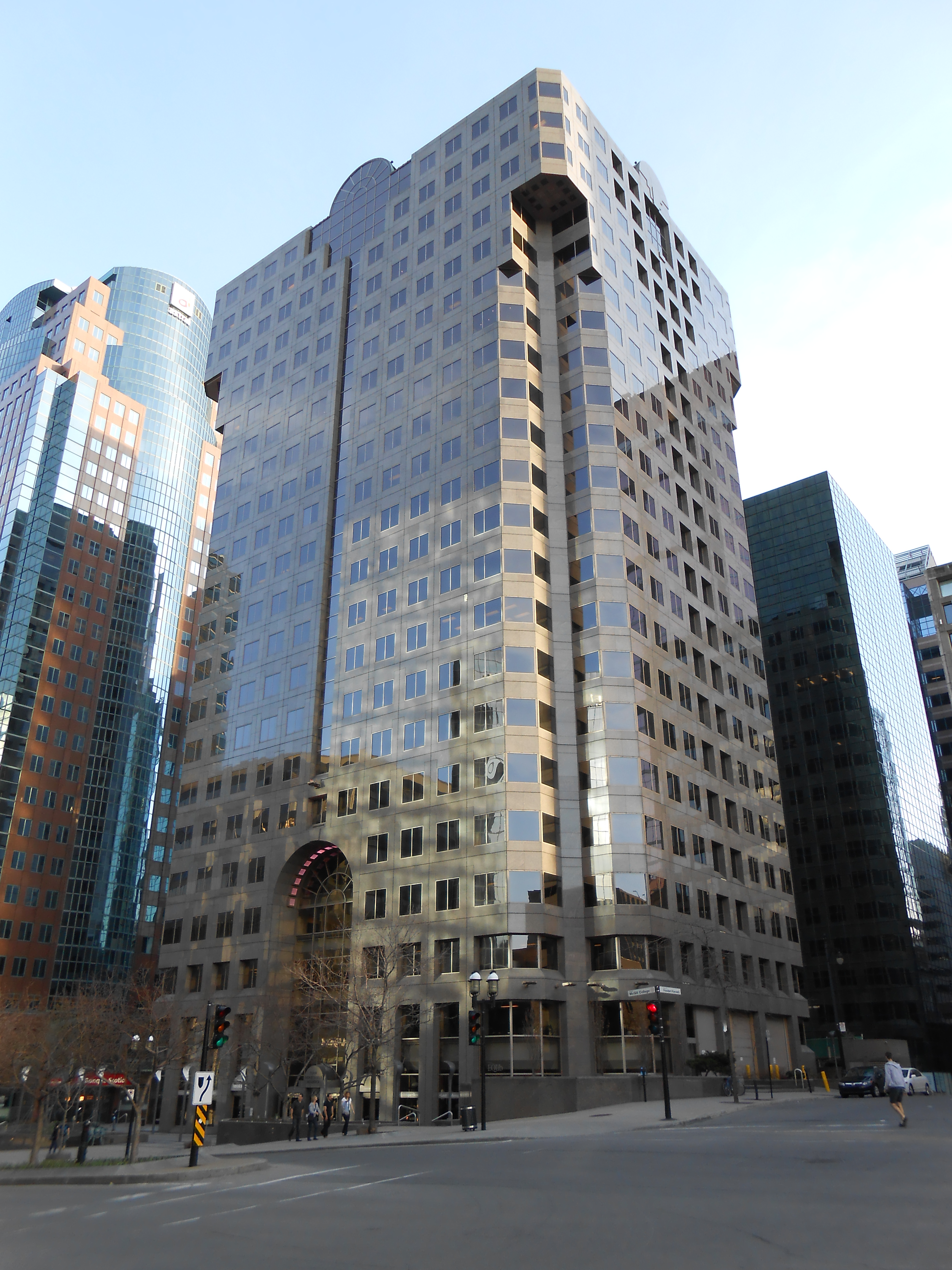
View from the corner of McGill College and President Kennedy

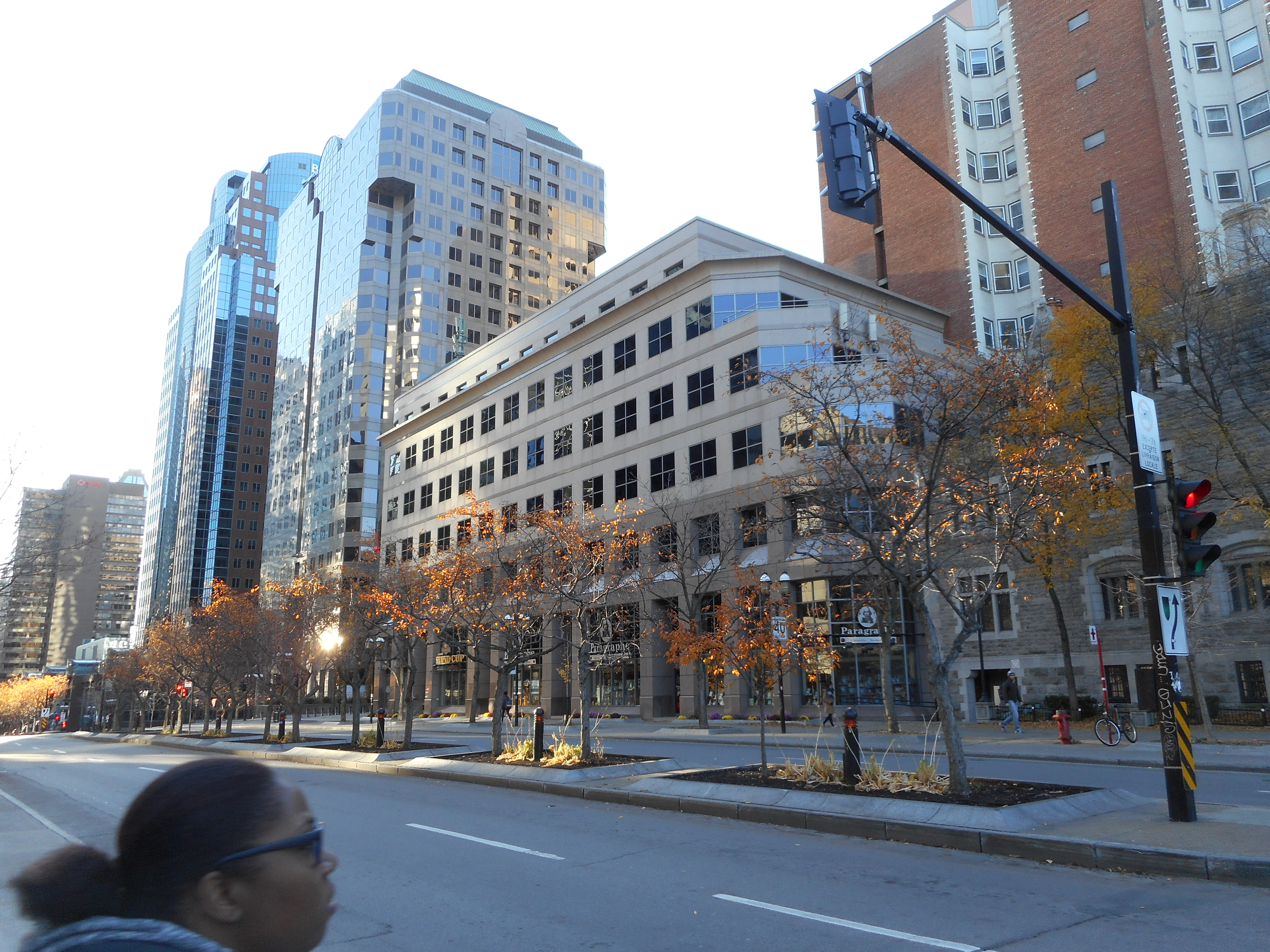

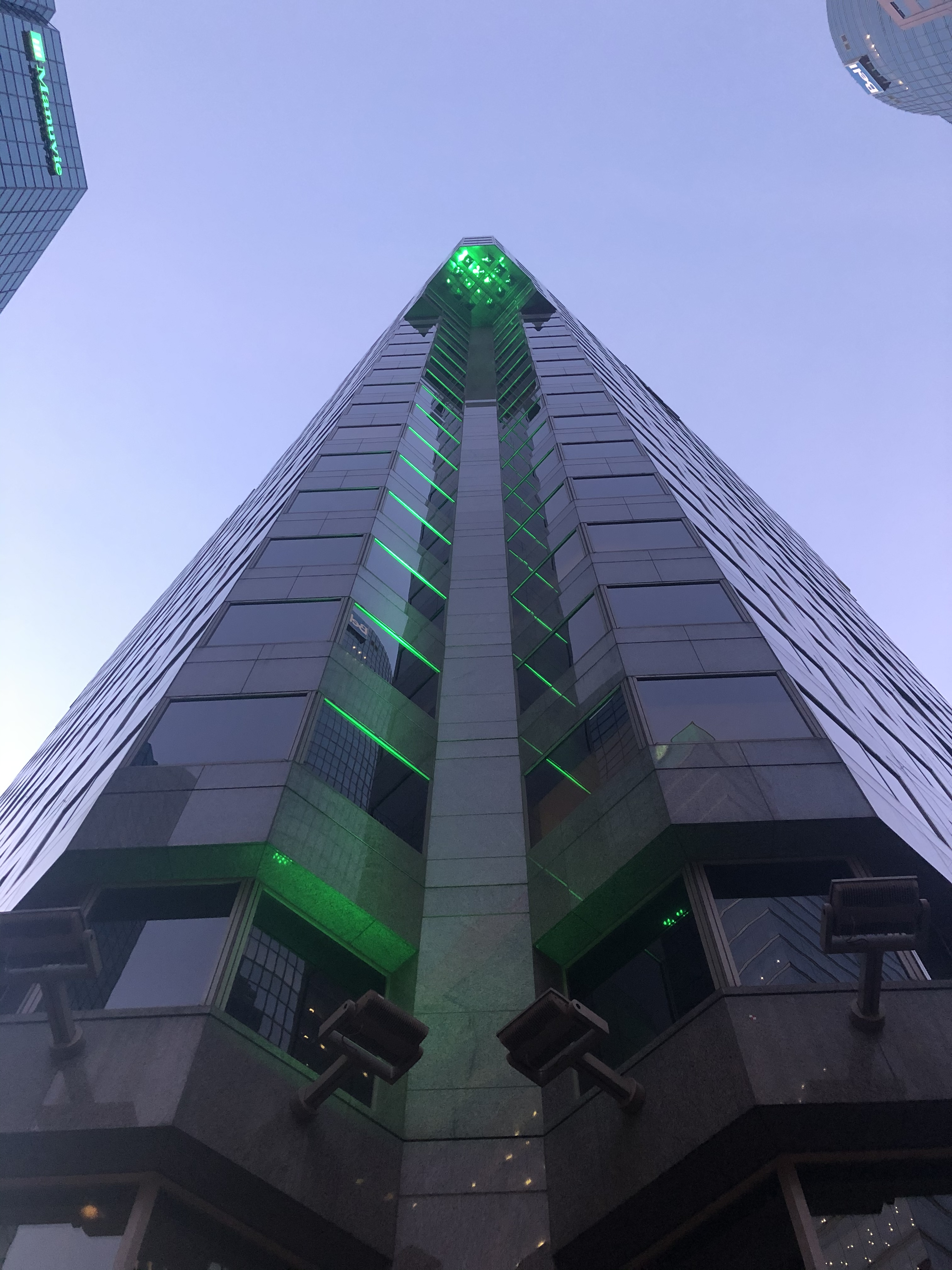

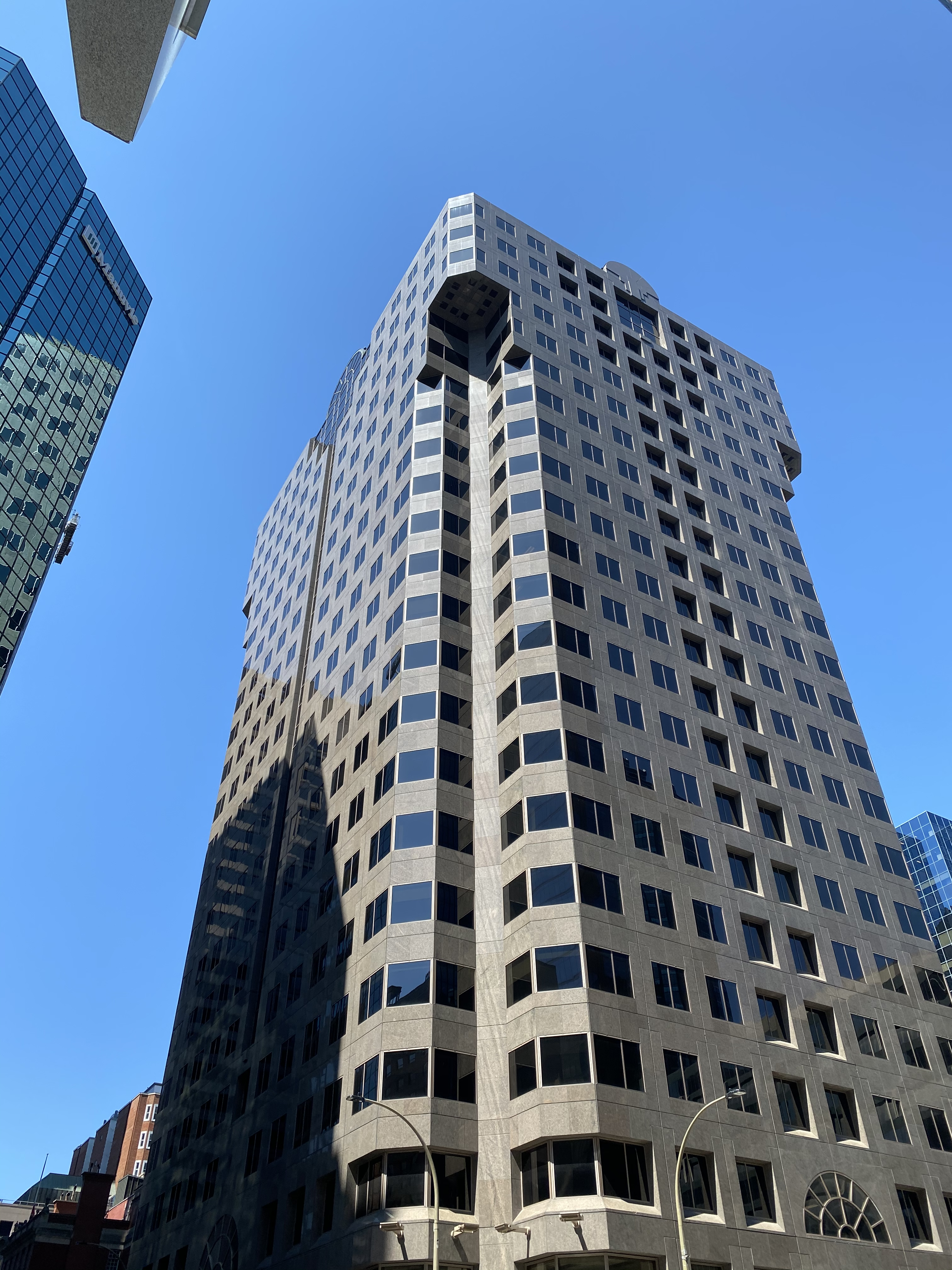
View from Mansfield

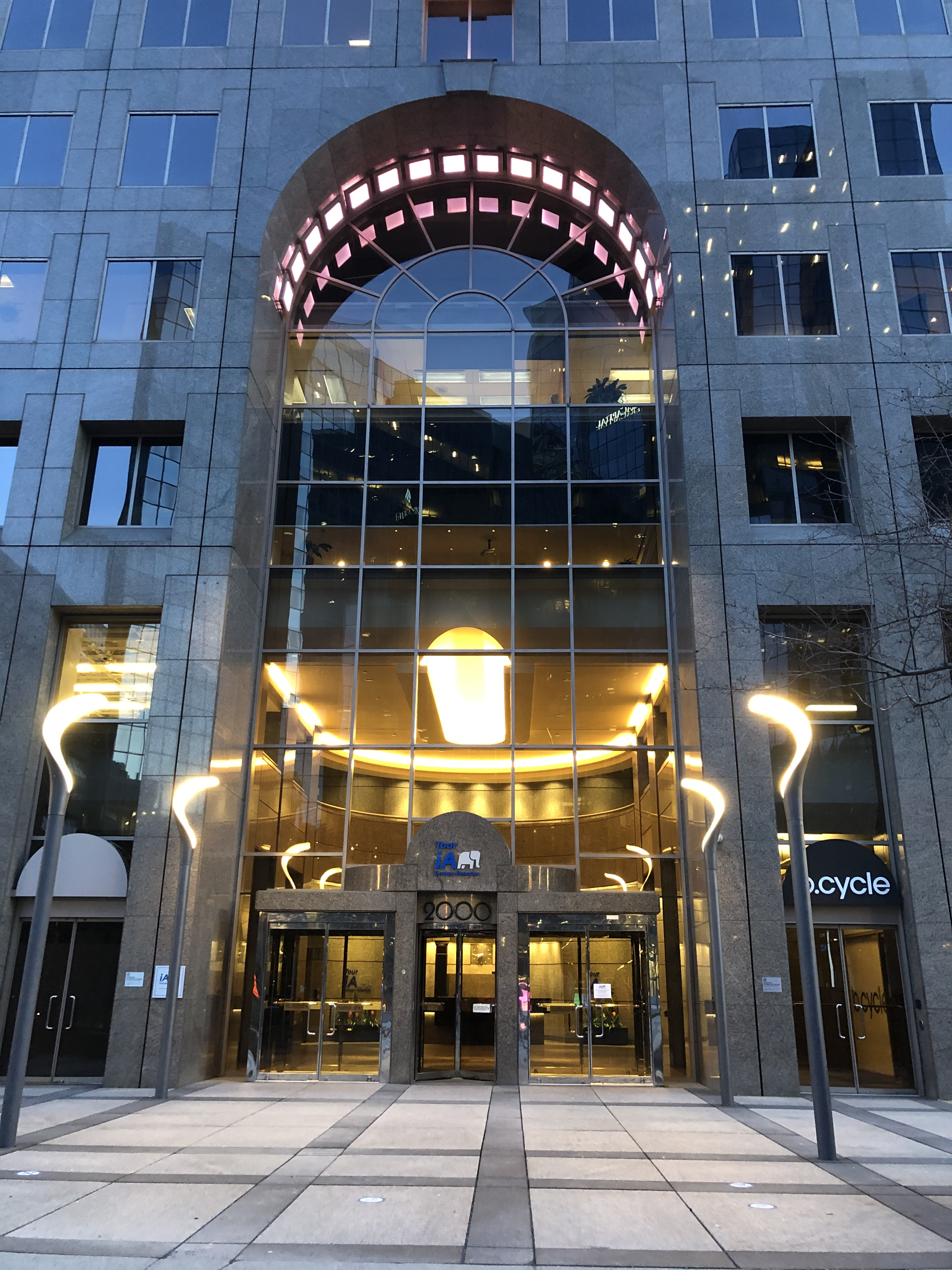
