= Peel station (Montreal Metro) =

Montreal Metro station

Peel

General information
- Location: 1008, 1011, 1115 boul. de Maisonneuve and 1465 Stanley Street; Montreal, Quebec H3A 1T1; Canada
- Coordinates: 45°30′03″N 73°34′29″W
- Operator: Société de transport de Montréal
- Platforms: 2 side platforms
- Tracks: 2
- Connections: STM bus

Construction
- Depth: 10.7 metres (35 feet 1 inch), 49th deepest
- Accessible: No
- Architect: Papineau, Gérin-Lajoie, and Leblanc

Other information
- Fare zone: ARTM: A

History
- Opened: 14 October 1966

Passengers
- 2024: 4,913,551 ▲4.62%
- Rank: 14 of 68

Services
Preceding station	Montreal Metro	Following station
Guy–Concordia toward Angrignon	Green Line	McGill toward Honoré-Beaugrand
Location

Peel station is a Montreal Metro station in the borough of Ville-Marie in Montreal, Quebec, Canada. It is operated by the Société de transport de Montréal (STM) and serves the Green Line. The station opened on October 14, 1966, as part of the original network of the Metro.

== Architecture and art ==
Designed by Papineau, Gérin-Lajoie, and Leblanc, it is a normal side platform station, built in open-cut under boul. De Maisonneuve. Its mezzanine floats within the open-cut volume, supported by pillars and beams, and contains ticket barriers at either end with the fare-paid zone in the centre. There are two entrances at the west end of the station, one with shops and services, and three at the east end, including underground city access to Les Cours Mont-Royal and points east. All of the street entrances are integrated into other buildings.

A circular theme is present throughout the station's decor: there are bright single colour circles on light panels surrounding the advertising posters, circles in the marble of one entrance, circular tiles on the floor and walls, but the best-known works of art in the station, and the main artwork, are a series of 54 large circles (of which 37 remain) by Jean-Paul Mousseau, one of the few artworks to be integrated into the architecture of the original network rather than commissioned later. Created in collaboration with ceramist Claude Vermette, these circles, set in floors and walls throughout the station, are mainly in tones of orange or blue streaked with other colours. A sculpture by Maurice Lemieux entitled Enterspace stands outside the Peel Nord entrance.

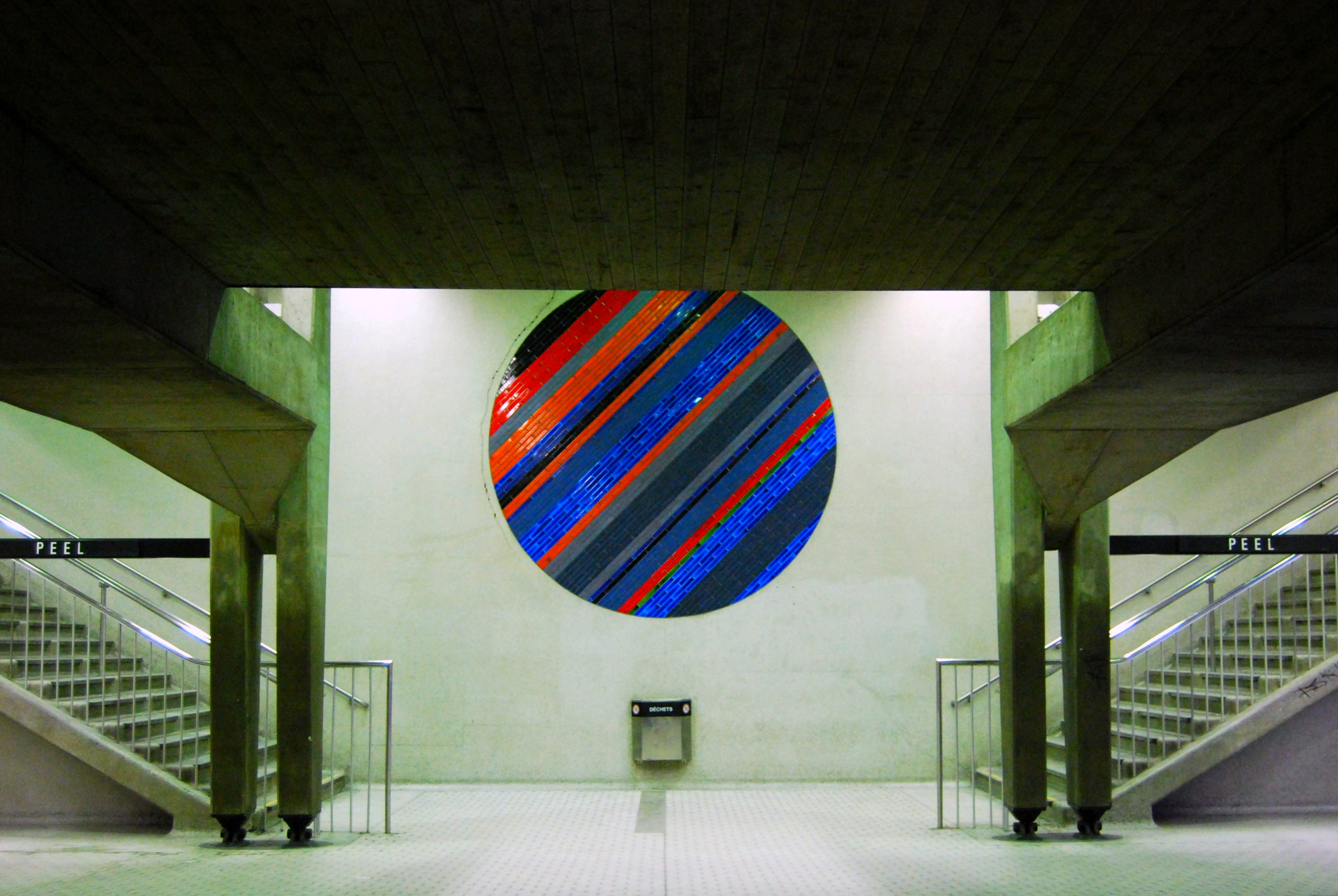
Ceramic Circle by Jean-Paul Mousseau.

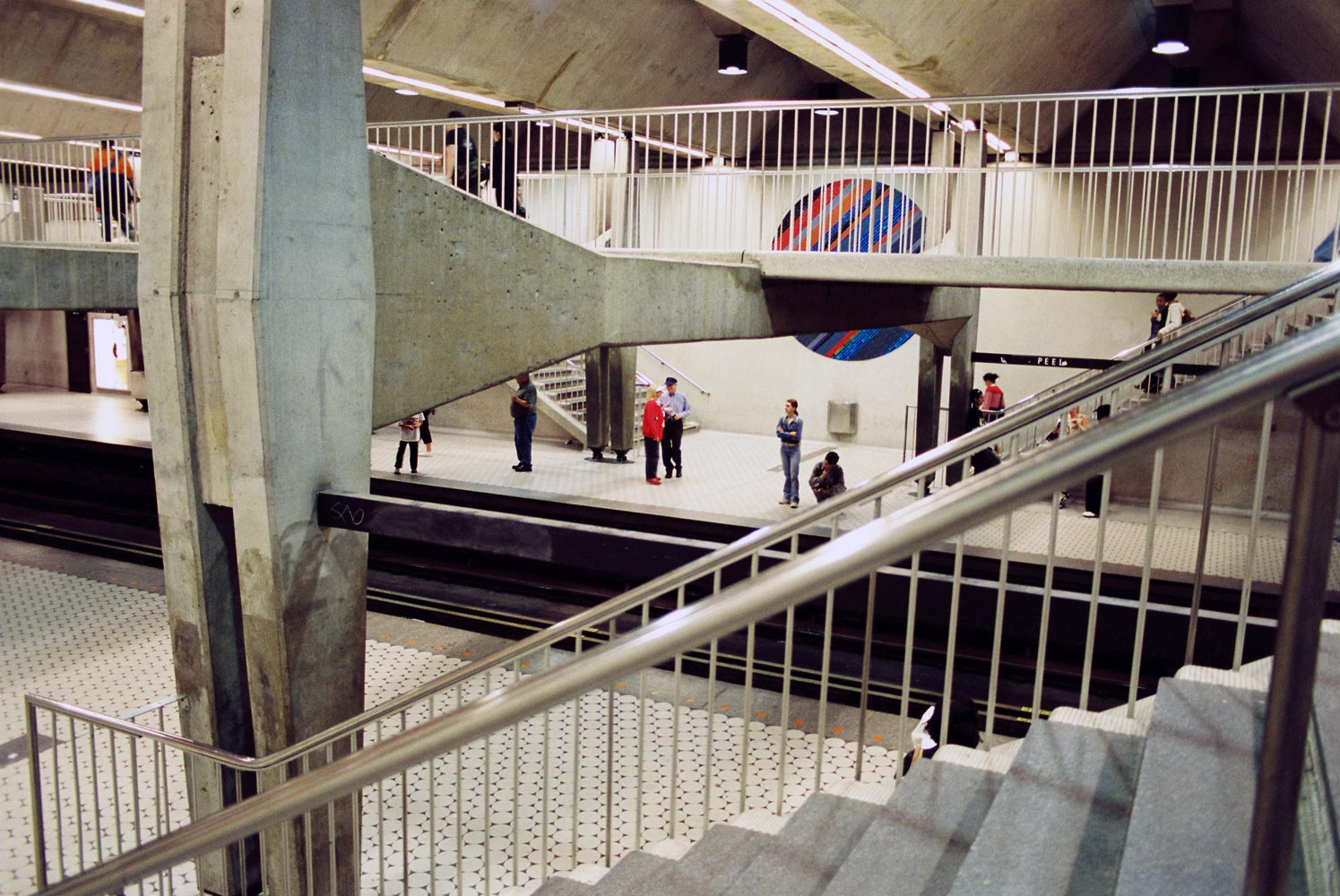
The interior of Peel station and its floating mezzanine.

== Origin of the name ==
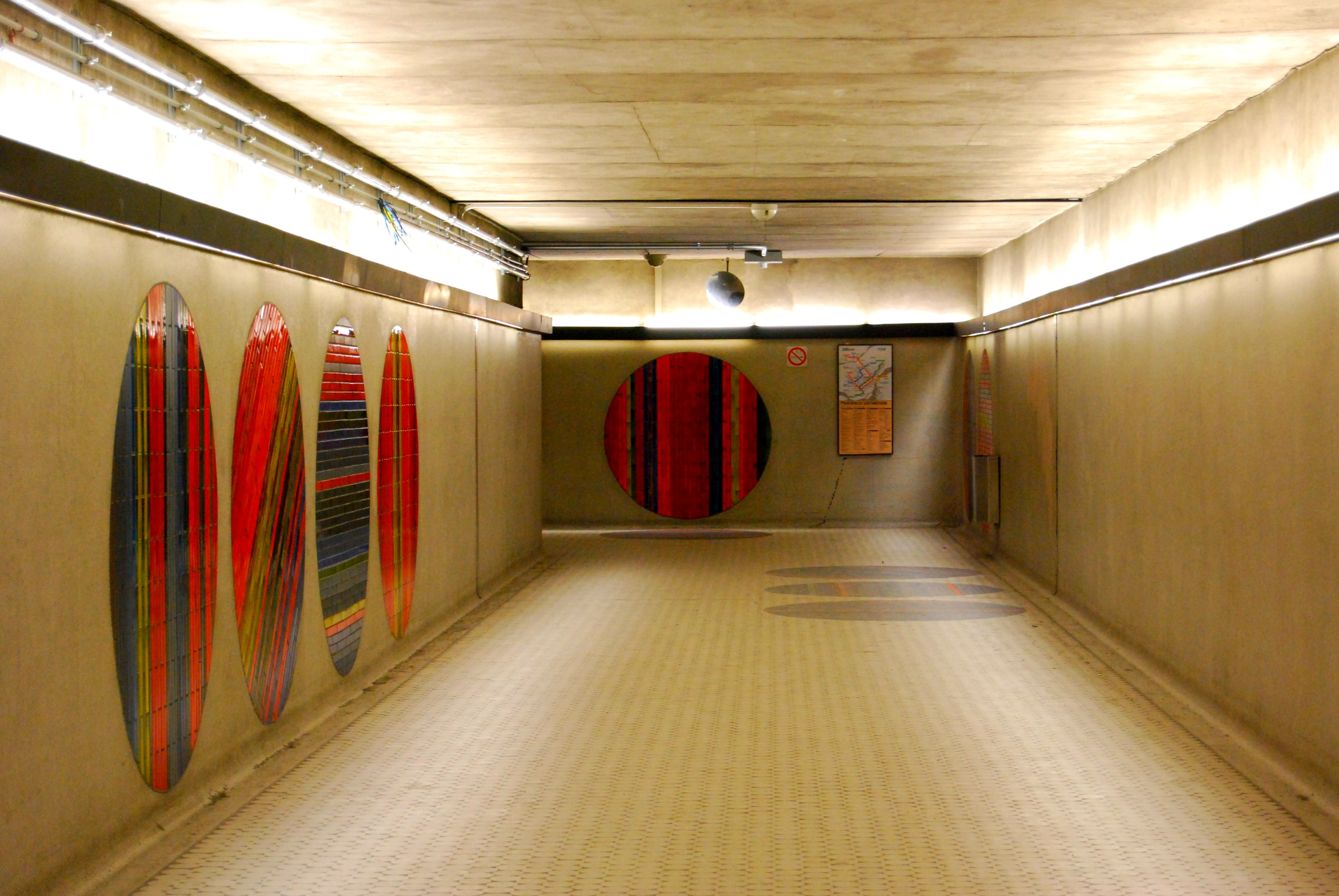
Tunnels at Peel.

The station is named for Peel Street, which in turn was named for Sir Robert Peel, British Prime Minister from 1834 to 1835 and again from 1841 to 1846. He is best known for creating London's police department while Home Secretary, thus giving them their nickname of "Bobbies".

== Connecting bus routes ==
Société de transport de Montréal
No.	Route	Connects to	Service times / notes
50	Vieux-Montréal / Vieux-Port	Gare d'autocars de Montréal; Berri-UQAM; Square-Victoria-OACI	Daily
420	Express Notre-Dame-de-Grâce	McGill; Lucien-L'Allier; Bonaventure; Gare Centrale; Terminus Centre-ville	Weekdays only

== Nearby points of interest ==
- CKMI-DT / Global studios
- Crescent Street (nightclubs, bars, street festivals)
- De Maisonneuve Boulevard
- Dominion Square Building
- Dorchester Square
- Holt Renfrew
- Les Cours Mont-Royal
- McGill University (McLennan Library, Shatner Bldg., etc.)
- Ogilvy's department store
- Redpath Museum
- Sainte-Catherine Street
- Sherbrooke Street
- Sun Life Building
- Tour CIBC
- The Underground City

== Exits ==
- Peel Street (West) Exit: 1115 De Maisonneuve Boulevard West
- Peel Street (East) Exit: 1011 de Maisonneuve Blvd. West
- Metcalfe Street Exit: 1008 de Maisonneuve Blvd. West
- Stanley Street Exit: 1465 Stanley Street
