= Peel Pub =

Restaurant and pub in Montreal, Quebec

- Interactive map of Peel Pub

Restaurant information
- Established: 1962
- Food type: Pub food, pizza
- Location: 1196 Peel Street, Montreal, Quebec, Canada
- Website: peelpubmtl.ca

Peel Pub is a restaurant, pub, and performance venue in downtown Montreal, Quebec, Canada. Located on Peel Street across from Dorchester Square, the establishment is considered a long-standing institution of Montreal's downtown nightlife and student culture.

Founded in 1962, Peel Pub became widely known for its inexpensive food and drink specials, late-night operating hours, oversized pizzas, and popularity among university students, downtown office workers, tourists, and attendees of events at the nearby Bell Centre. The pub was particularly associated with Montreal's anglophone downtown bar scene and developed a reputation as a casual gathering place frequented by generations of residents and visitors.

== History ==
Peel Pub opened in 1962 at 1105 Saint Catherine Street. Despite being located on Saint Catherine Street, the business operated under the name Peel Pub from its opening onward and was located at the corner of Peel Street.

Over the following decades, Peel Pub became a recognizable fixture of downtown Montreal nightlife because of its central location near McGill University, Concordia University, major hotels, office towers, and entertainment venues.

On 21 May 2006, Peel Pub relocated to 1196 Peel Street after more than four decades at its original location. Located across from Dorchester Square, the establishment became widely frequented by students, downtown workers, tourists, and attendees of events at the nearby Bell Centre.

On 13 February 2010, a late-night fire caused approximately $100,000 in damage to the establishment.

In June 2025, Peel Pub closed unexpectedly after more than 60 years of operation, prompting significant media coverage and public nostalgia in Montreal. In March 2026, the Montreal Gazette reported that the establishment was expected to reopen under new ownership by St. Patrick's Day 2026.

== Reputation and cultural significance ==
Peel Pub became known in Montreal for its inexpensive pitchers of beer, oversized pizzas, long operating hours, and informal atmosphere. During the late 20th and early 21st centuries, it was frequently associated with Montreal student nightlife and downtown pub culture.

The establishment also became known as a gathering point before and after concerts, hockey games, and events at the nearby Bell Centre.

Following its 2025 closure, numerous Montreal media outlets and social media users described Peel Pub as a nostalgic landmark of the city's downtown social life.
