= Lion of Belfort (Montreal) =

- Le lion de Belfort
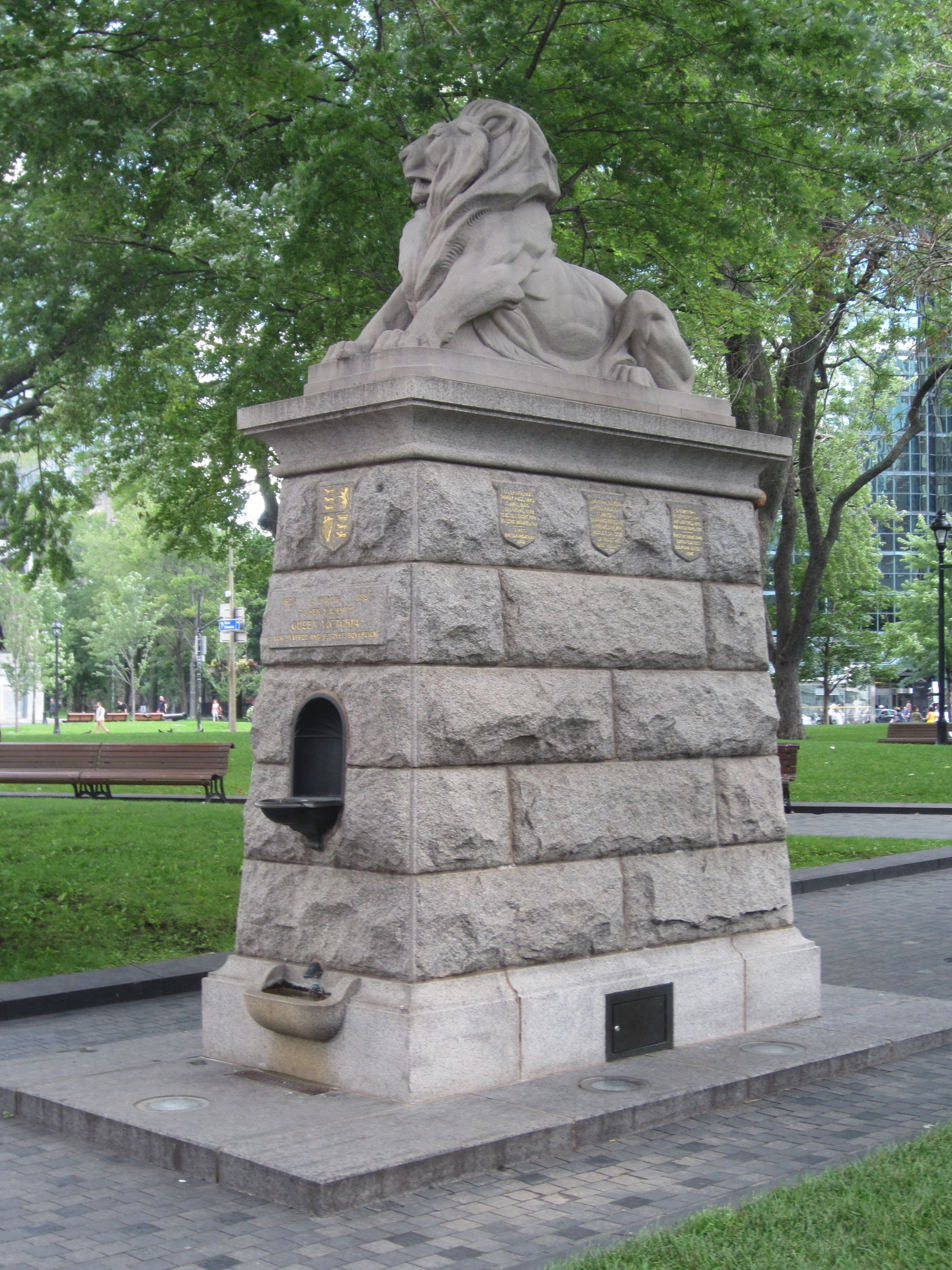
- The monument in 2017
- Interactive map of Lion of Belfort
- Location: Dorchester Square
- Coordinates: 45°29′58.7688″N 73°34′13.2456″W
- Designer: George William Hill (sculpture); Robert Findlay (base)
- Type: Sculpture
- Material: Granite
- Opening date: May 24, 1897
- Dedicated to: Queen Victoria's Diamond Jubilee

The Lion of Belfort (French: Le lion de Belfort) is a monument at Dorchester Square in Downtown Montreal.

== Description and history ==
The Lion of Belfort is a reclining British Imperial Lion, facing east towards France and the United Kingdom. The Lion appears reposed, calm and alert—indicating that the city is safe. The lion was sculpted by George William Hill. As noted on the monument's base, Hill was inspired by the Lion of Belfort, a monumental statue by Frédéric Bartholdi in Belfort, France. The statue's granite base was designed by Scottish-born Montreal architect Robert Findlay. Inaugurated on May 24, 1897, The Lion is placed at the eastern side along Metcalfe and formed the eastern point in the cross. It was initially part of a fountain established for Queen Victoria's Diamond Jubilee by the Sun Life Assurance Company prior to the development of the Sun Life Building.
