= Peel Street (Montreal) =

Thoroughfare in Montreal, Canada

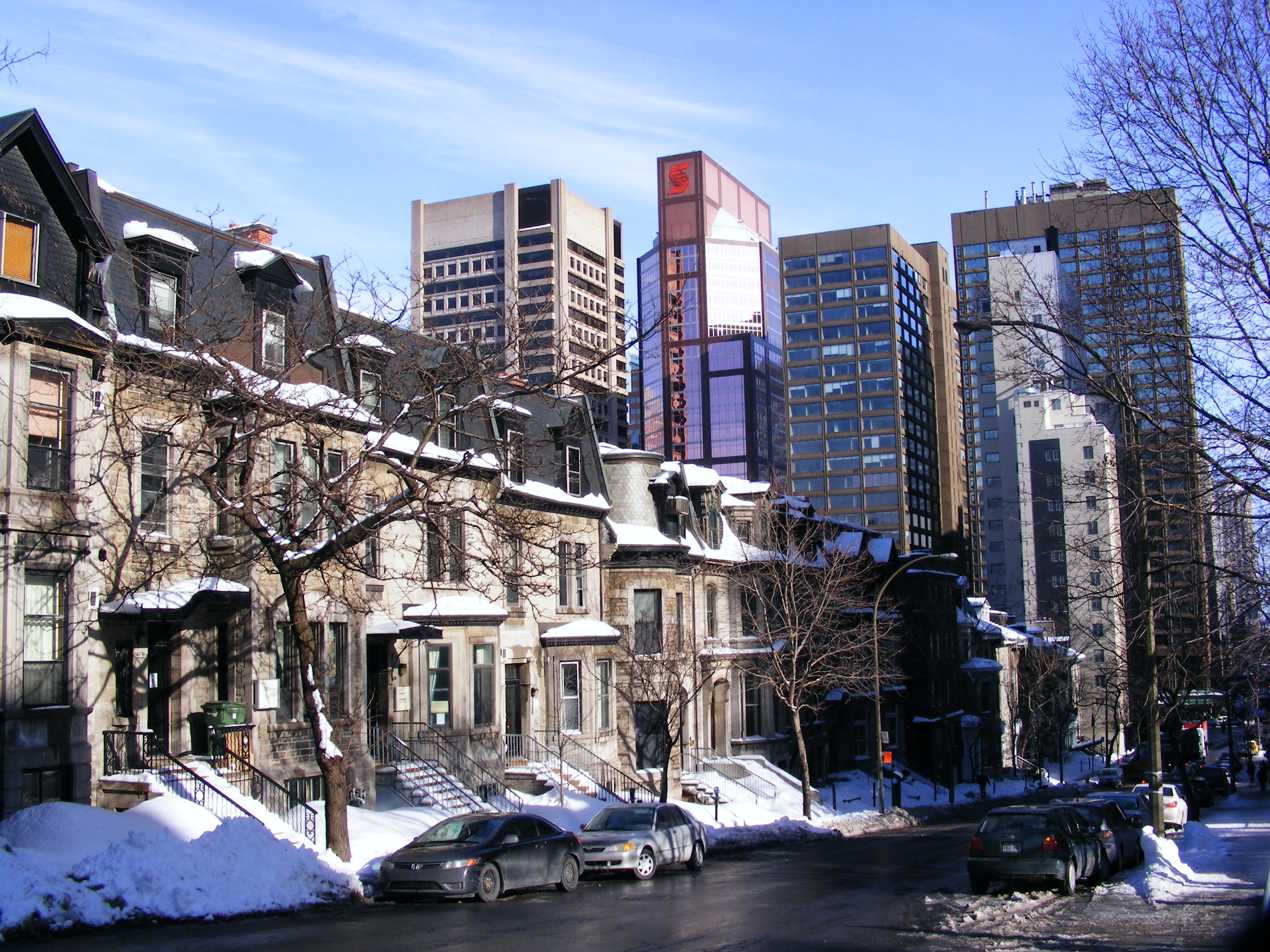
- Peel Street in the Golden Square Mile.
- Interactive map of Peel Street
- Native name: rue Peel (French)
- Former name(s): Windsor Street, Colborne Street, Rue Saint-François-de-Sales
- Length: 2.4 km (1.5 mi)
- Location: Between Pine Avenue and Smith Street
- Coordinates: 45.500414°N 73.57371°W

Construction
- Inauguration: August 23, 1854

Peel Street (officially in French: rue Peel) is a major north–south street located in downtown Montreal, Quebec, Canada. The Street links Pine Avenue, near Mount Royal, in the north and Smith Street, in the Southwest borough, in the south. The street's southern end is at the Peel Basin of the Lachine Canal. The street runs through Montreal's shopping district. The Peel Metro station is named for the street.

== History ==
Inaugurated on August 23, 1854, Peel Street was named after Sir Robert Peel (1788–1850), the former Prime Minister of the United Kingdom. Peel Street was originally a quiet residential street in the Golden Square Mile. Until 1959, Peel was known as Colborne Street south of Notre-Dame Street. Until 1968, the street was known as Windsor Street south of Dorchester Boulevard (today René Lévesque Boulevard).

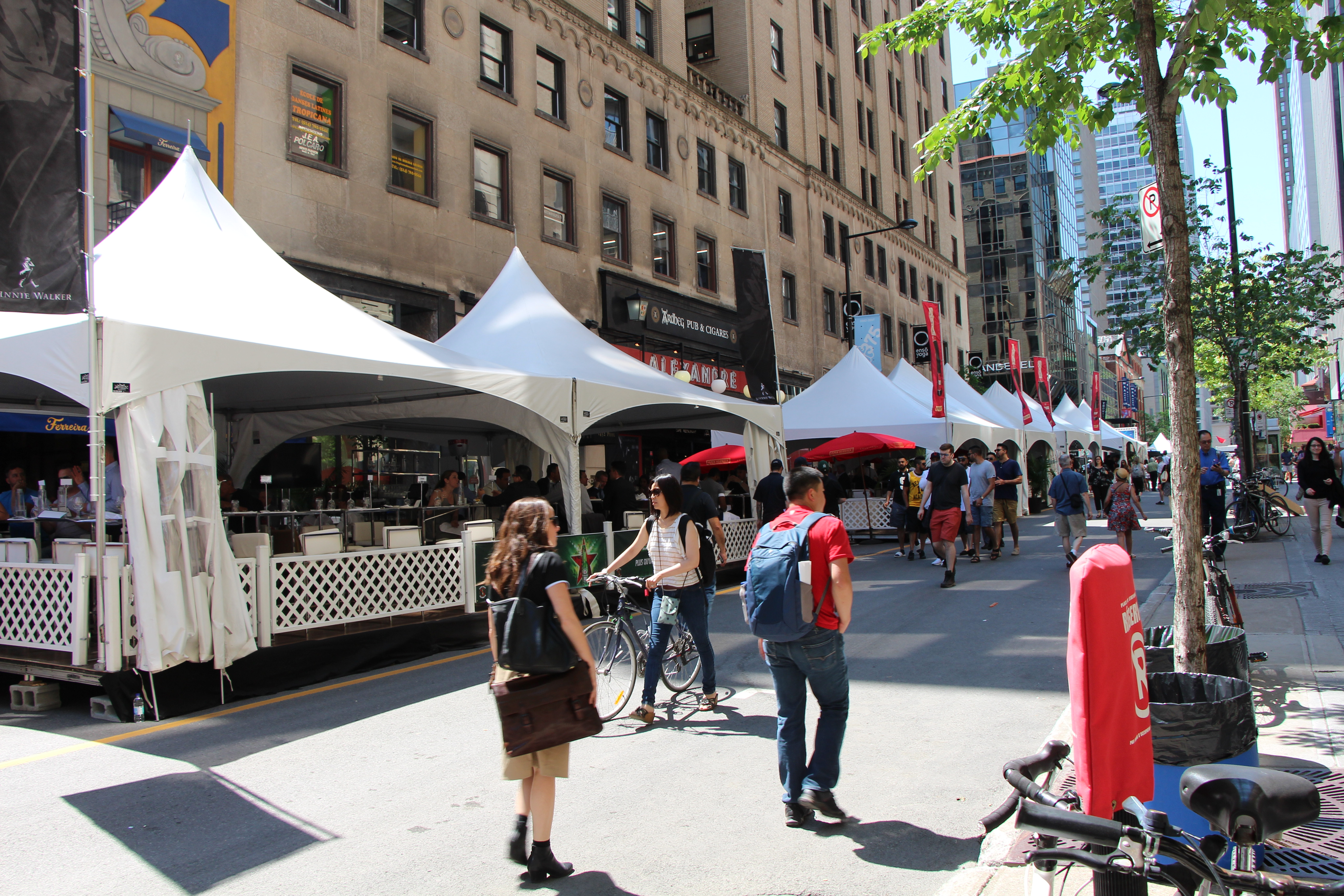
2017 festival

Each June during the weekend of the Canadian Grand Prix, Peel Street becomes host to a street festival known as Formula Peel or The Peel Formula Event. Over 400,000 visitors converge on Peel Street for what organizers call "the most prestigious event in downtown Montreal".

== Route description ==
Between Pine Avenue and Doctor Penfield Avenue in the Golden Square Mile, Peel Street is lined by former mansions converted into McGill University buildings. South of Doctor Penfield Avenue and north of Sherbrooke Street West, Peel is lined by residential towers on the western side of the street, including Le Cartier Apartments and Victorian row houses on the eastern side. The Consulate General of Pakistan is located in one of the row houses.

Between Sherbrooke Street West and De Maisonneuve Boulevard West, Peel is home to a few hotels and office buildings. The Montreal Amateur Athletic Association, Canada's oldest athletics association is located on this segment.

South of De Maisonneuve but north of Saint Catherine Street West, Peel is bordered on the east side by Les Cours Mont-Royal (formerly the Mount Royal Hotel, on a site previously occupied for many years by the High School of Montreal), and various small shops and restaurants on the west side. McGill University's Martlet House is located on this portion of the street, and was once home to the headquarters for Seagram.

Between Saint Catherine and René Lévesque Boulevard West, Peel is home to several pubs and restaurants on the western side including Peel Pub. Also on the western side of this segment is the Windsor Hotel and the Tour CIBC. On the eastern side is the Dominion Square Building and Dorchester Square (formerly known as Dominion Square).

South of Réné Lévesque Blvd. and north of De la Gauchetière Street/Canadiens de Montréal Avenue, is the Édifice La Laurentienne and St. George's Anglican Church on the western side of the street, and Place du Canada on the eastern side.

Between De la Gauchètière and Saint Antoine Street West, Peel borders Windsor Station on the western side and the Chateau Champlain and the Place du Canada office building on the eastern side.

South of Saint Antoine and north of Saint Jacques Street, Peel is bordered by a former Canada Post building on the eastern side, and parking lots on the western side.

Between Saint Jacques and Notre Dame Street West, Peel is bordered by the former Dow Planetarium on the eastern side and École de technologie supérieure's Pavillon B on the western side.

South of Notre Dame to William Street, in the Griffintown neighbourhood, Peel is bordered by École de technologie supérieure's A Pavilion on the western side, and a few former brick industrial buildings on the eastern side.

Below William Street to the Lachine Canal, Peel is lined by a mix of condominium towers, as well as a few businesses.

== Transport ==
The Peel station on the Montreal Metro's Green Line is located on the corner of Peel and De Maisonneuve Blvd. West, and opened on October 14, 1966.

Peel Street is served by the Societé de transport de Montréal's 107 Verdun bus route, which runs the entire length of the street from Pine Avenue to Wellington Street.

A proposed Montreal Tramway line would use Peel Street for a portion of its route.

== "Jurassic Peel" ==
In 2019, fresh off of co-hosting the Formula 1 Canadian Grand Prix Festival with Crescent Street, festival organizers kept the street closed to host a massive viewing party for Game 5 of the 2019 NBA Finals, involving Canada's sole NBA team, the Toronto Raptors, and the Golden State Warriors. The announcement came at late notice but was welcomed by many Montrealers, including the Peel Street Merchants' Organization. Dubbed "Jurassic Peel", it was a success for the area and it returned for Game 6.
