= Les Cours Mont-Royal =

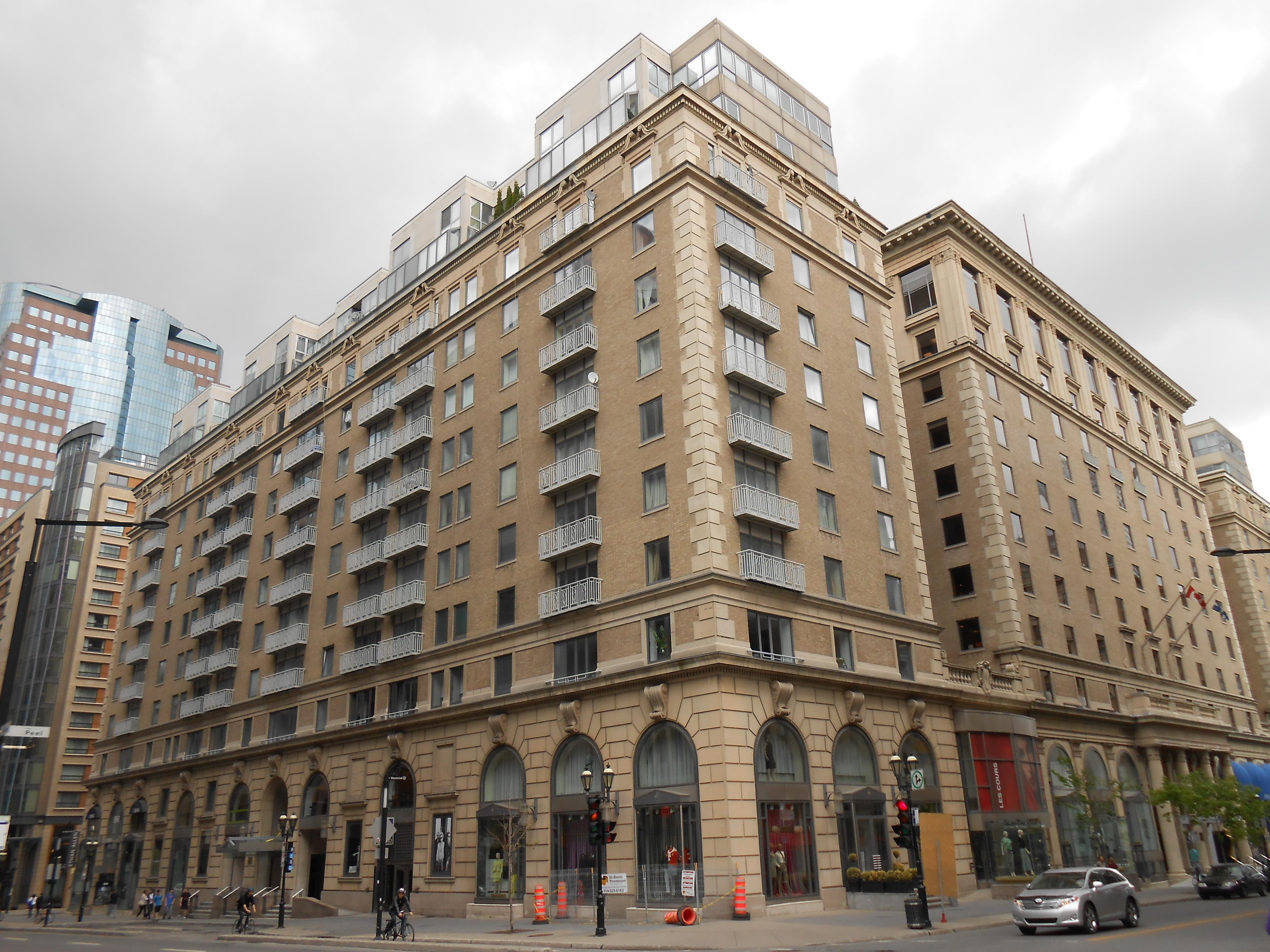
- Les Cours Mont-Royal, from Peel Street
- Coordinates: 45°30′03″N 73°34′25″W
- Address: 1455, rue Peel; Montreal, Quebec; H3A 1T5
- Opened: 1988
- Manager: Soltron Group
- Owner: Soltron Group
- Architect: Ross and Macdonald
- Num. of stores: 49
- Floors: 4
- Public transit: at Peel; Peel
- Website: www.lcmr.ca

Les Cours Mont-Royal is an upscale shopping mall in the downtown core of Montreal, Quebec, Canada, which was converted from the former Mount Royal Hotel.

== Architecture ==
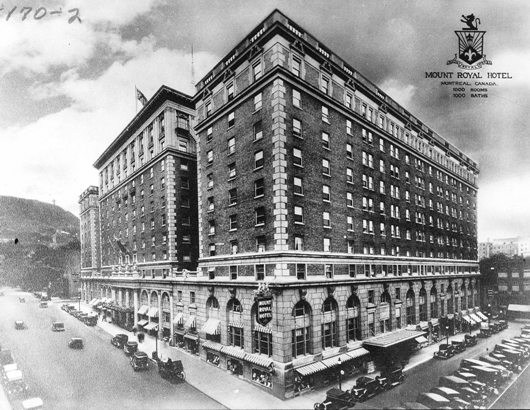
The Mount Royal Hotel in 1930.

The Mount Royal Hotel was designed by Ross and Macdonald, a prolific architectural firm in Montreal and across Canada. The ten-storey, 1036-room hotel was the largest in the British Empire. It was erected on the former site of the High School of Montreal at 1455 Peel Street. The construction of the Mount Royal Hotel in the Beaux-Arts architectural style was part of a larger trend in what was the largest city in Canada to attract high-class tourists with luxurious edifices. Other famous buildings by Ross and Macdonald in Montreal include Holt Renfrew, the Montreal Neurological Institute, the downtown Eaton's building (now Complexe les Ailes), the Dominion Square Building and Trinity Memorial Church in Westmount.

== History ==
The hotel opened on December 20, 1922, managed by the United Hotels Company. It was sold by its owners, Cardy Hotels, to Sheraton Hotels in 1950, along with the company's other Canadian properties in Quebec and Ontario. The hotel was renamed the Sheraton-Mt. Royal Hotel in 1951. The hotel left Sheraton on March 31, 1982, when the nearby Le Centre Sheraton Hotel opened to replace it. The Mt. Royal Hotel closed on November 17, 1984.

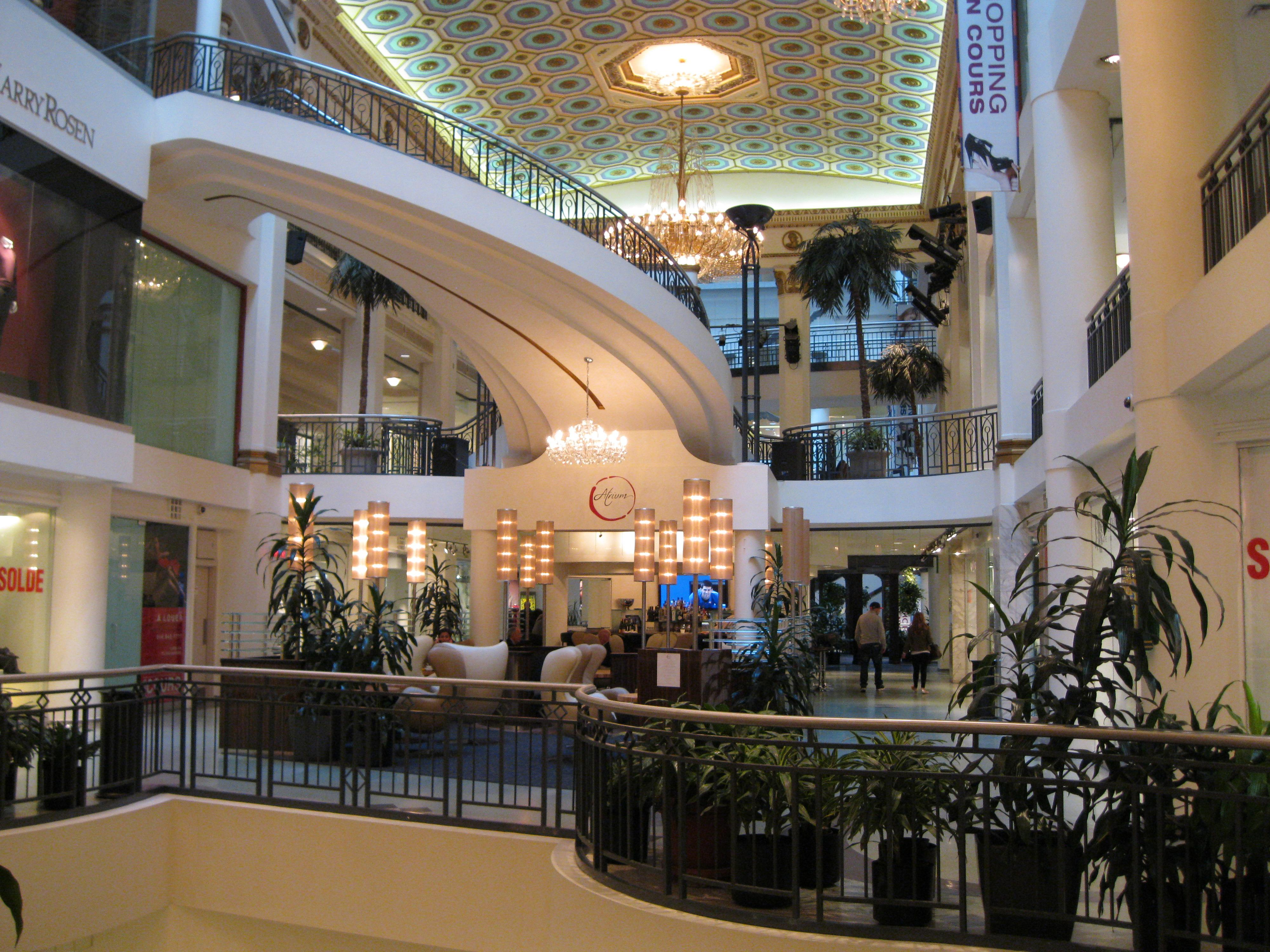
The former hotel lobby and chandelier within the current mall

The building was gutted and renovated at a cost of $140 million and converted to a mixed-use complex with a shopping mall in the lower levels and basement, connected to the Underground City, and offices above. It reopened in 1988 as Les Cours Mont-Royal. The only interior remnant of the original hotel is the original lobby, which contains a huge chandelier taken from the Monte Carlo casino. The shopping area is organized around four large courts, hence the French name "Les Cours". Under the main skylight there are six bird-human sculptures by the Inuk artist David Ruben Piqtoukun.

== Tenants and facilities ==
The top of the building has several floors of luxury condos. They have separate elevators and entrances, set apart from those of the shopping centre's street doors and subway tunnels. In between the top condo levels and the mall at the base there are several floors of office space.

Les Cours Mont-Royal Shopping Centre is mainly composed of fashion retailers, with a few additional features and services including Montreal's largest spa (Spa Diva), a medical clinic (Les Cours Medical Centre) and a catwalk for fashion shows and other events.

It is connected via the underground city to Peel metro station.
