= Dorchester Square =

Square in downtown Montreal, Quebec, Canada

Dorchester Square French: Square Dorchester
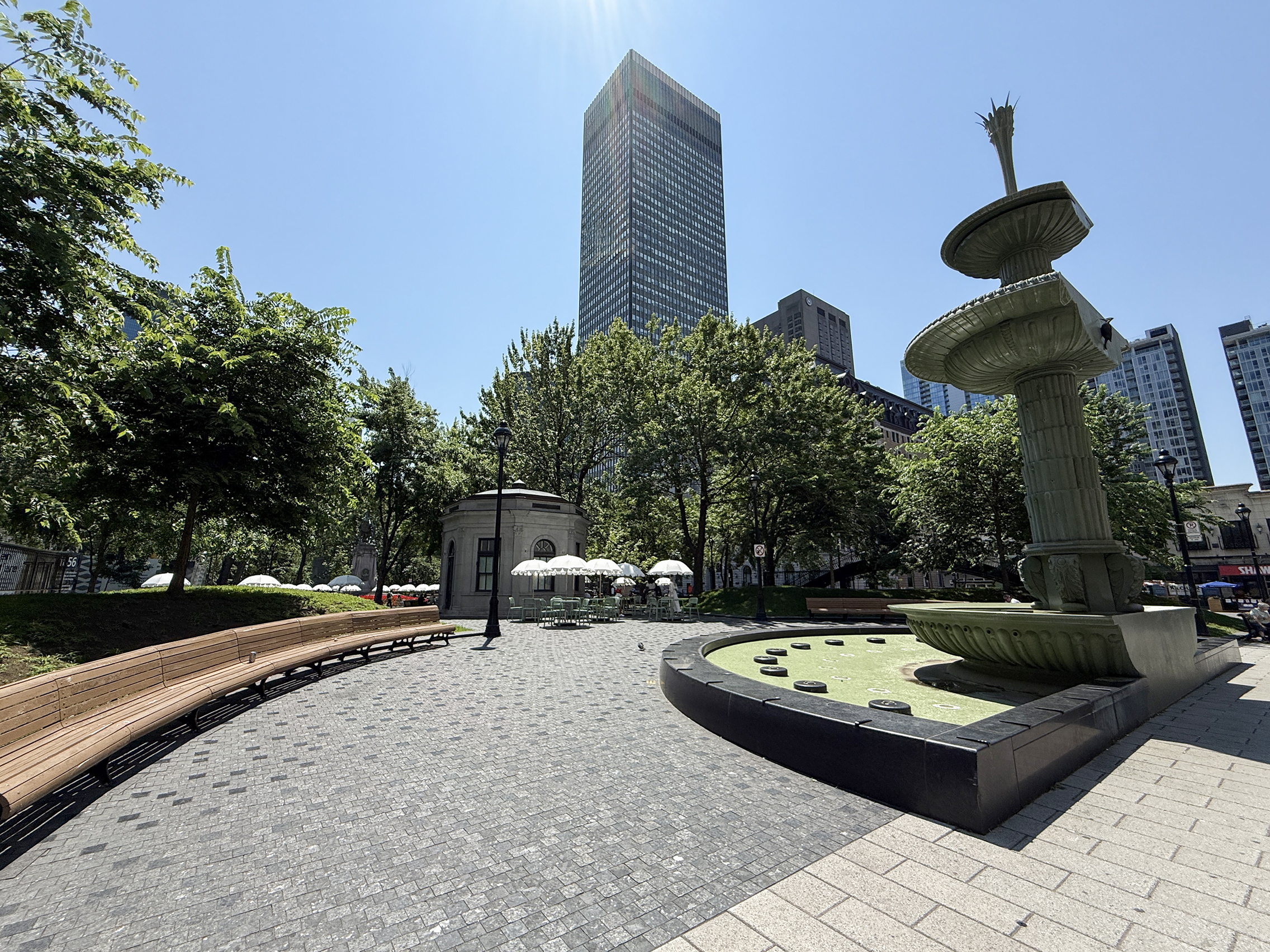
- Dorchester Square in 2026

- Location within Montreal
- Type: Town square
- Location: Downtown Montreal, Ville-Marie Montreal, Quebec, Canada
- Coordinates: 45°29′58.6248″N 073°34′15.4884″W
- Area: 2.1 hectares (5.19 acres)
- Created: 1876
- Operator: City of Montreal
- Status: Open all year

Dorchester Square (French: Square Dorchester), originally Dominion Square (French: Square Dominion), is a large urban square in downtown Montreal. Together with Place du Canada, the area is just over 21,000 m^{2} (230,000 sq ft) or 2.1 ha of manicured and protected urban parkland bordered by René Lévesque Boulevard to the south, Peel Street to the west, Metcalfe Street to the east and Dominion Square Building to the north. The square is open to the public 24 hours a day and forms a focal point for pedestrian traffic in the city. Until the creation of Place du Canada in 1967, the name "Dominion Square" had been applied to the entire area.

Land acquisition to build the square began in 1872 and the site was inaugurated in 1878, though it was not thoroughly completed until 1892. The square has four statues that were originally arranged in the form of a Union Jack. In 2010, $14-million was spent on a redesign, with the removal of a flower stand on the southwest corner, all monuments refurbished, new street furniture added and a lighting scheme which has greatly improved the look of the square after dark. As a nod to the fact that it was once a cemetery, small crosses have been embedded in the walkways. In addition, some lights are pointed to shine on the foliage of the many trees, allowing for an interesting nocturnal green glow in the summer. A planned renovation of Place du Canada has begun with renovations to the John A. Macdonald monument and the Cenotaph. A further renovation of Dorchester Square Street (including the bus/taxi parking area, subterranean garage entrance and exit and the kiosk) is planned, and it is possible that the square may be expanded with Dorchester Square Street converted for pedestrian use.

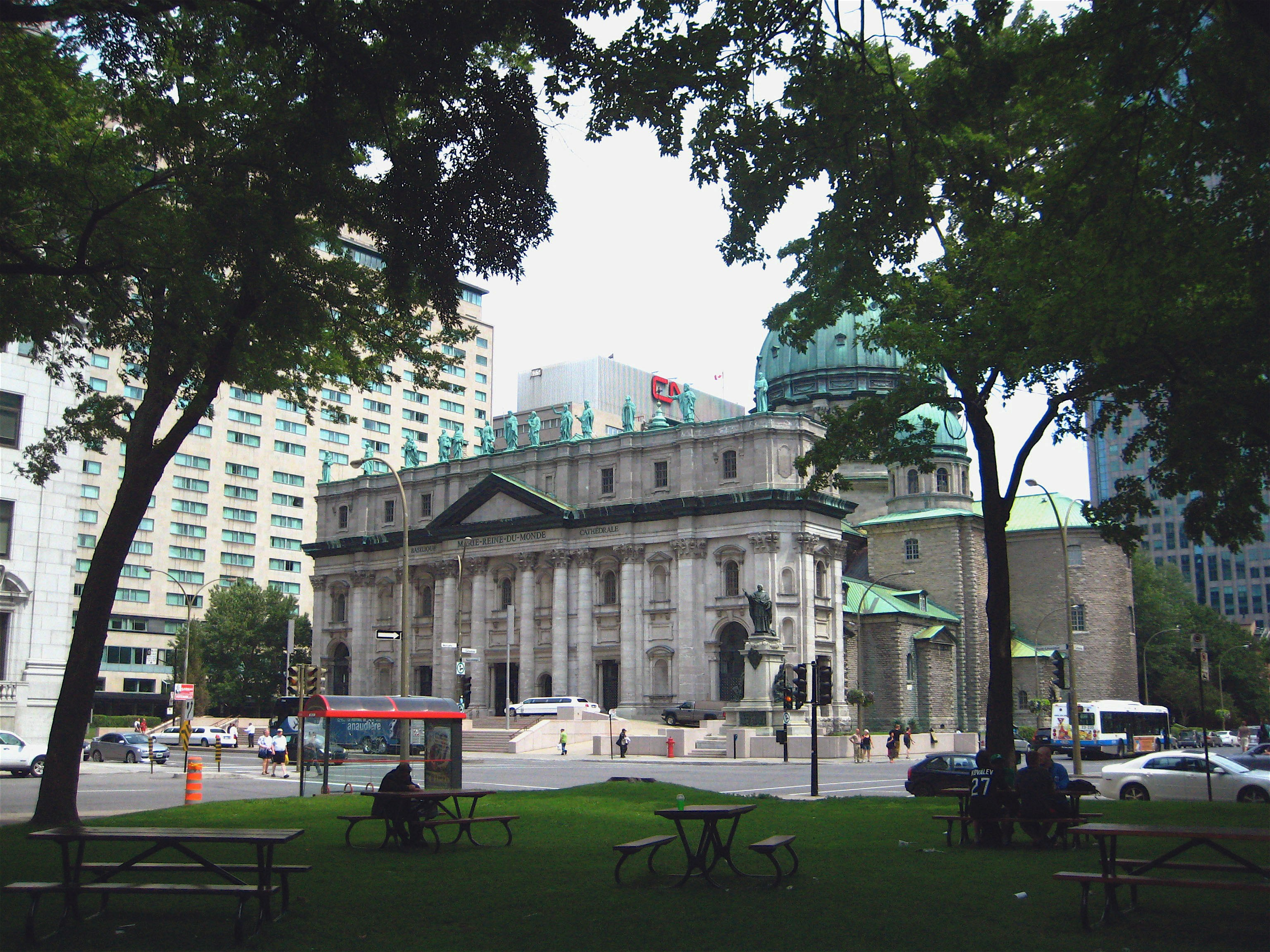
Mary, Queen of the World Cathedral from interior of Dorchester Square

== History ==
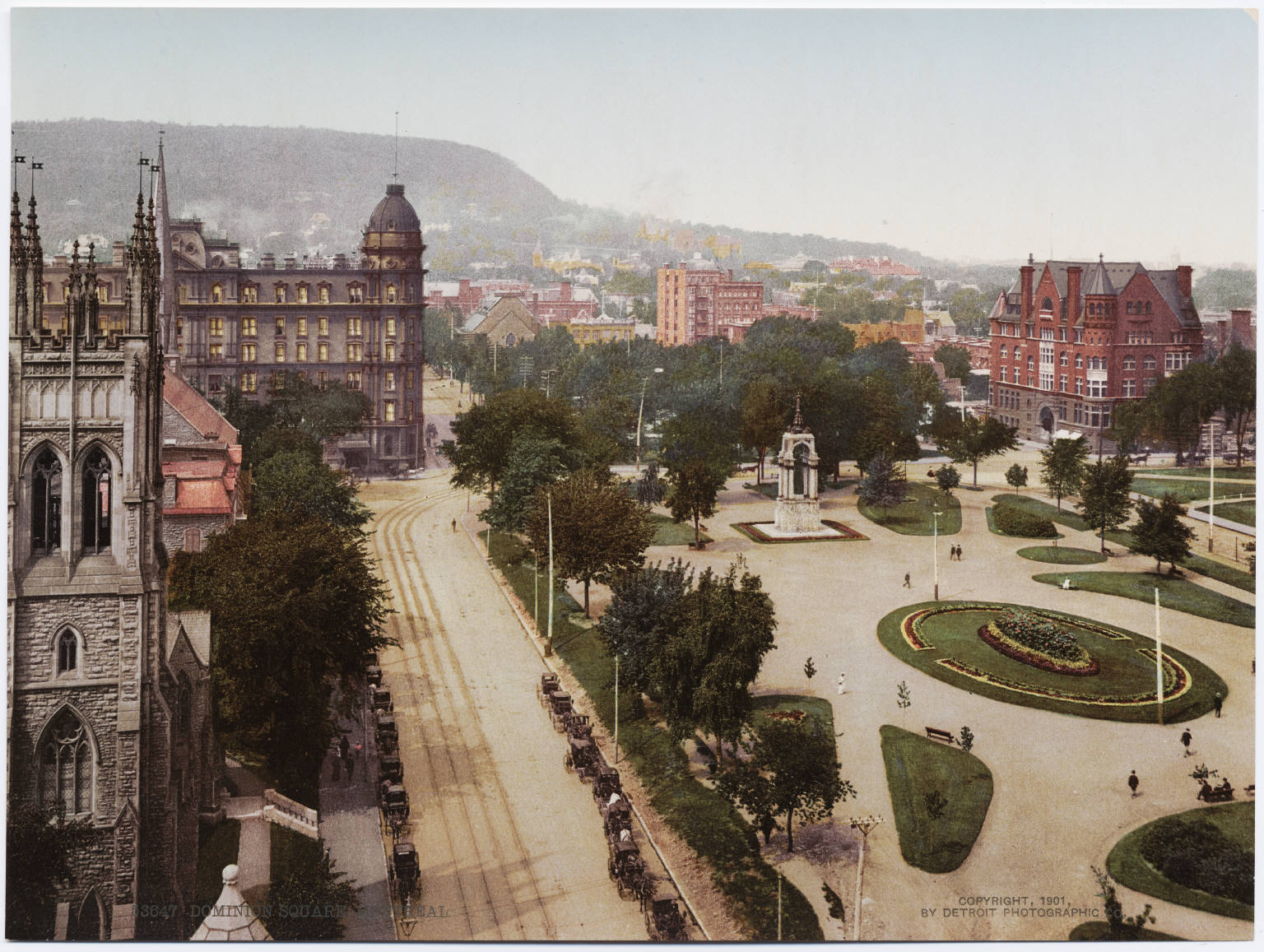
Dominion Square, c. 1900

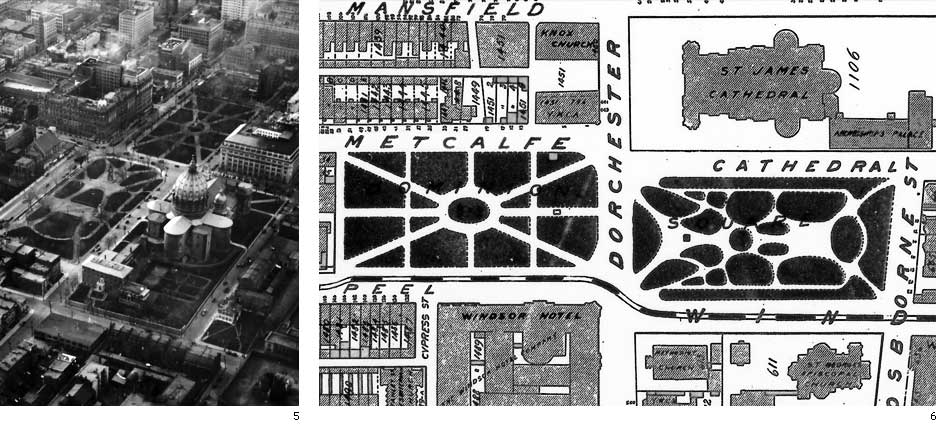
Dominion Square in 1927 and City Plan 1907

Up until 1854, the square was little more than a public green and an informal meeting place. Much of it was used for the Catholic Sainte-Antoine Cemetery, a hastily arranged cemetery for the victims of the 1851 Cholera Epidemic. In that year, the bodies were exhumed and moved to Notre-Dame-des-Neiges Cemetery on the northwestern side of Mount Royal. In 1869, St. George's Anglican Church was erected at the corner of Peel and De la Gauchetière. It spawned the construction of several other Protestant churches and cathedrals in and around Dominion Square, which was beginning to take form as a dividing line between the estates and suburbs of the northwest and the retail and commercial areas to the east and southeast. The 1870s provided several massive projects which made the green a central meeting point and prestige address that formalized the use of the square. Land acquisition began in 1872 and the park took its present form in 1878. Simultaneously, the Catholic Archdiocese began construction of Mary, Queen of the World Cathedral across from the southeast corner of the square. On the western side of the square, the Windsor Hotel was completed by 1878. With such prestigious construction and massive human traffic, the square became a vital component of the urban environment and a focal point for transit between the office and commercial sectors and the retail and suburban sectors.

In 1889, the Canadian Pacific Railway constructed Windsor Station on the south side of De la Gauchetière Street, opposite St. George's Cathedral. This further increased the importance of the square as a major focal point. Later construction would involve the demolition of the original YMCA Building (1851) on the east side of the square in order to allow the construction of the first portion of the Sun Life Building at the corner of Metcalfe Street and Dorchester Boulevard, which would grow to take up the entire eastern side of the square by 1931. In 1929, the northern side of the square was graced with the Dominion Square Building, designed as an integrated shopping arcade and office tower. The arcade was specifically designed to draw pedestrian traffic between the square and St. Catherine St.

Additional construction after the Second World War saw the development of the Laurentian Hotel across from the southwest corner of the square. In 1960, the original southern section of the Windsor Hotel was demolished in order to build the CIBC Tower. The 1960s also saw major developments as Dominion Square became the central orienting point for the new downtown of modernist skyscrapers. As such, a skywalk was erected on the south side of the square, across De la Gauchetière to Place du Canada and the Chateau Champlain hotel.

In 1967, Dominion Square was divided into two parts, the southern portion being renamed Place du Canada while the northern portion retained the name Dominion Square.

After the death of René Lévesque in 1987, Dorchester Boulevard was renamed in his honour and Dominion Square was renamed "Dorchester Square", after Guy Carleton, 1st Baron Dorchester, who supported the rights of French speakers in British North America.

In 2015, Claude Cormier + associes restored the northern end of the park, in the process adding a 30-foot (9.1 m) steel fountain inspired by those from the Victorian era. The city advised Cormier to omit the fountain to make room for tourist buses, but Cormier instead opted to "slice" off a portion of the fountain and replace it with 19-inch (48 cm) sculpture of a pileated woodpecker.

== Monuments and their significance ==
There are four principal monuments in Dorchester Square, originally arranged to form an equilateral cross with the 'Camellienne' (a multi-purpose kiosk that currently houses a snack bar) at the northern point. However, the cross form was altered first when the Lion of Belfort fountain was disconnected and moved further south along Metcalfe Street. Later, a florist was established at the southwestern corner, further altering the original layout of the square. Under the current renovation plan, the Robert Burns statue will be moved further north along Peel Street and the florist kiosk removed entirely.

The square, in name and content, is a testament to the entrepreneurial and industrial spirit of Montreal's Victorian Era anglophone business community.

=== Tribute to Sir Wilfrid Laurier ===
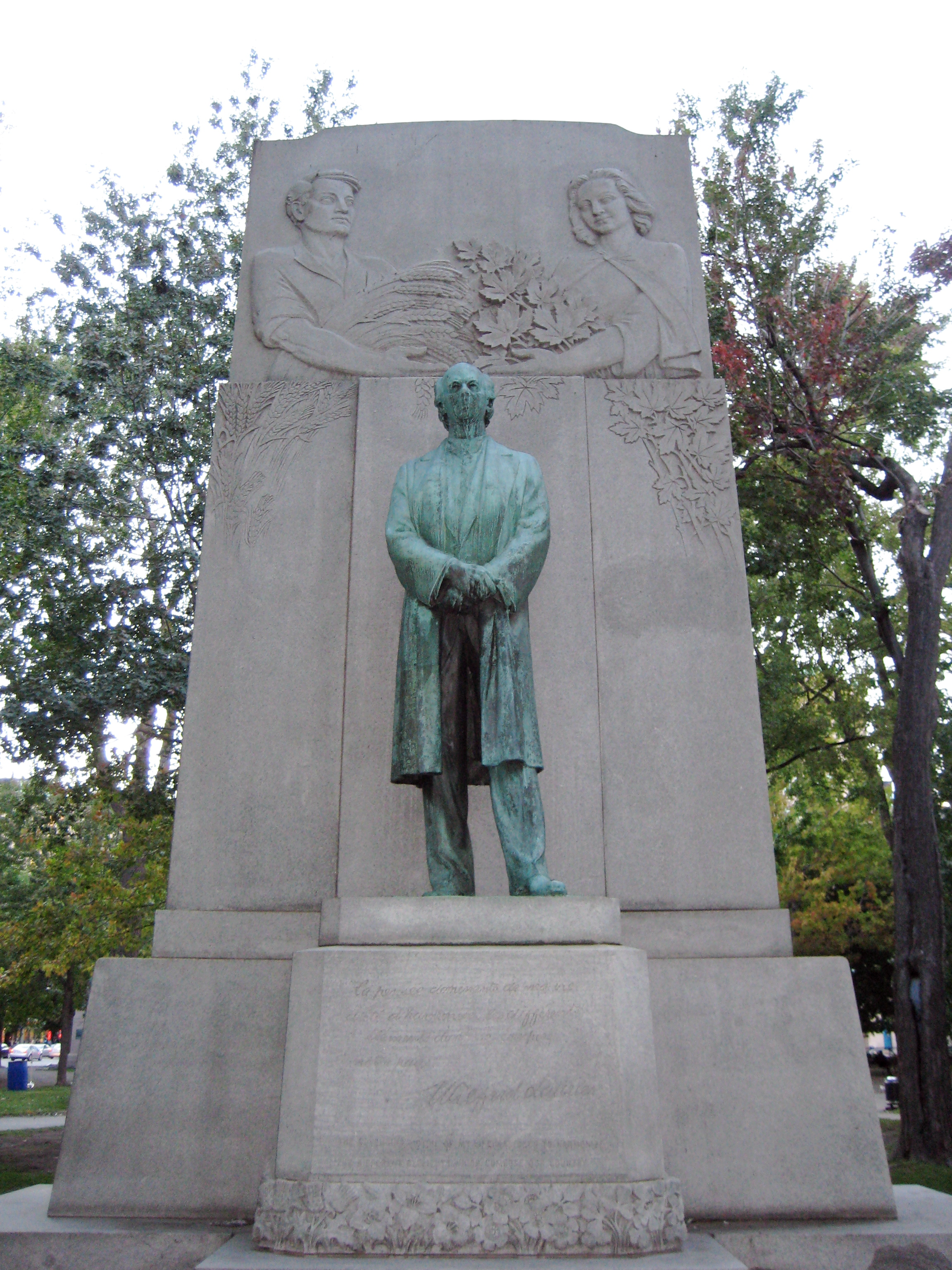
Tribute to Sir Wilfrid Laurier, 1953, Joseph-Émile Brunet

Beginning from the southern side of the square, the first monument is the tribute to Wilfrid Laurier, constructed in 1953 by Joseph-Émile Brunet. Laurier faces south across René Lévesque Boulevard towards the United States. Laurier was a proponent of an early free-trade agreement with the United States and wanted to develop a more continental economic orientation. Also, as Canada's first French-Canadian prime minister, he faces off against the tribute to John A. Macdonald, across the street in what is now Place du Canada. Macdonald is enshrined in a stone baldachin emblazoned with copper reliefs of the various agricultural and industrial trades. Laurier stands with the shelter of the massive trees which characterize the square, a granite relief of the provinces created and united under his administrations opposite a bas-relief of man and woman sharing the harvest. Laurier also stands with his back facing the back of the Boer War Memorial—Laurier had been against the war.

=== Boer War Memorial ===
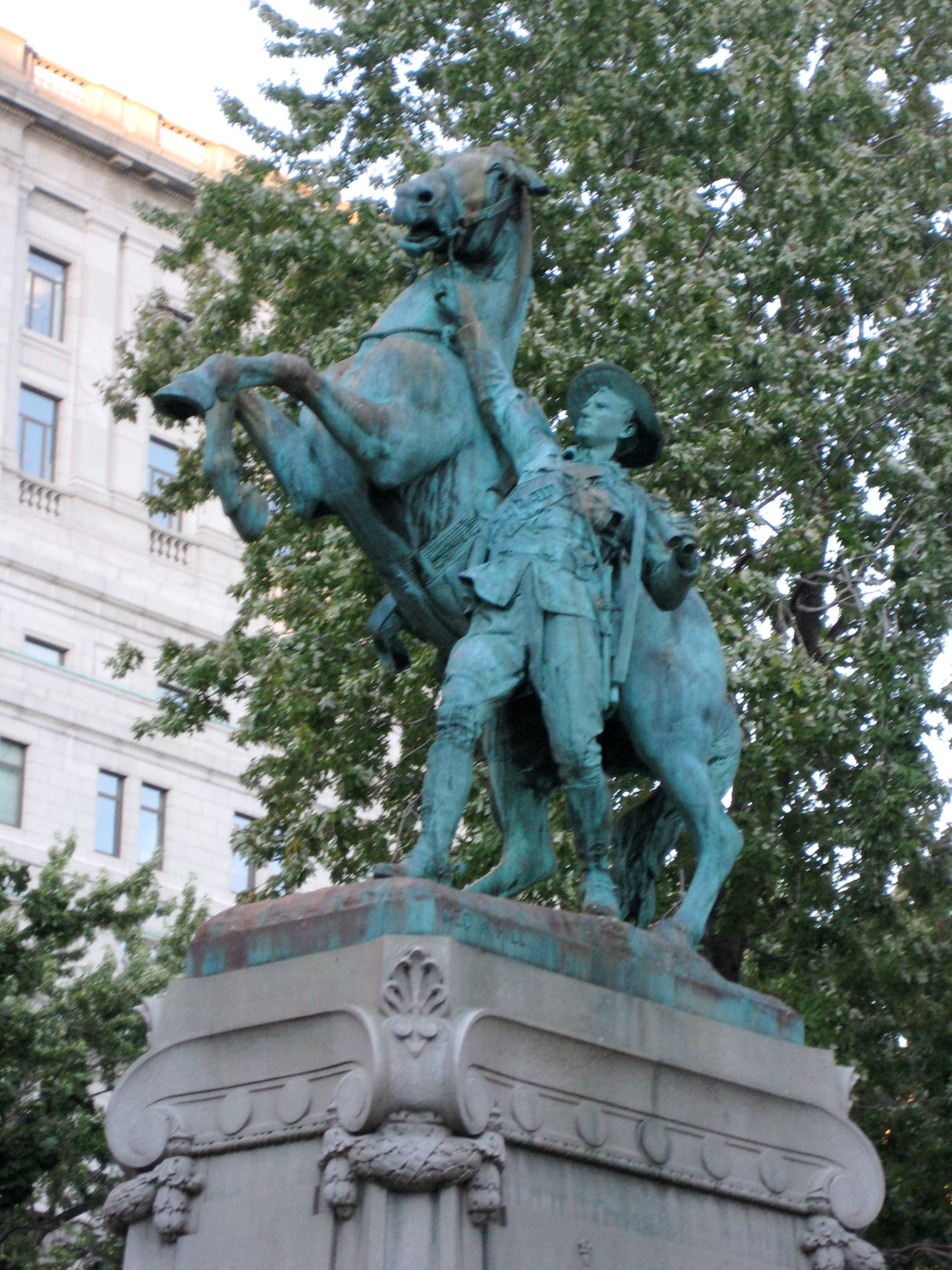
Close-up of the only equestrian statue in the City of Montreal

The Boer War Memorial faces north, towards the cross atop Mount Royal, which would have been visible from the square up until 1929. It is the only equestrian statue in Montreal, and atypically, is not mounted, but restrained. The Boer War was widely unpopular in Quebec society, viewed as an imperial war. Prime Minister Laurier opposed the war, but ultimately compromised with the proposal for militia and volunteers en lieu of conscription. The war was disastrous for most of its first half, and the losses significant enough to anticipate the losses of middle and upper-class men during the First World War. Around the base of the statue, there are copper reliefs and the names of each battle. The memorial is in the centre of the square and forms the central point in the cross arrangement of the monuments.

=== Robert Burns statue ===
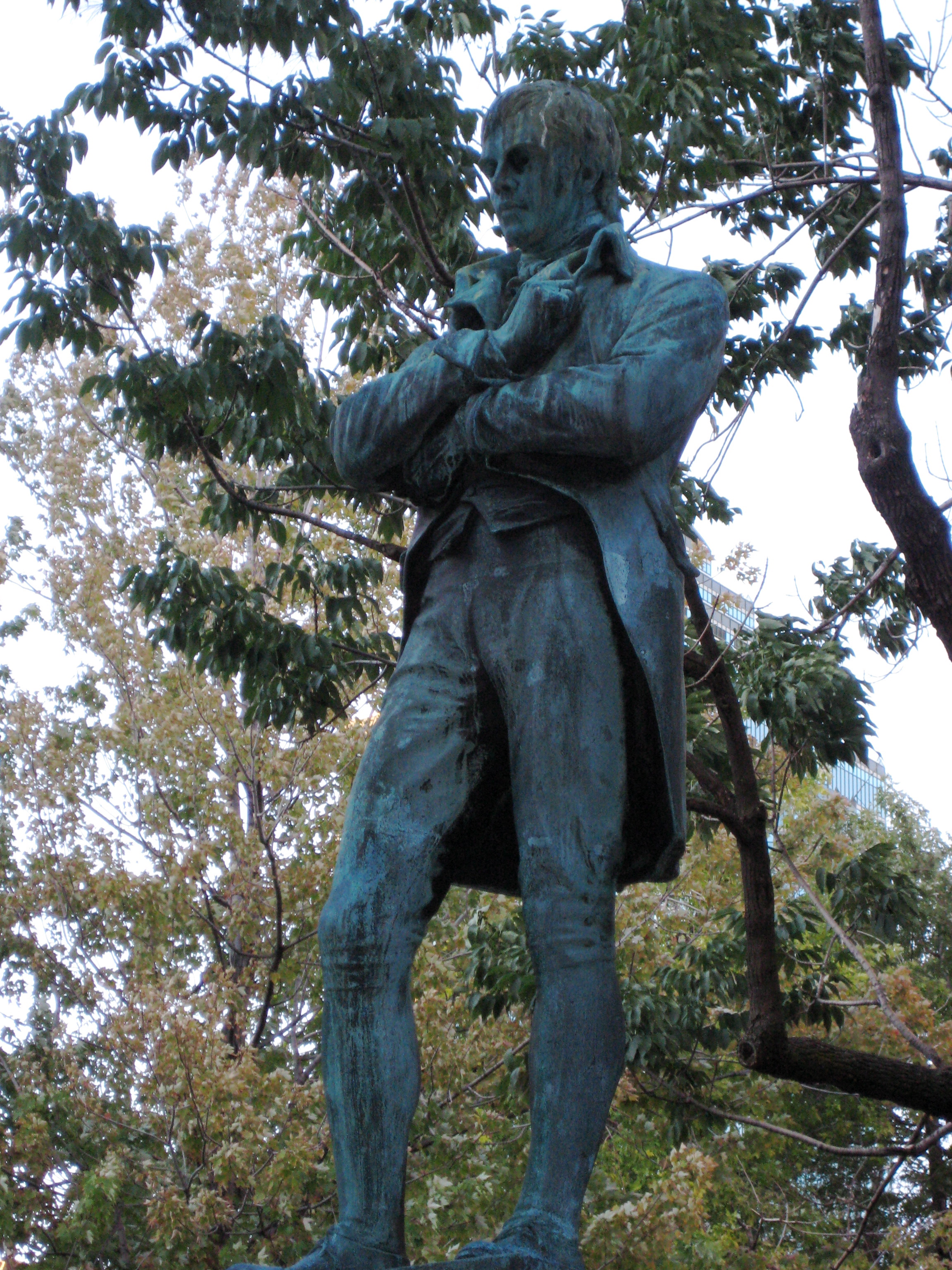
Close-up of the Robert Burns statue, dedicated to the Scottish poet

The Robert Burns Statue forms the western point in the cross and is placed at the western entrance to the square. Facing west, Burns is a tribute to the industrialists and financiers of Montreal's Scottish community. Burns represents the socially conscious and refined romantic ideal of the community during the High Victorian Era. Additionally, Burns looks out towards the infinite expanse of Western Canada, opened up by the rail and finance managed by the elites of the community.

== Function within the urban environment ==
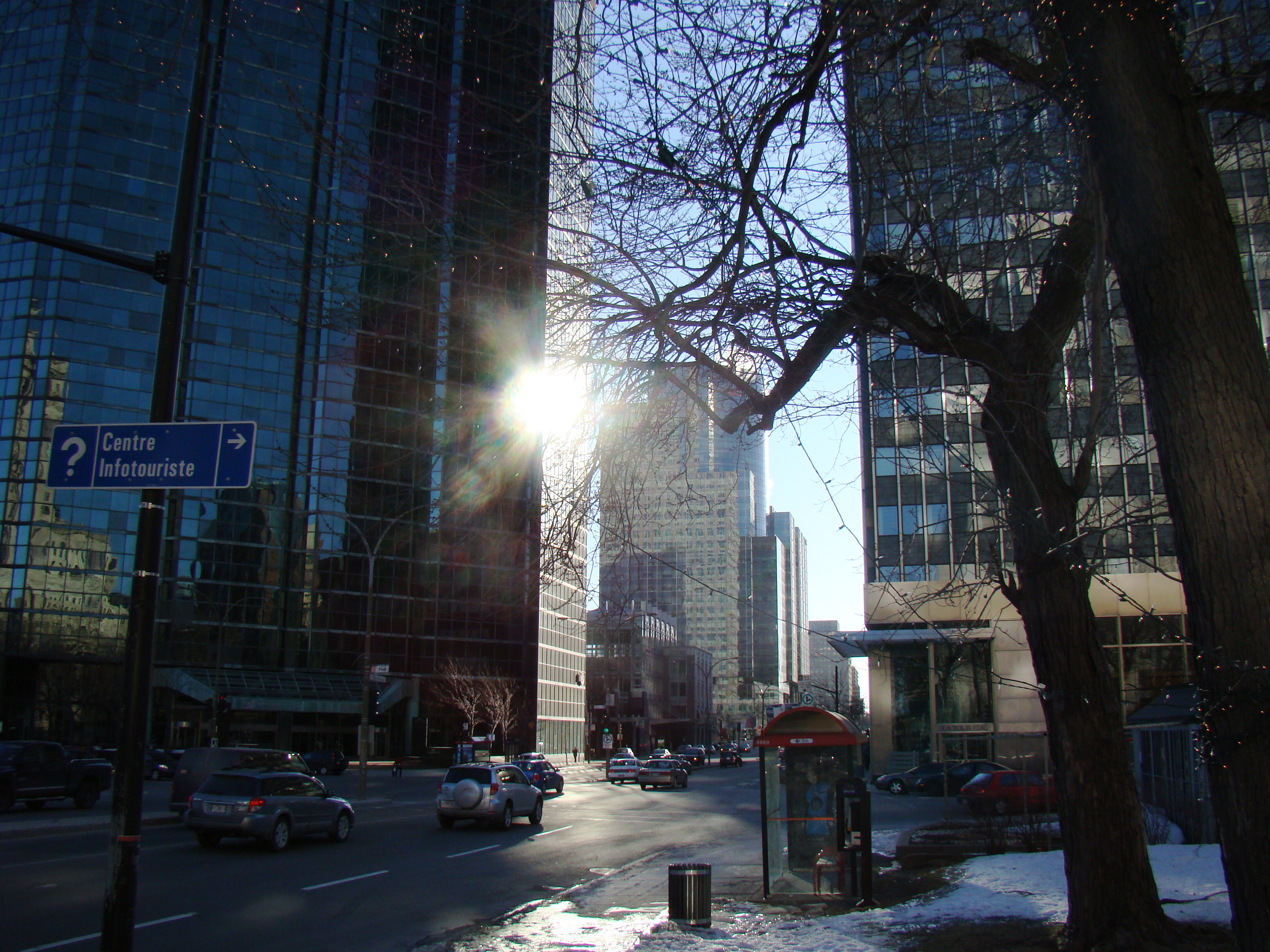
Intersection of Peel Street and René Lévesque Boulevard from the southern side of the square, looking at sunset through the Peel cluster of skyscrapers. Most prominent here is the former Lavalin Building

Dorchester Square and Place du Canada share a variety of functions within the urban environment of downtown Montreal. In fact, the variety of functions performed and their inter-relations is what necessitates careful consideration of the square and which prohibits reckless redevelopment and strict regulation regarding new development.

=== Traffic diffusion and intermodal transit ===
Functionally speaking, Dorchester Square and Place du Canada are traffic diffusers, diffusing not only traffic within a mode, but creating an 'environmental lobby' from which traffic may change modes in addition to orientation. With this in mind, consider that the area is accessed by the city's two principal train stations, (Windsor Station and Central Station), as well as by four metro stations and is accessed by the three densest portions of Underground City. In addition, the area is adjacent to both the Ville-Marie Expressway and the Bonaventure Expressway, which allows a diffusion of automobile traffic in multiple routes towards the square and plaza.

The second element of this traffic-diffusion component is the ability to easily and effectively transfer between transit nodes. The high concentration of automobile parking spaces in the downtown core is focused on the square (which has a parking garage under it, accessed by Peel, Metcalfe and Dominion Square streets) and provides immediate access—via the square and plaza—to the variety of public transit modes arranged around the area. To the east is the Place Ville Marie corridor of the Underground City, which carries pedestrian traffic from the Roddick Gates at McGill University on Sherbrooke Street all the way south to Place Bonaventure. At Place Bonaventure, pedestrian traffic is diverted both further east, to Square Victoria, the Quartier international de Montréal, Tour de la Bourse, Old Montreal, Place d'Armes and the Palais des congrès de Montréal. Traffic diffused through this corridor to the west can be connected to the Terminus Centre-Ville at 1000 de la Gauchetière or further along to the Château Champlain, the Place du Canada Building, Windsor Station, 1250 René-Lévesque, Bell Centre and Lucien-L'Allier.

=== Interconnection with the Underground City ===
Pedestrian traffic diffused from this corridor to the north and northwest can bring pedestrian as far as Drummond and Sherbrooke at rush-hours, but mostly serves the interconnected malls and department stores near McGill College Avenue, such as the Centre Eaton, Place Montreal Trust, 1501 McGill College, Les Cours Mont-Royal, Place de la Cathédrale, Complexe Les Ailes (Montreal), and several other connected shopping malls. As such, via the north of the square, both Peel and McGill metro stations are accessible to the square.

The function of the square and plaza as environmental and inter-modal lobby is enhanced by what is not connected to the Underground City and the various modes of transit which circle the square. The Sun Life Building's principal vault lies below street level at the very centre of the building's foundation, therefore requiring underground traffic pass around the square or come outside to cross it. The same situation is repeated by the cluster of skyscrapers and prominent buildings near the intersection of Peel and René Lévesque Boulevard. The Peel Cluster includes several prominent buildings, including the Tour CIBC, Place Laurentienne, the Windsor Hotel and the Centre Sheraton. In addition, the Dominion Square Building is best accessed via the square and is similarly unconnected.

=== Social traffic ===
The presence of vital, yet unconnected buildings directly on the square induces social traffic through the square and plaza. During good weather, the area is a generator of social inter-traffic. Its presence and position allows for use by every social and cultural group within the city.

The social inter-traffic component is best witnessed in summer months, when all sorts of Montrealers combine with the tourist element. The central Quebec Tourism bureau for Montreal is located at the Dominion Square Building, and the square is specifically designed to handle specialty vehicles such as limousines, sightseeing buses and motor coaches. Throughout the day, tourists and office workers mingle with students and artists. The kiosk located at the northern end of the square, locally referred to as a Camillienne—in reference to Montreal mayor Camillien Houde, who ordered their construction as Depression Era make-work projects—is a snack bar and café open primarily in the summer. Additionally, the northwestern portion of the square, on Peel north of Cypress, is dominated by a variety of restaurants, bars, clubs, bistros and taverns. It should not be surprising that the square and plaza are filled by thousands of people around noontime, enjoying their lunch break in an area where sunshine and shade balance each other quite well. Those sunning themselves on the lawn are usually mere feet away from a patch of cool and humid temperate broadleaf and mixed forest.

The meeting of transit access and the social centrality of the area make it an ideal location for protests to orient. It is large enough to hold a mass of people; the area plays host to nearly all visitors; and it has become the protected courtyard of the city's collection of showcase architecture and addresses. It is the visible section of the urban environment and is used for this purpose by the municipal government's permit department.

Montreal has hosted various protest marches and political rallies since the beginning of the Quiet Revolution, with several notable events involving the square and plaza. Dorchester Square is a frequently used site because its location offers high visibility to office workers at surrounding windows. Additionally, police can observe proceedings from a distance while remaining unobtrusive.

Generally protests, rallies and demonstrations in Montreal are non-violent, small and calm. In the last few years a weekly protest of little more than a dozen people has convened at the southwest corner of Dorchester Square every Friday during the summer months. The noontime demonstration is against a variety of offences committed by the Government of Israel, whose Consulate General is located across the street in the Tour CIBC.

== Unity Rally ==
Perhaps the most famous demonstration to take place in this area was the Unity Rally of October 27, 1995. Three days before the 1995 Quebec referendum, Canadians from outside Montreal descended into Dorchester Square and Place du Canada and joined a massive demonstration in support of the federalist campaign against Quebec sovereignty. Crowd estimates varied widely, from 35,000 to 150,000. The event was a massive project which involved Prime Minister Jean Chrétien, Progressive Conservative leader (and future Quebec premier) Jean Charest, Quebec Premier Daniel Johnson Jr. and a host of provincial premiers and federal cabinet ministers. Quebec sovereigntist elements were present in comparatively microscopic numbers and had managed to post a few signs, including a banner pulled by a small airplane reading "Welcome to Our New Economic Partners!" Despite this, the event passed without major incident, as Montreal Police were quick to enforce the rules and parameters of the protest and remove agitators from both sides quickly and quietly. As such, clashes of ideas remained at the level of passionate debate.

== Current renovation plan ==
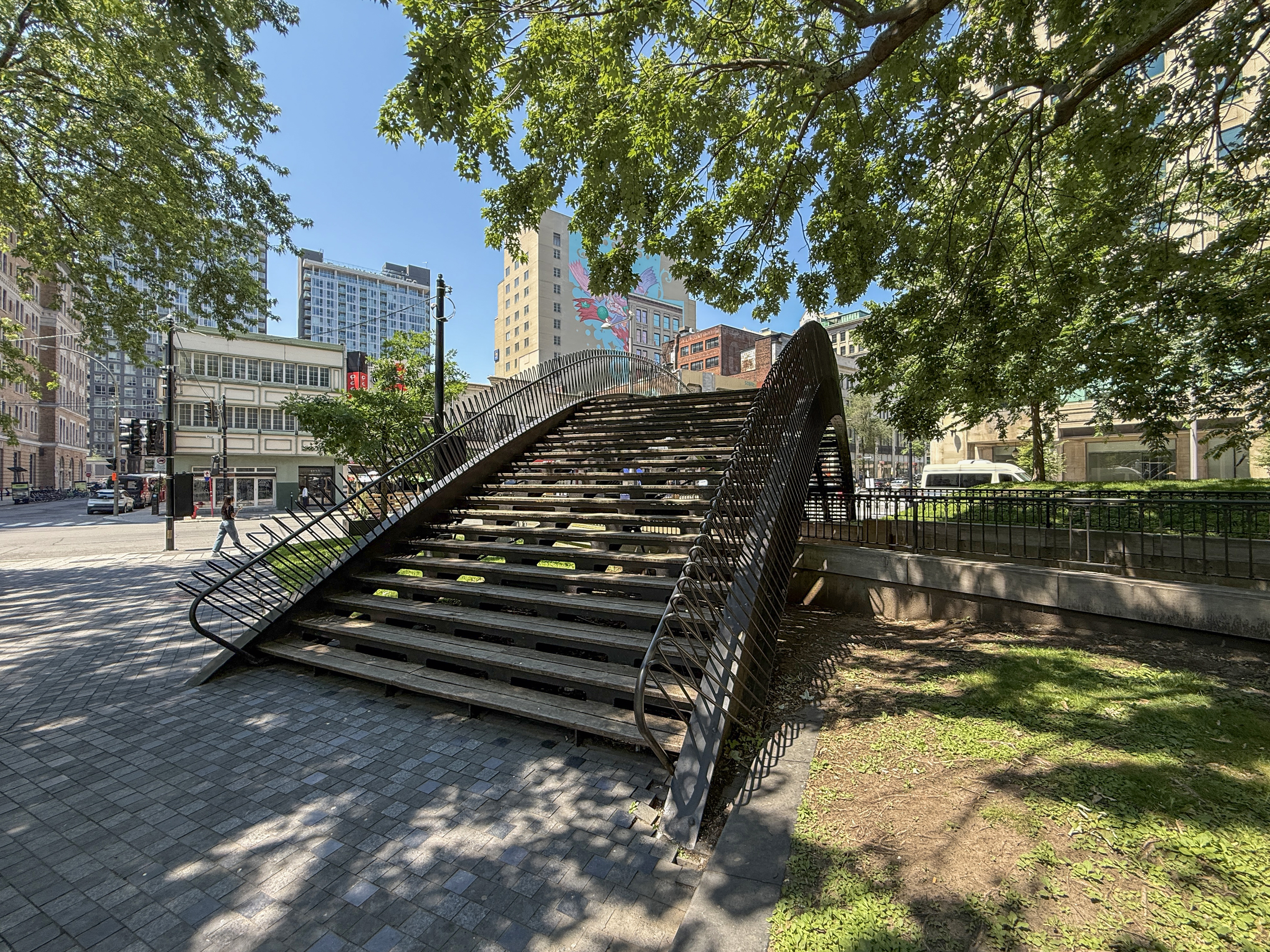
New bridge added during the renovation plan

Montreal landscape architect Claude Cormier has been chosen to lead a renovation of $3.5 million over four years (2009–2012) to breathe some new life into the square and plaza. The area will not see any dramatic alterations to its character or composition, but rather will receive a landscaping "facelift" and a $750,000 lighting system to illuminate the many statues and monuments present.

== Image gallery ==
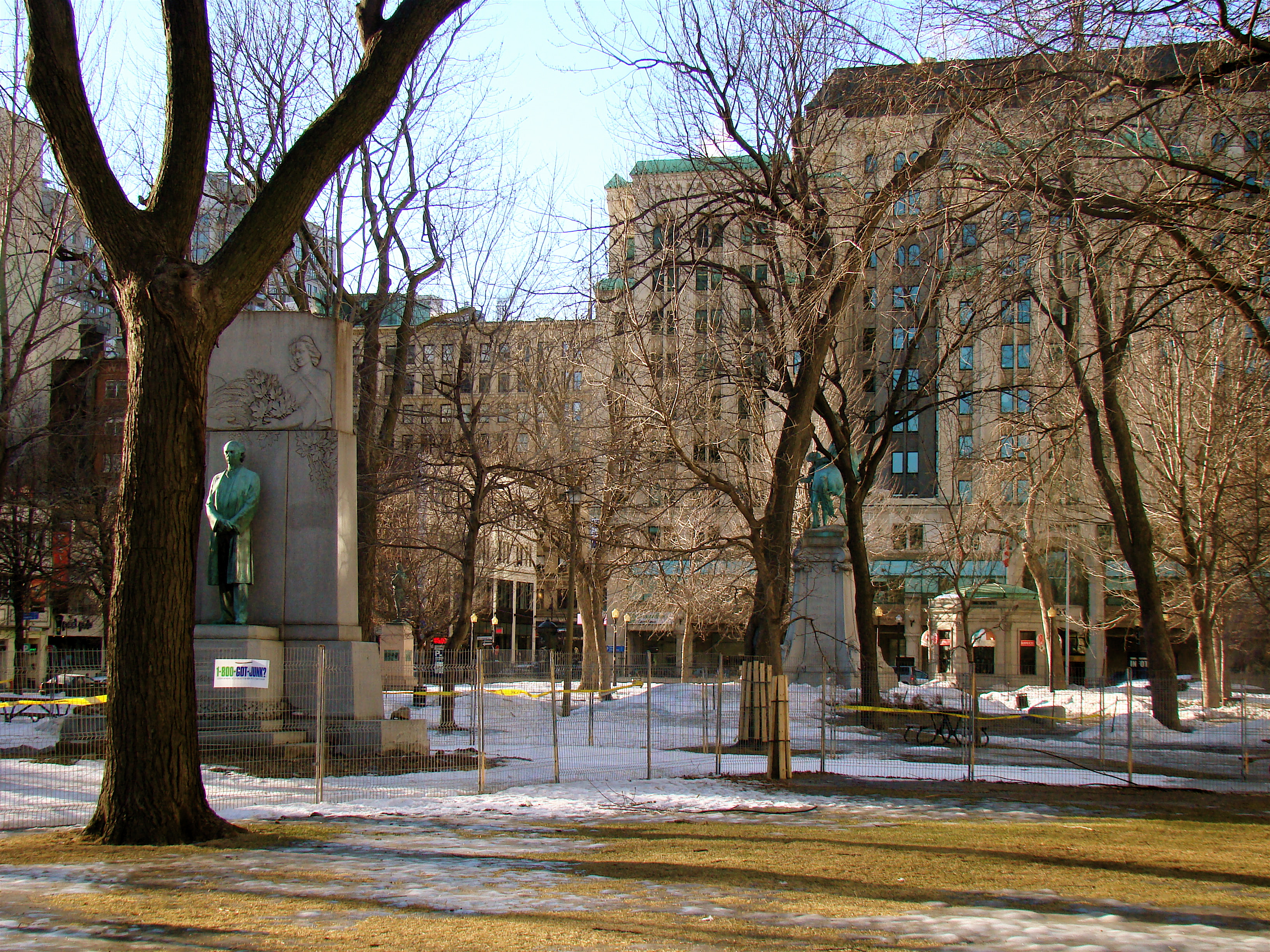
Interior of the square, with two monuments visible, Tribute to Laurier in foreground and Boer War Memorial behind with Dominion Square Building in background

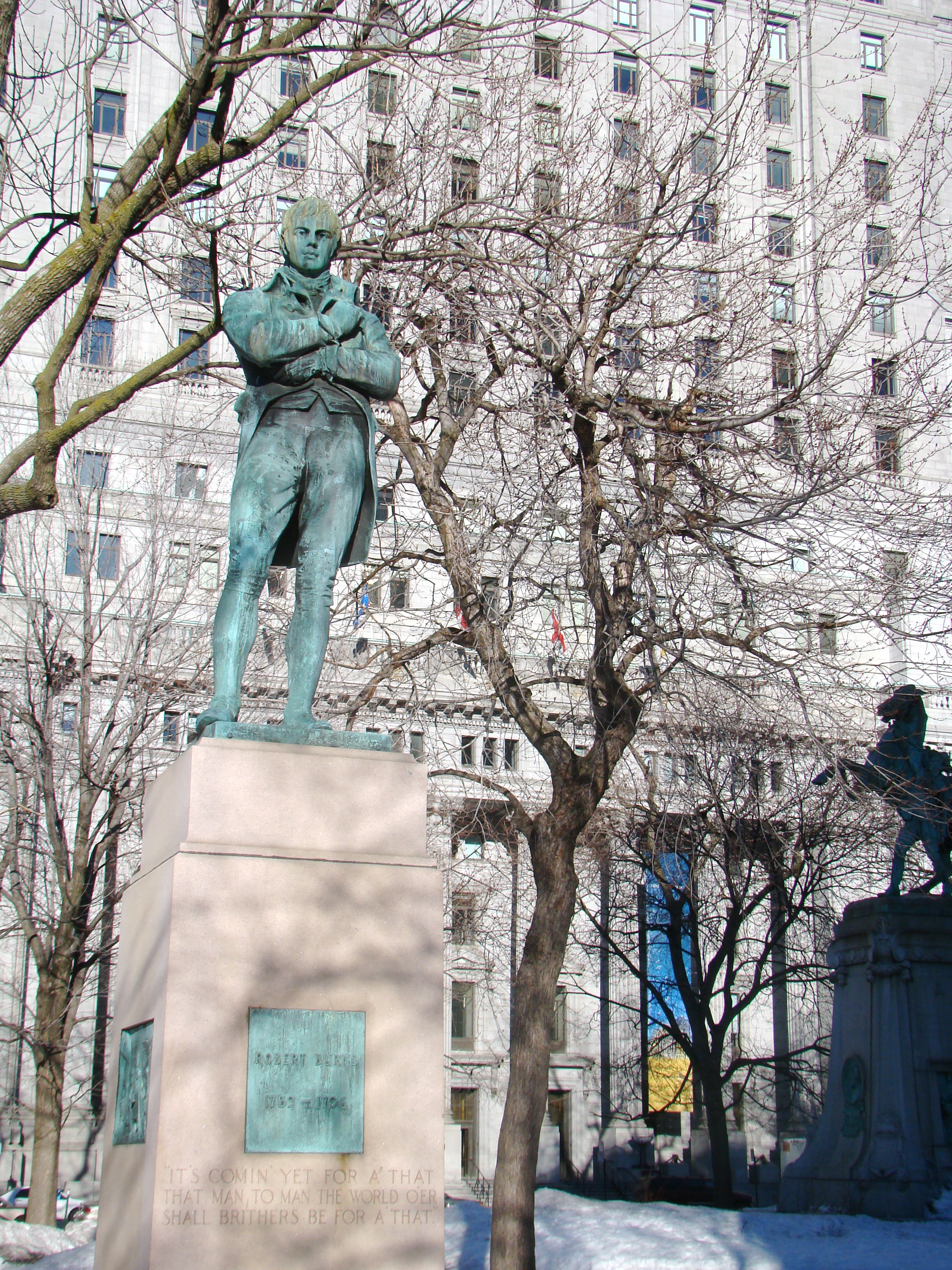
View from western side of the square. Tribute to Robert Burns in the foreground, Boer War Memorial in behind and the Sun Life Building in the background

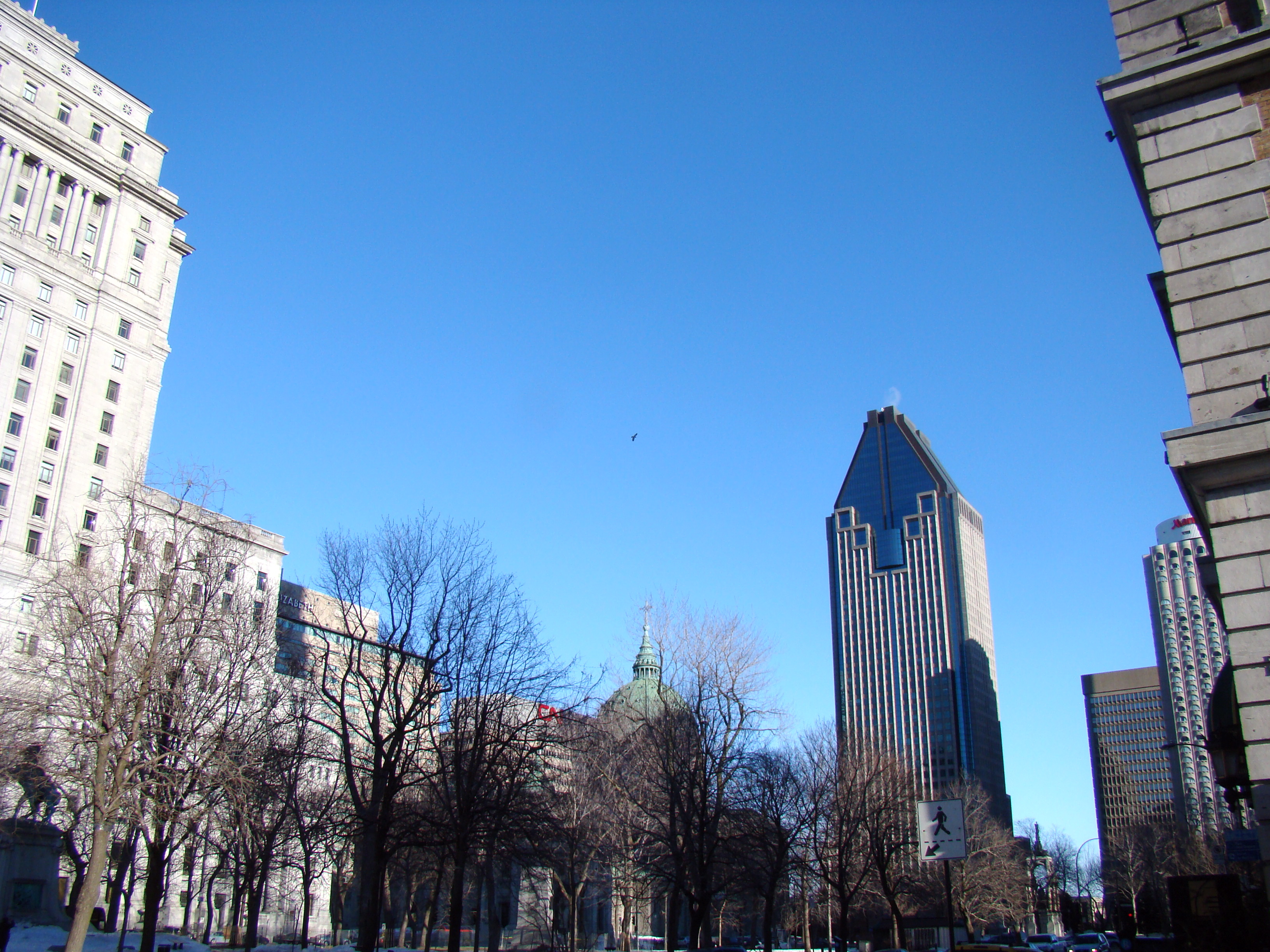
Skyscrapers gathered around Dorchester Square, looking southeast

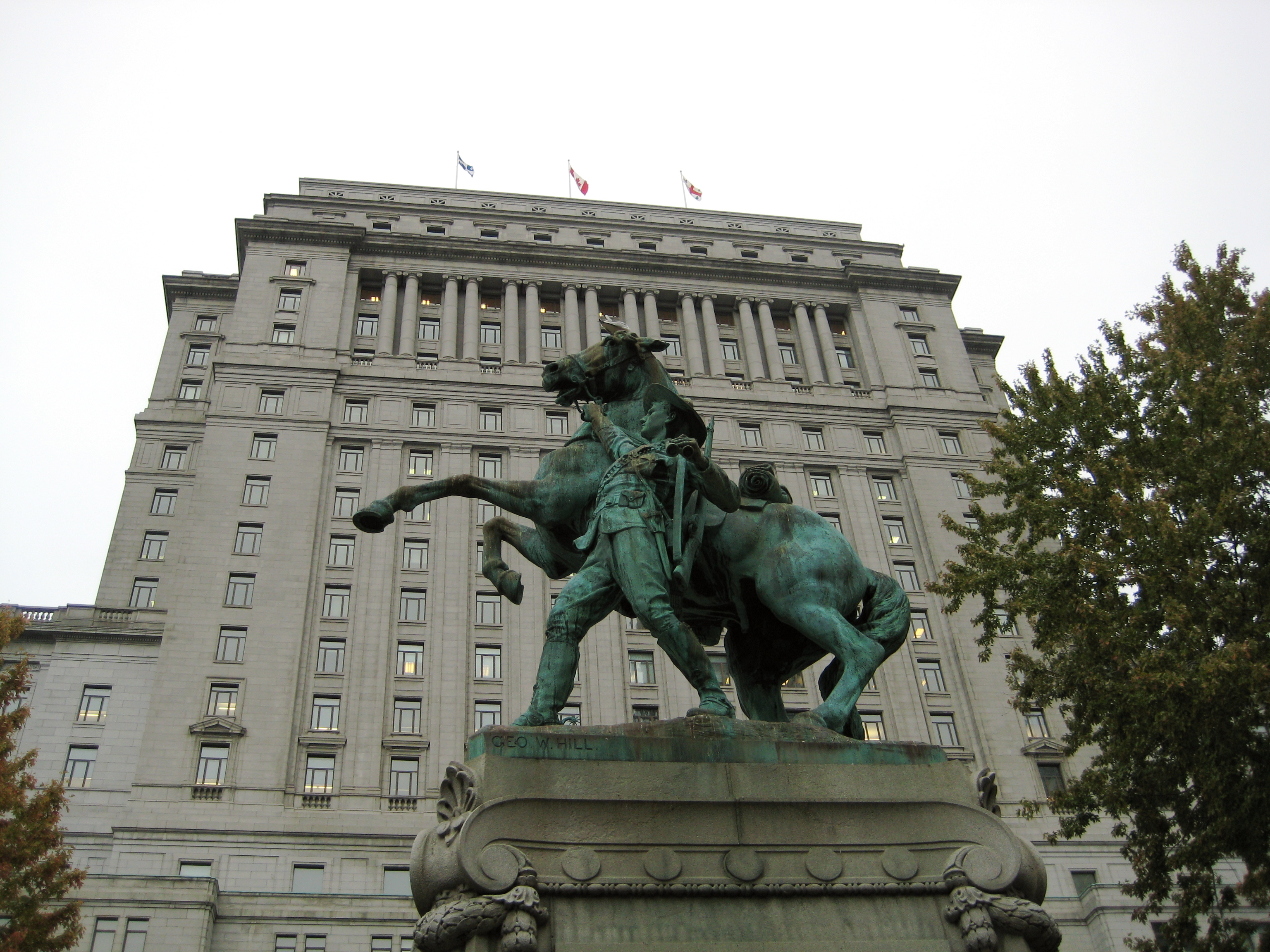
Boer War Memorial with Sun Life Building in background

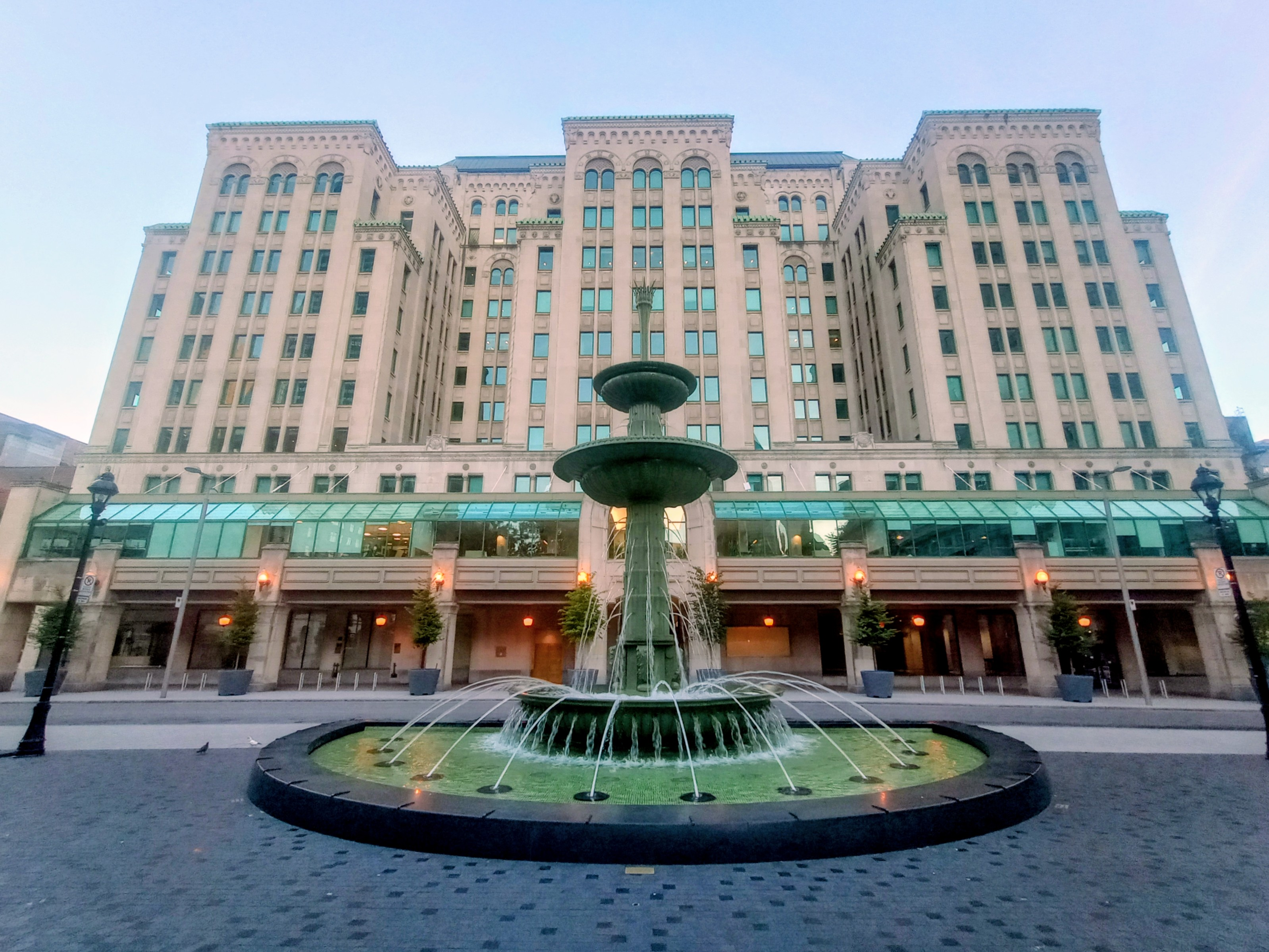
Dominion Square Building on the North side of Dorchester Square

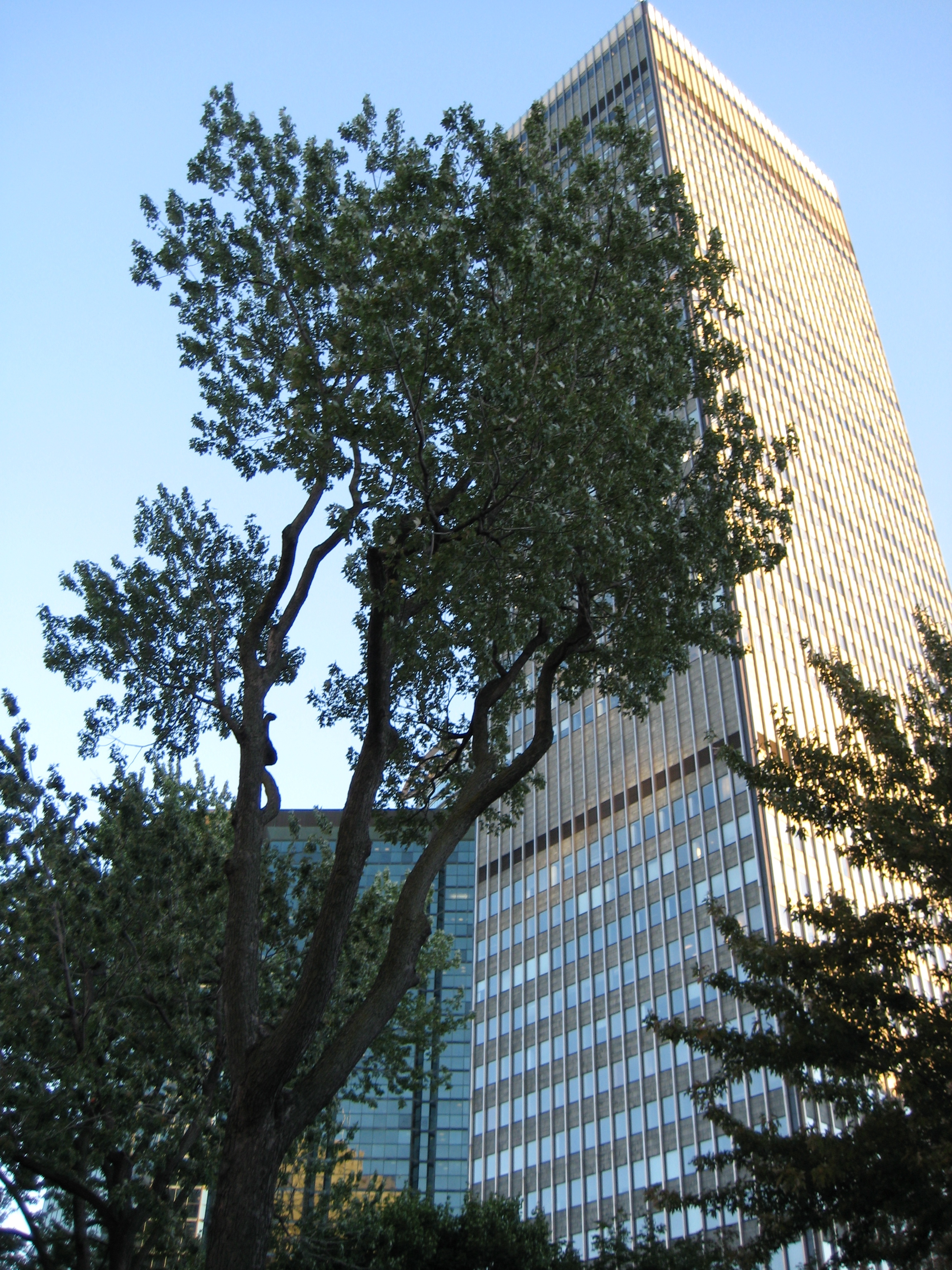
Tour CIBC and Aeroports de Montréal Buildings from centre of Dorchester Square

View from the roof of the Windsor Station, showing from left to right, St. George's Cathedral, the Windsor Hotel, Erskine Church, YMCA and the Knox Church

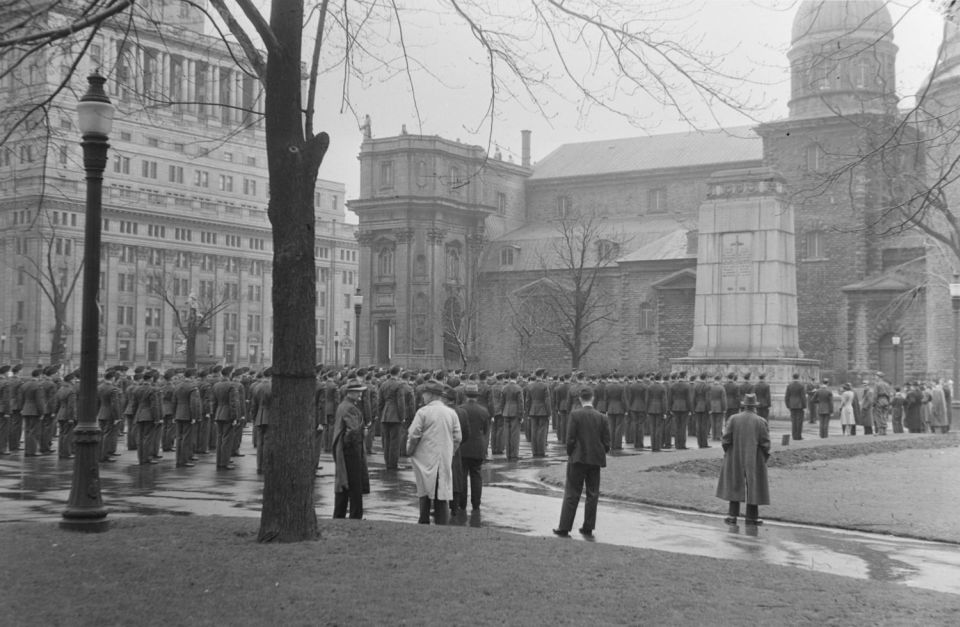
ANZAC Day in 1941
