= Dominion Square Building =

Dominion Square Building French: Édifice Dominion Square
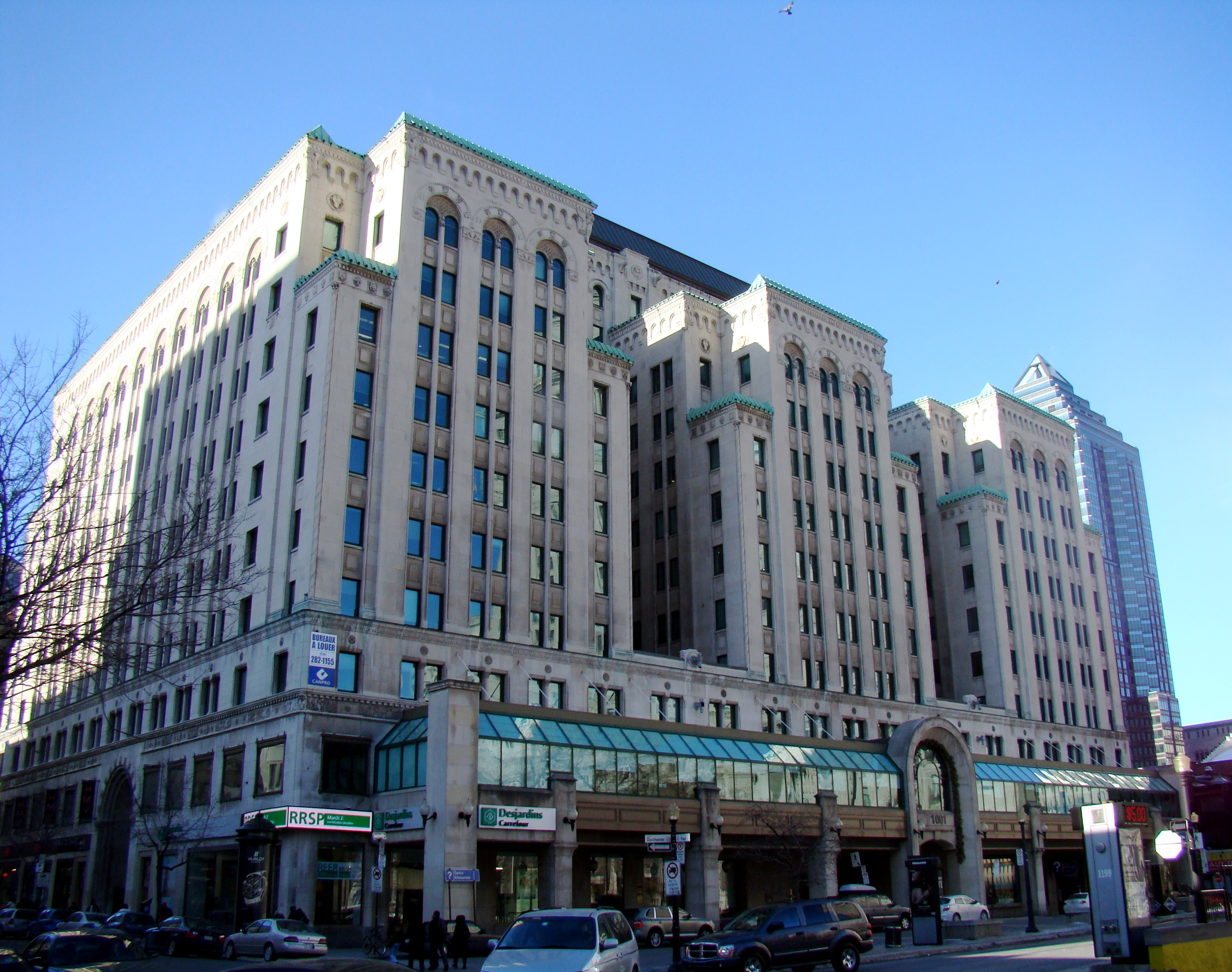
- Dominion Square Building from Cypress and Peel Streets
- Interactive map of the Dominion Square Building; French: Édifice Dominion Square area

General information
- Status: Completed
- Type: Municipal
- Location: Montreal
- Coordinates: 45°30′01.75″N 73°34′20.54″W
- Opened: 1929
- Management: Canpro Investments

The Dominion Square Building (French: Édifice Dominion Square) is a landmark office building in Downtown Montreal facing Dorchester Square on its northern side. It is located at 1010 Sainte-Catherine Street West, in Montreal, Quebec, Canada.

The building is named after the old name of the Square and its southern access is provided by Dorchester Square Street, which connects Peel Street to Metcalfe Street and offers access to a 600-lot parking garage under the building. The building was acquired for $78.25 million in 2005 by David Azrieli of Azrieli Holdings Inc.

== Architecture ==
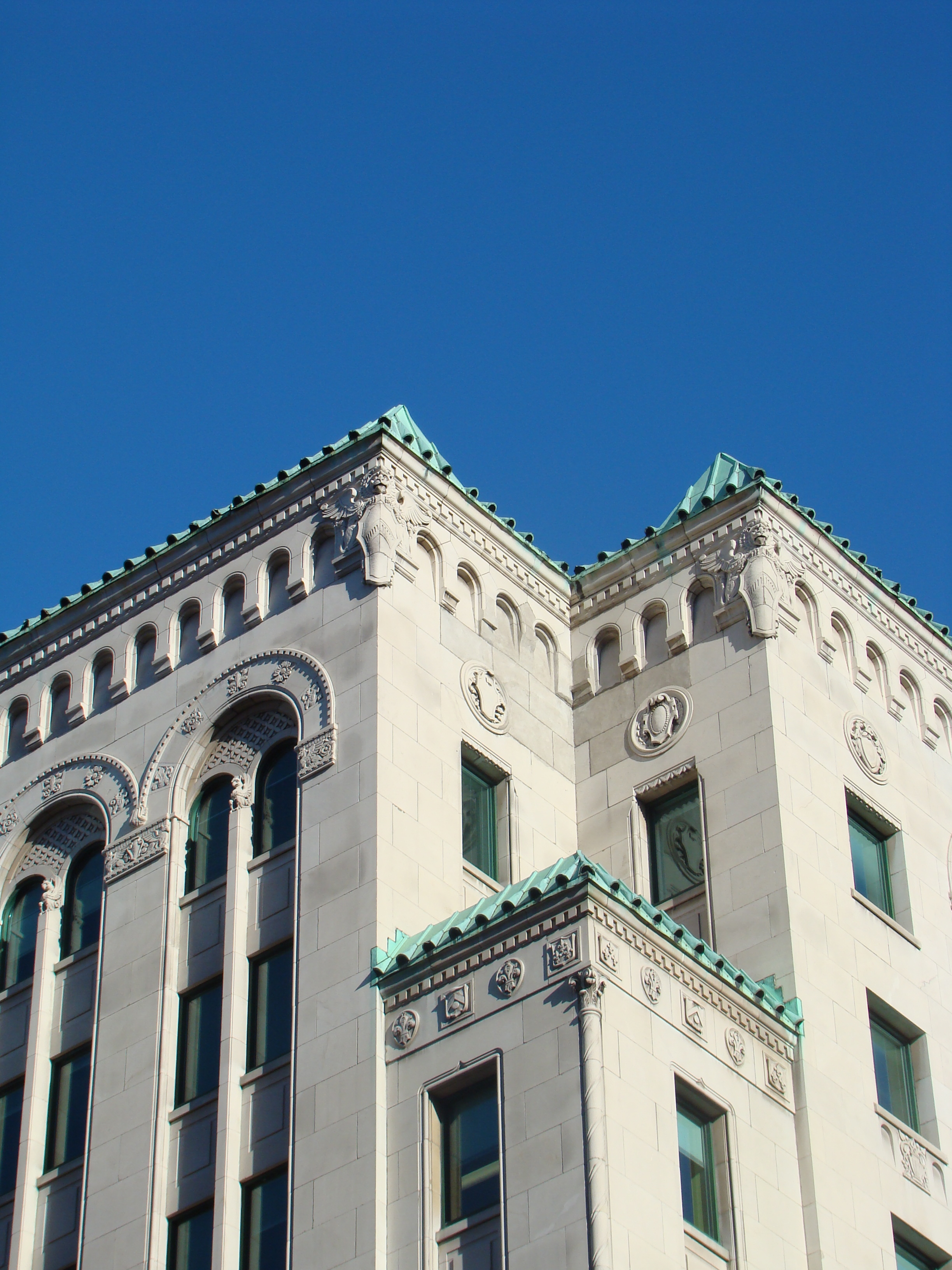
A detail of the Italianate style

Completed between 1928 and 1930 in the Beaux Arts style, the Dominion Square Building is both a commercial office tower and a shopping mall. The site was formerly occupied by the Erskine Presbyterian Church c. 1866.

Designed by the architectural firm of Ross and Macdonald, the building comprises twelve floors above ground and a T-shaped shopping concourse. The main entrance serves the office tower with escalators leading to a mezzanine looking out onto the ground floor below. The main floor was conceived as an interior shopping arcade at a time when such a notion was highly experimental. Moreover, the original design allowed access to the retail spaces on the ground floor from outside and in. From the third floor up, the facade is twice set back; however, this is not as a result of municipal regulations (only the upper most levels are so regulated), but rather aesthetic choices designed with multiple 'prestige clients' in mind. As such, the twin setbacks form a double comb shape which provides ample sunlight throughout the building while further permitting natural light to pass through the setbacks onto Sainte-Catherine Street below. By doing so, the building maximizes the total amount of available rental space for comparatively small city block. Moreover, multiple offices within have several different views, and recessed corners provide additional corner offices on the 9th and 10th floors.

The façade is of Alabama Rockwood limestone and is described as having an unconventional, yet plentiful Italianate decor.

During the last major set of renovations, undertaken in 1989, a second and third floor extension was made, jutting out as a protective arcade with green-glass solarium on top, along the southern side of the building.

== Current tenants and services ==
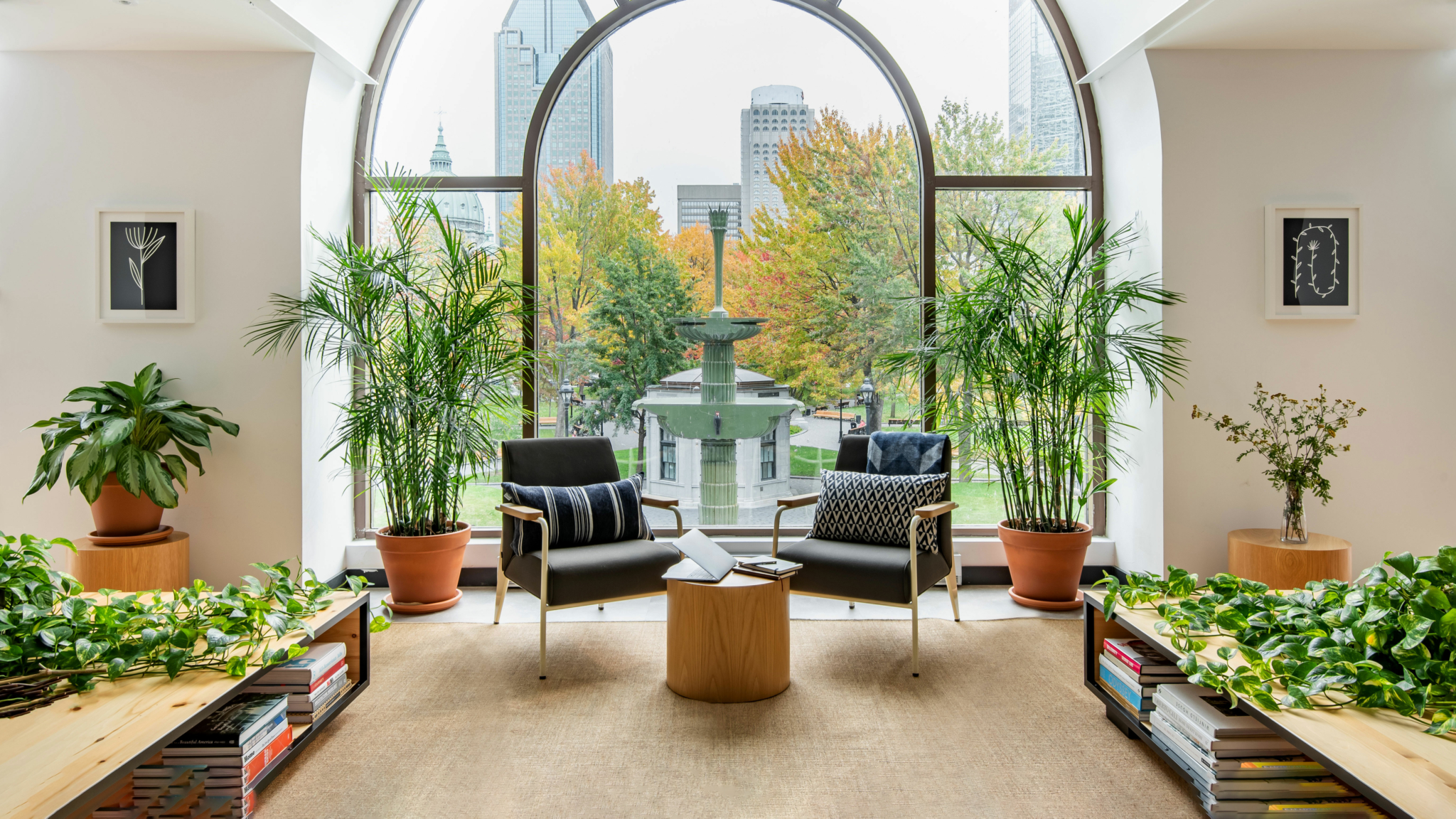
View from inside WeWork's 2nd floor looking towards Dorchester Square

Current principal tenants include a women's wear retailer along Metcalfe Street. Global Television Network moved their CKMI-DT station onto the 7th floor. The broadcast station includes a virtual television studio whereby anchors sit in front of a green screen and robotic cameras are controlled from remote cities.

WeWork is a tenant with 3 floors with the main floor being on the 2nd floor.

== Former tenants ==
For decades until 2020, the main Montreal Tourism office occupied the southeast corner of the ground floor (facing Dorchester Square).

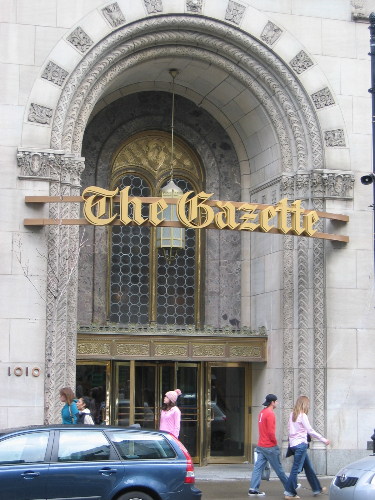
Offices of The Gazette.

Between 2003 and late 2019, the principal tenant was the Montreal Gazette, which had placed a marquee title holder atop the arcaded entrance along Saint Catherine Street.

Sherlock's Pub was once a tenant (Commercial )

== Relation to the urban environment ==
The building was conceived as an ingenious solution to the multitude of building height and size regulations imposed by the City of Montreal during the early part of the 20th century. Moreover, it was conceived as an element of a new urban environment, and thus provided not only two levels of interior shopping and two levels of underground parking, but the city's first escalators as well. It was built at a time when there was significant interest (on the part of builders and promoters) to involve all elements of society, not just those who happened to work there. Furthermore, the available shopping space within was further conceived to be accessible from two sides, permitting the entire building to participate in social traffic exchange. Its modern conveniences and amenities, the prestige of location and effective beauty of the design made it an exceptionally important commercial office tower in the era before Modernist Skyscrapers.
