= Sun Life Building =

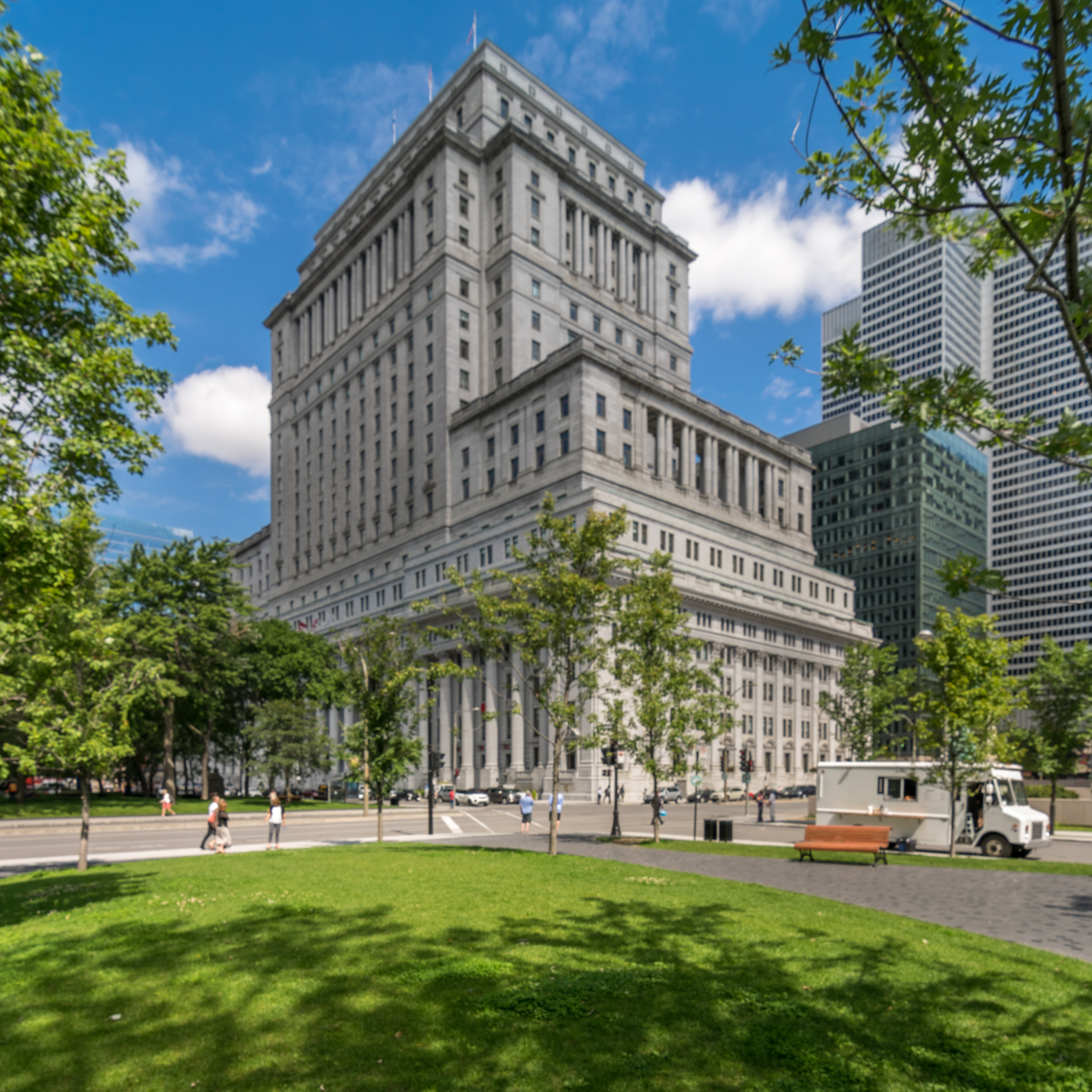
- Interactive map of the Sun Life Building area

General information
- Type: Office
- Architectural style: Neo-classical
- Location: 1155 Metcalfe Street, Montreal, Quebec
- Coordinates: 45°30′0.75″N 73°34′12.81″W
- Construction started: 1913
- Completed: 1931

Height
- Roof: 122 m (400 ft)

Technical details
- Floor count: 24
- Lifts/elevators: 25

Design and construction
- Architects: Darling, Pearson and Cleveland; Le Groupe Arcop

The Sun Life Building is a historic 122-metre (400 ft), 24-story office building at 1155 Metcalfe Street on Dorchester Square in the city's downtown core of Montreal, Quebec, Canada.

The building was completed in 1931 after three stages of construction. It was built exclusively for the Sun Life Assurance Company of Canada. Although the then-new head office of the Royal Bank of Canada at 360 Saint Jacques Street in Montreal was taller by several floors, the Sun Life Building was at the time the largest building in square footage anywhere in the British Empire. The Sun Life Building went through three different stages of construction, the first one starting as early as 1913, but it was not until 1931 that its main 24-storey tower was erected, thus completing the project.

== Construction ==
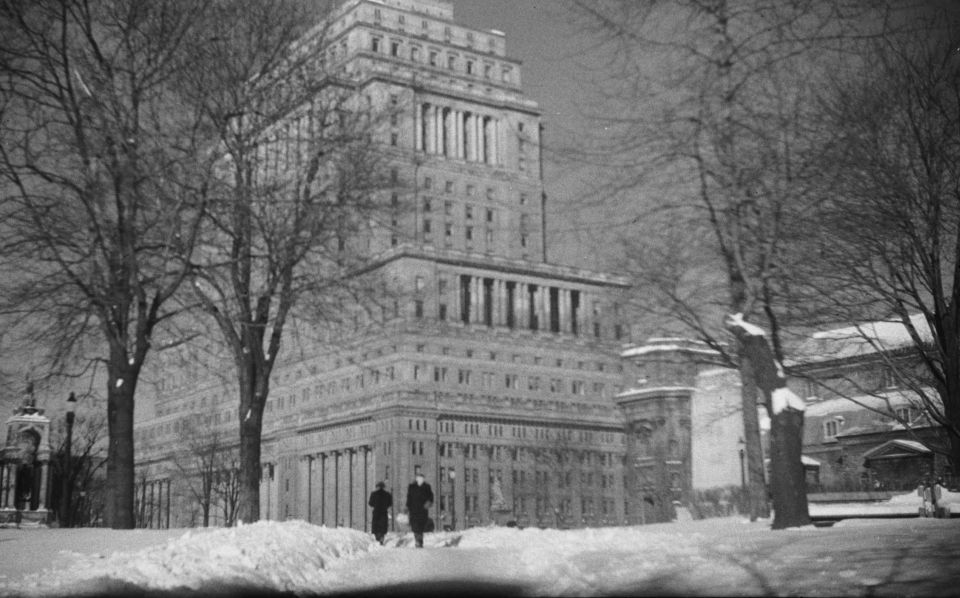
Building in 1948

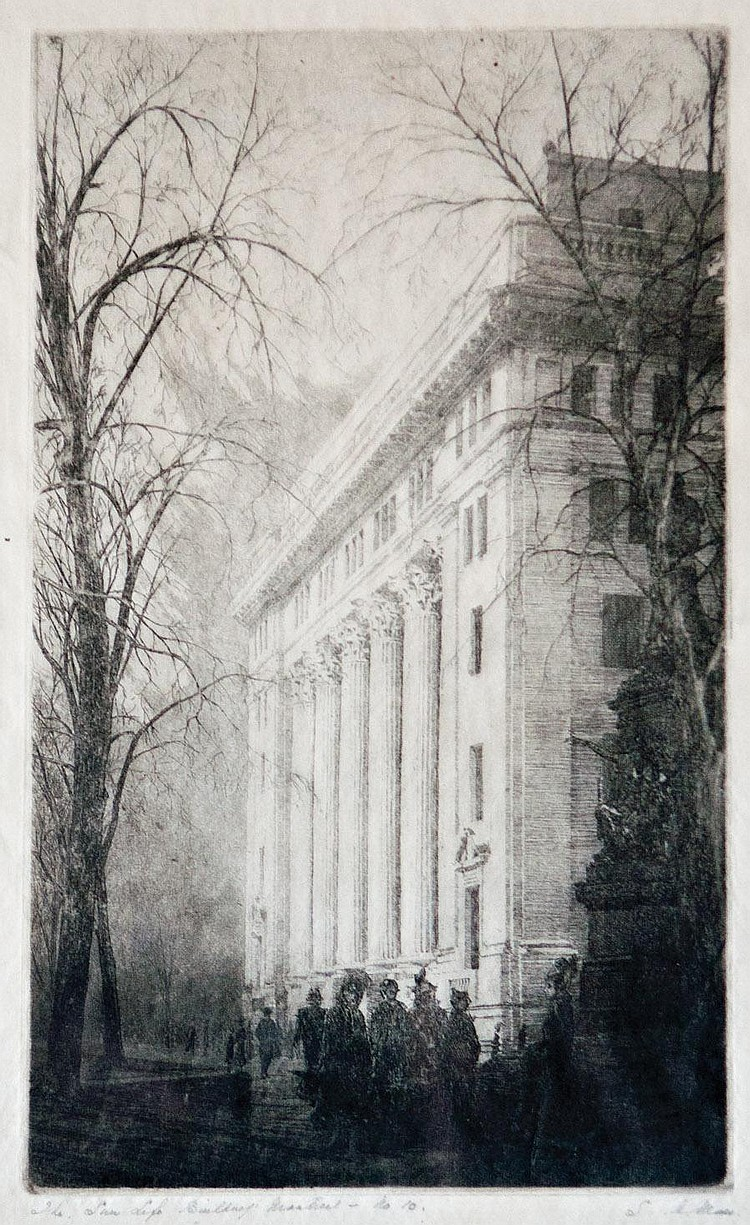
Early etching of the Sun Life by Samuel Herbert Maw

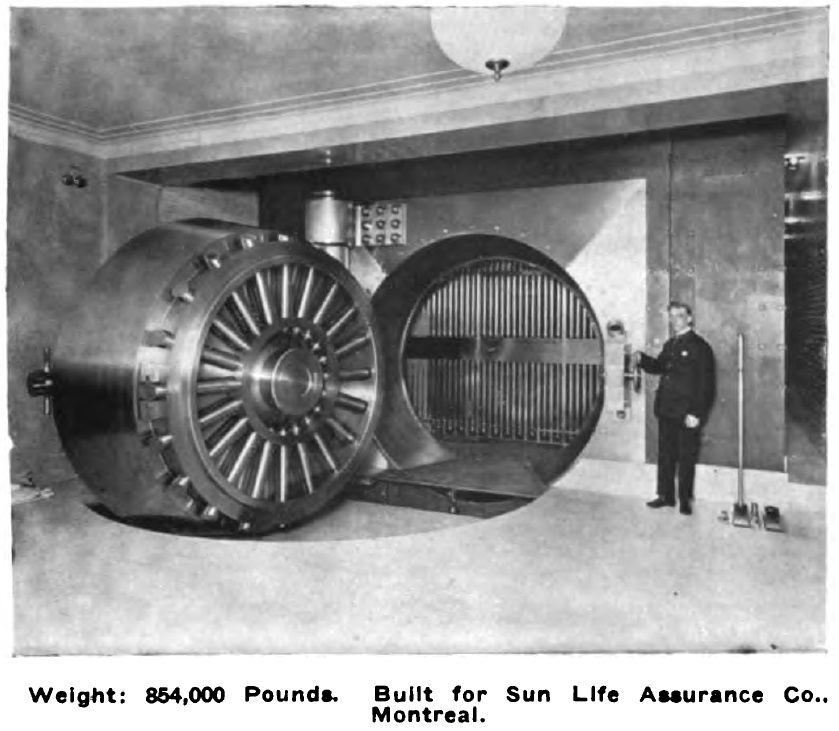
The vault with combination viewer was designed by Frederick S. Holmes and built by York Safe & Lock Co.

The stages of construction were as follows:

- 1913–1918: 7-storey southern part of base;
- 1923–1926: extension of base eastward and northward; and
- 1929–1931: 16-storey set-back tower.

Today, the "Sun Life" is Montreal's 17th tallest building and stands in the middle of the central business district centred on Dorchester Square, dwarfed by neighbouring Place Ville Marie and the nearby CIBC Tower.

== Previous structure ==
The first Sun Life Building, designed by Buffalo architect Richard A. Waite, was built in 1889 and expanded by Robert Findlay in 1890. The red brick building was home to Sun Life until 1913, when the company moved to the first stage of the newer building.

== Operation Fish ==
During the Second World War, during Operation Fish, Britain's gold reserves and negotiable foreign securities were secretly packed in crates labelled 'Fish' and shipped across the Atlantic Ocean to Canada. The securities, arriving at Halifax on July 1, 1940, were locked in an underground vault three storeys beneath the Sun Life Building, guarded around the clock by the Royal Canadian Mounted Police. The gold was shipped on to Ottawa. The extremely secretive United Kingdom Security Deposit, operating in the vault, arranged for the sale of Britain's negotiable securities on the New York Stock Exchange over the next few years to pay for Britain's war expenses. The 5,000 Sun Life employees never knew what was stored away beneath them. None of the cargo went missing and no information about the operation was ever leaked.

== See also ==
- Sun Life Centre
- List of old Canadian buildings (1809–1939)
- List of old Montreal buildings (1829–1939)
