= Metcalfe Street (Montreal) =

Street in Montreal, Canada

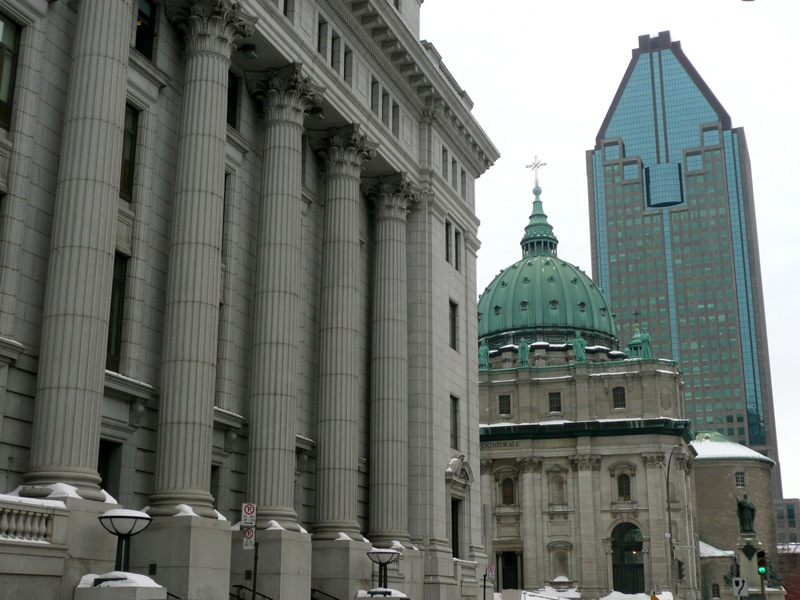
- Metcalfe Street and the Sun Life Building.
- Interactive map of Metcalfe Street
- Native name: rue Metcalfe (French)
- Length: 0.6 km (0.37 mi)
- Location: Between Sherbrooke Street and René Lévesque Boulevard
- Coordinates: 45.501025°N 73.572948°W

Construction
- Inauguration: 1850

Metcalfe Street (officially in French: Rue Metcalfe) is a north–south street located in downtown Montreal, Quebec, Canada. It links Sherbrooke Street in the north and René Lévesque Boulevard in the south. It is best known for being the street on which the Sun Life Building (1155 Metcalfe Street), Mary, Queen of the World Cathedral (formerly known as Saint James Cathedral), and other notable buildings are located. South of René Lévesque Boulevard, the street is known as Cathedral Street (French: rue de la Cathédrale). The street borders the eastern side of both Dorchester Square and Place du Canada, to the south.

== History ==
Opened in the mid 19th century, the street owes its name to Charles Metcalfe, 1st Baron Metcalfe (1785–1846), the 16th Governor General of Canada.
