= Art Souterrain =

Art Souterrain (otherwise known as underground art) is a non-profit organization which exhibits artworks in Montreal's underground city.

== History ==
The organization was founded in Montreal in 2009 by Frederic Loury who is the owner and founder of Galerie [sas]. Art Souterrain took first place in 2009 during the eighth edition of the Nuit Blanche, an activity part of Montreal High Lights Festival. For one night the public was welcomed to walk through Montreal's underground city and see over 80 artists' projects, including video (Video art), Performance art, Photography and Installation art. In the 2010 and 2011 editions, the projects remained the next two weeks after the Nuit Blanche.

In May 2010, Art Souterrain also participated to the Expo 2010 in Shanghai, China. At the expo 15 projects created by artists from Quebec were presented in a shopping center.

In 2010, Art Souterrain was given the award Best Event in Montreal City's Downtown by the Destination Centre-ville organism.

== Description ==
Art Souterrain's journey begins at the Place des Arts, and continues through the Complexe Desjardins, the Complexe Guy-Favreau, Montreal's International District (Quartier international de Montréal)( the Centre CDP Capital, the World Trade Centre Montreal and the Tour de la Bourse (Stock Exchange Tower), the Place de la Cité Internationale, the Place Bonaventure, the Place Ville-Marie, the Eaton Center (Centre Eaton) and the Complexe Les Ailes.

== The artists ==
Notable artists who have participated:

=== 2010 edition ===
Patrick Bérubé, Carole Baillargeon, Peter Gnass, Michael A. Robinson, Dominique Blain, Isabelle Hayeur, John Oswald, Damian Siqueiros (Public's Choice Award 2010), François Morelli, Yannick Guéguen, Jean-François Laporte, Mathieu Beauséjour, Isabelle Choinière, Manon de Pauw, Alana Riley.

=== 2009 edition ===
BGL, Valérie Blass, Gwenaël Bélanger, Carlito Dalceggio, Cooke-Sasseville, Jérôme Fortin, Marc Séguin, Pascal Grandmaison.
