= List of shopping centres in Greater Montreal =

The following is a list of notable shopping centres in Greater Montreal.

== Couronne Nord ==
- Boisbriand
  - Faubourg Boisbriand
- Deux-Montagnes / Sainte-Marthe-sur-le-Lac
  - Centre commercial Les Promenades Deux-Montagnes
- Repentigny
  - Les Galeries Rive-Nord
- Rosemère
  - Centre commercial Les Galeries Mille-Îles
  - Place Rosemère
- Saint-Eustache
  - Carrefour Saint-Eustache
- Saint-Jérôme
  - Carrefour du Nord
- Sainte-Thérèse
  - Centre commercial Plaza Ste-Thérèse
- Terrebonne
  - Les Galeries de Terrebonne

== Couronne Sud ==
- Beloeil
  - Mail Montenach
- Châteauguay
  - Centre régional Châteauguay
- Varennes
  - Galeries Varennes

== Island of Montreal – City of Montreal ==
- Ahuntsic-Cartierville
  - Les Galeries Normandie
  - Marché Central (Mega Mall)
  - Place Fleury
- Anjou
  - Centre commercial Joseph-Renaud
  - Les Galeries d'Anjou
  - Les Halles D'Anjou
- Côte-des-Neiges–Notre-Dame-de-Grâce
  - Centre commercial Van Horne
  - Centre commercial Wilderton
  - Plaza Côte-des-Neiges
- Lachine
  - Les Galeries Lachine
- LaSalle
  - Carrefour Angrignon
  - Place LaSalle
  - Place Newman
- Mercier–Hochelaga-Maisonneuve
  - Centre Champlain (Village Champlain) Honoré-Beaugrand (Montreal Metro)#Nearby points of interest
  - Centre commercial Domaine
  - Place Versailles
  - Promenade Ontario
- Montréal-Nord
  - Centre Commercial Forest
  - Centre Montréal-Nord
  - Place Bourassa
- Rivière-des-Prairies–Pointe-aux-Trembles
  - Carrefour de la Pointe (English: Crossroads of the Point)
  - Faubourg des Prairies
  - Place Pointe-aux-Trembles
- Rosemont–La Petite-Patrie
  - Centre commercial Maisonneuve
  - Plaza Saint-Hubert
- Saint-Laurent
  - Centre commercial Village Montpellier
  - Les Galeries Saint-Laurent
  - Méga Centre Côte-Vertu
  - Norgate Shopping Centre (first shopping mall built in Canada, a strip mall)
  - Place Vertu
- Saint-Leonard
  - Le Boulevard Shopping Centre (partly in Villeray–Saint-Michel–Parc-Extension)
  - Carrefour Langelier
  - Place Michelet
  - Place Provencher
  - Place Viau
- Verdun
  - Le Campanîle & Place du Commerce
- Ville-Marie, Montreal
  - Le 1000 de la Gauchetière
  - 2020 University
  - Carrefour Industrielle Alliance (formerly Simpsons (department store))
  - Le Centre Eaton Montreal
  - Complexe Les Ailes (formerly Eaton's)
  - Complexe Desjardins
  - Complexe Guy-Favreau (owned by AtkinsRéalis ProFac)
  - Les Cours Mont-Royal
  - Faubourg Sainte-Catherine
  - Place Alexis Nihon (Ville-Marie) (partly in Westmount)
  - Place Bonaventure
  - Place Dupuis
  - Place Montreal Trust
  - Place Ville-Marie
  - Promenades Cathédrale / Tour KPMG
  - Le Swatow Plaza
- Villeray–Saint-Michel–Parc-Extension
  - Centre commercial Le Boulevard (partly in Saint-Leonard)

== Island of Montreal – outside the city of Montreal ==
- Beaconsfield
  - Centre commercial Beaconsfield
- Côte Saint-Luc
  - Cavendish Mall
  - Centre commercial Côte-St-Luc
  - Decarie Square Mall
- Dollard-des-Ormeaux
  - Les Galeries des Sources
  - Marche de l'Ouest
- Dorval
  - Les Jardins Dorval
- Kirkland
  - Centre Kirkland & Centre St-Charles
  - Les Galeries Kirkland
  - Place Kirkland
- Mount Royal
  - Centre commercial Place l'Acadie-Beaumont
  - Centre commercial VMR
  - Centre Rockland–Mount Royal
  - Royalmount
- Pointe-Claire
  - Centre Fairview–Pointe-Claire
  - Plaza Pointe-Claire
- Westmount
  - Westmount Square

== Laval ==
- Laval
  - Carrefour Laval
  - Centre commercial Duvernay
  - Centre commercial Saint-Martin
  - Centre commercial Val-des-Brises
  - Centre Laval
  - Centropolis
  - Galeries Laval
  - Galeries du Moulin
  - Méga-Centre Sainte-Dorothée (A-13 & Notre-Dame Blvd)
  - Méga-Centre Val-des-Brises (A-19 & A-440)
  - SmartCentres Centre
  - SmartCentres East
  - SmartCentres West

== Longueuil ==
- Boucherville
  - Carrefour de la Rive Sud
  - Promenades Montarvilles
- Brossard
  - Champlain Mall (French: Mail Champlain)
  - Place Portobello
  - Quartier DIX30
- Greenfield Park (Longueuil)
  - 5000 Taschereau
  - Galeries Taschereau
  - Place Greenfield Park
- Longueuil
  - Centre Jacques-Cartier
  - Place Desormeaux
  - Place Longueuil
- Saint-Bruno-de-Montarville
  - Promenades Saint-Bruno
- Saint-Hubert (Longueuil)
  - Carrefour Saint-Hubert
  - Centre Cousineau
- Saint-Lambert
  - Carré Saint-Lambert

== Presqu'Île ==
- Pincourt
  - Le Faubourg de l'Île
- Salaberry-de-Valleyfield
  - Centre Valleyfield
- Vaudreuil-Dorion
  - Centre d'achats Hudson
  - Centre d'achats Vaudreuil

== Public markets ==
- Marché Atwater (Montreal)
- Marché Bonsecours (Montreal)
- Marché des Jardiniers (La Prairie)
- Marché Jean-Talon (Montreal)
- Marché Lachine (Lachine)
- Marché Maisonneuve (Montreal)
- Marché Public 440 (Laval)
- Marché Saint-Jacques (Montreal)

== See also ==
- List of small shopping centres in Montreal
- Montreal underground city malls
- List of shopping malls in Greater Longueuil
- List of malls in Toronto
- List of shopping malls in Saskatoon
- List of largest shopping malls in Canada
- List of shopping malls in Canada
