= Yves Trudeau (artist) =

Canadian artist (1930–2017)

Yves Trudeau CM
- Born: December 3, 1930; Montreal, Quebec, Canada
- Died: December 18, 2017 (aged 87); Montreal, Quebec, Canada
- Occupation: Sculptor

Yves Trudeau CM RCA (December 3, 1930 – December 18, 2017) was a Canadian sculptor and a prominent figure in 20th-century art in Quebec, especially public art.

== Life and career ==
Yves Trudeau studied at the École des Beaux-Arts de Montréal and began his career in the 1950s. At first concentrating on bronze sculptures, he later incorporated wood and iron into his works.

In 1960, he founded the Association des sculpteurs du Québec (today the Conseil de la sculpture du Québec), a professional association for Quebec sculptors. He created numerous significant public sculptures and took part in significant group and individual shows throughout Canada and Europe.

He received the Order of Canada in 1995.

== Major public works ==
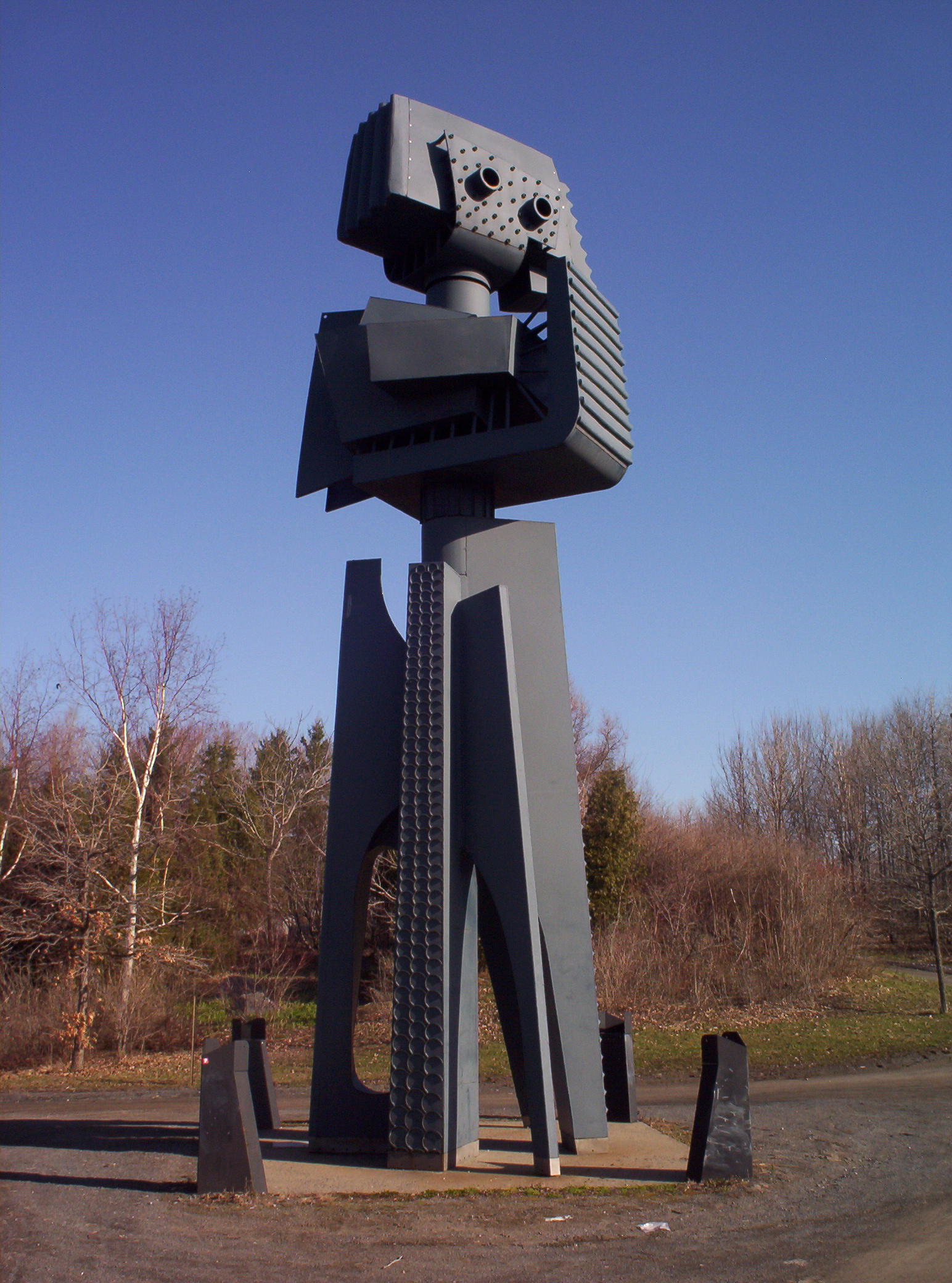
"Le Phare du Cosmos" (1967) (created for Expo 67) in St. Helen's Island in Parc Jean-Drapeau, Montréal, Quebec

Year	Title	Material	Location
1966	Spacio-mobile #1	Steel	Musée de Lachine, Lachine (Montreal)
1966	Vie intérieure	Bronze	Centre Notre-Dame de l'Enfant, Sherbrooke
1967	Le phare du cosmos	Painted steel, kinetic elements	St. Helen's Island, Parc Jean-Drapeau, Montreal (created for Expo 67)
1968	Relief	Concrete, marble, ceramics	Neurology department, Centre hospitalier universitaire de Sherbrooke, Sherbrooke
1968	Relief	Bronze	Pavillon de l'Avenir, Centre de formation professionnelle de Rivière-du-Loup, Rivière-du-Loup
1975	Monument à Alphonse Desjardins	Aluminum	Complexe Desjardins, Montreal (removed in 1995 and moved to Parc Catchpaw,Municipalité d'Orford)
1976	Mur fermé et ouvert #19	Painted steel	Musée d'art de Joliette, Joliette
1978	Mur fermé et ouvert #45	Painted steel	Place du Portage, Gatineau
1981	Trans-Terre	Bronze	Engineering and Visual Arts building, Concordia University, Montreal (formerly at Téléglobe Canada, 1000 de La Gauchetière)
1982	Vortex, rythme séquentiel no. 1	Aluminum	Maison Alcan, Montreal
1984	Vers la lumière	Plaster, light fixtures	CHSLD Centre-Ville-de-Montréal, Montreal
1984	Place de la Découverte	Aluminum, stone, concrete	Place de la Découverte, Gaspé
1985	Relief, négatif positif	Stainless steel	Côte-Vertu metro station, Saint-Laurent (Montreal)
1989	Alfred Rouleau	Bronze	Complexe Desjardins, Montreal
2000	Parvis et portail #22	Aluminum, steel	Place de l'An-2000, Saint-Laurent (Montreal)
