= Montreal Eaton Centre =

Mixed-use in Quebec, Canada

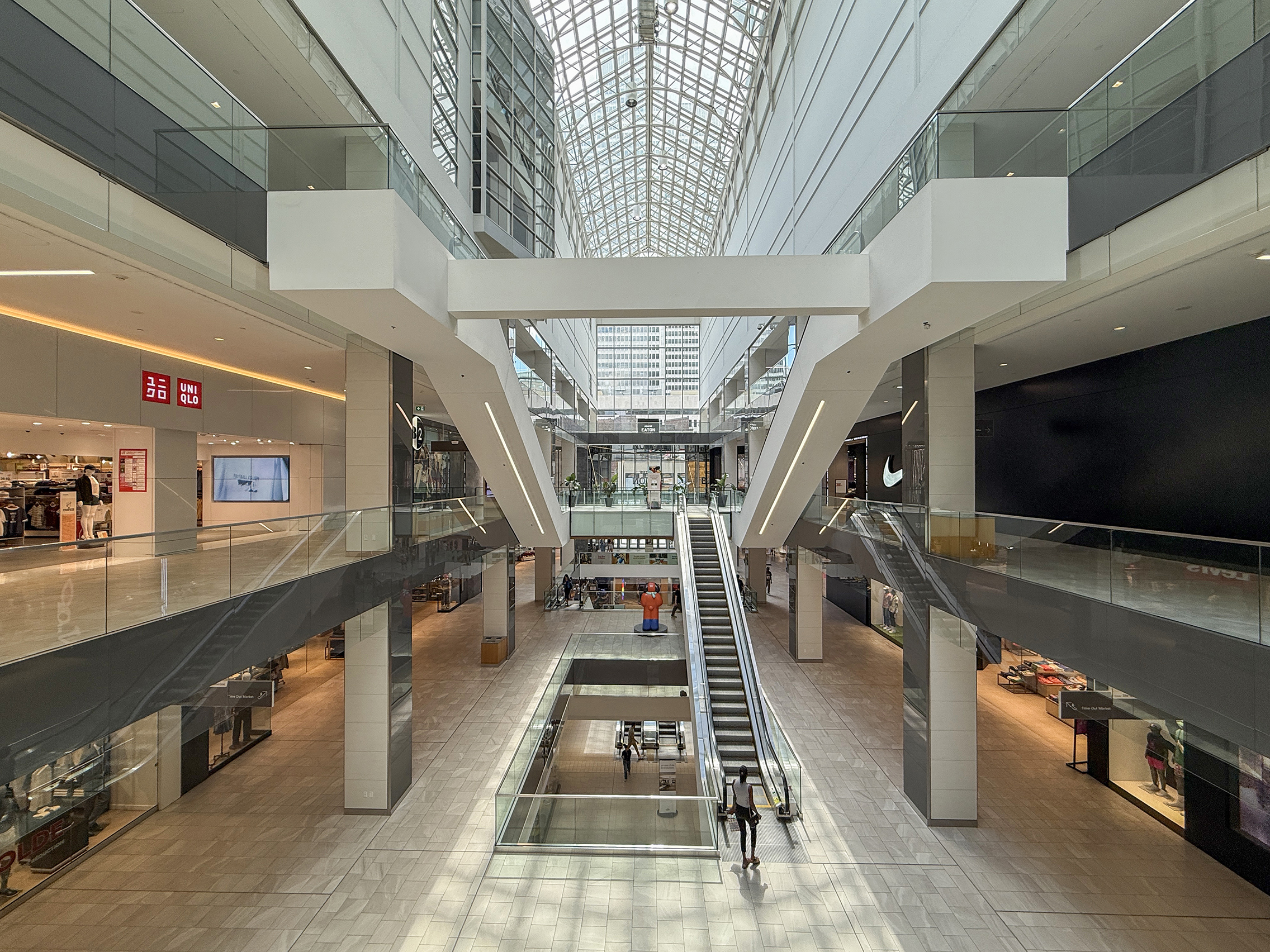
- Mall interior (2026)
- Alternative names: Eaton Centre (colloquial name)

General information
- Status: Operational
- Type: Shopping mall only (1976–1990); Shopping mall and mixed-use (1990–present)
- Location: Montreal, Quebec, Canada
- Coordinates: 45.503°N 73.572°W
- Named for: Eaton's
- Opened: November 14, 1990; 35 years ago
- Owner: Ivanhoé Cambridge
- Operator: JLL Properties

Technical details
- Floor count: 5 (mall arcade); 11 (highest number of levels in office building)
- Floor area: 45,000 square metres (480,000 sq ft) GLA

Design and construction
- Developer: Rouses Quebec Corp. Development; York Hannover Ltd.

Other information
- Number of stores: 125
- Public transit: at McGill; McGill Terminus; STM Buses

Website
- centreeatondemontreal.com
- Shopping mall details
- Les Terrasses
- Address: 705 Saint Catherine Street West
- Opened: 1976; 50 years ago
- Closed: 1987; 39 years ago
- Demolished: 1987–1990
- Developer: The Rouse Company
- Owner: York Hannover Ltd.
- Num. of stores: 140 (at peak)
- Num. of anchor tenants: 1

The Montreal Eaton Centre (French: Centre Eaton de Montréal), colloquially known as the Eaton Centre, is a shopping mall and office complex in the downtown core of Montreal, Quebec, Canada. It is named after the now-defunct Eaton's department store, and with the Toronto Eaton Centre, is one of two remaining Eaton Centres in the country.

The Montreal Eaton Centre opened on November 14, 1990. In 2018, it absorbed its adjacent sister mall Complexe Les Ailes and the two shopping centres were combined into a single property which retained the Montreal Eaton Centre name. As such, the property consists of two separate buildings at 677 Saint Catherine Street West (the former Eaton's flagship store which had become the Complexe Les Ailes mall in 2002) and 705 Saint Catherine Street West (the former Les Terrasses mall, which became the original Montreal Eaton Centre). It is accessible through the Underground City, which is connected to the Montreal Metro's McGill station.

The Montreal Eaton Centre shopping mall has a 45,000 square metres (480,000 sq ft) of gross leasable area. The building features an additional 51,000 square metres (550,000 sq ft) of office space on the upper levels, branded as "1500 University." A bronze statue of hockey player Ken Dryden and a three-storeys-tall tableau made by fine arts enamel painter Bernard Séguin Poirier are located in the mall.

== History ==
=== Background ===
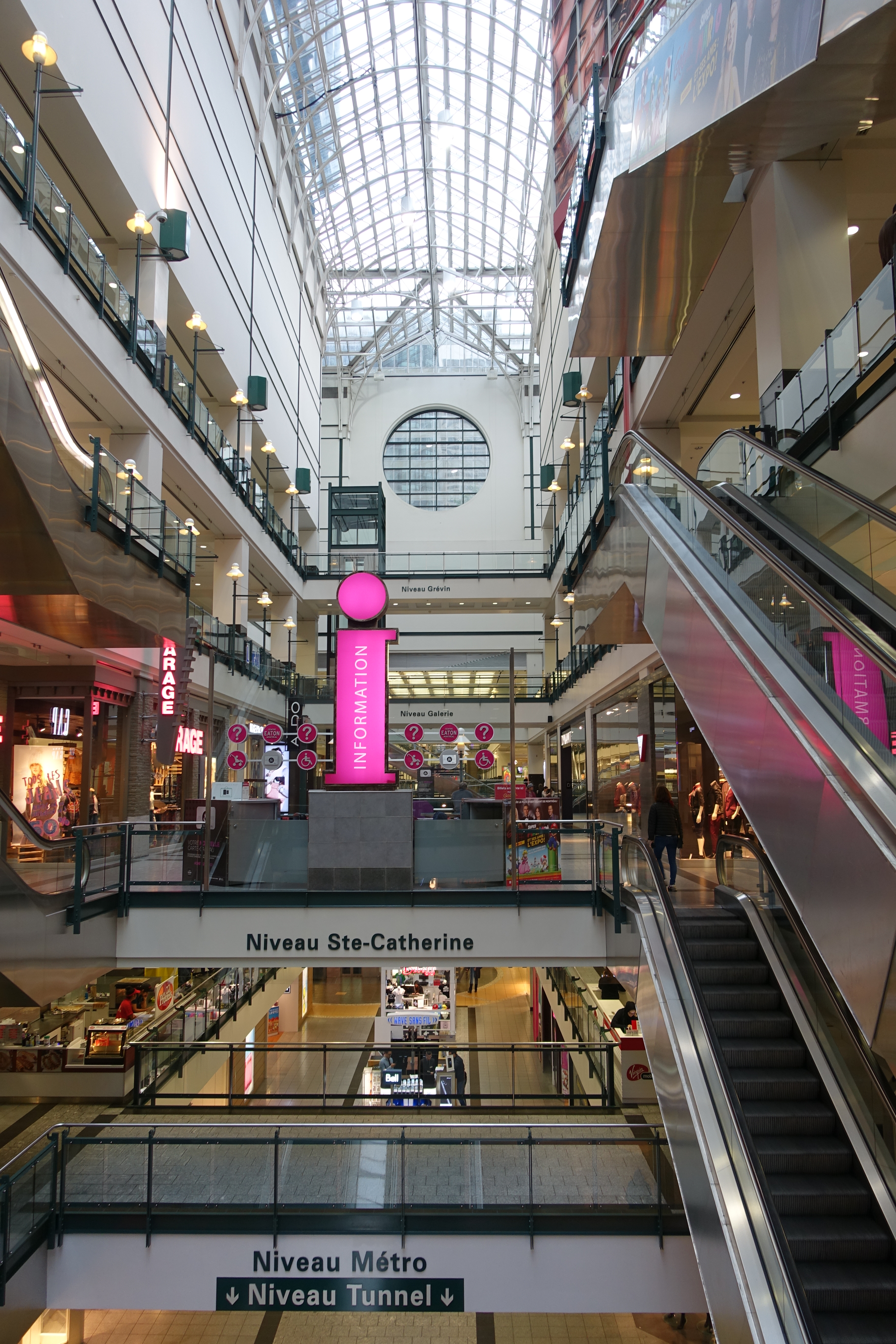
Eaton Centre atrium in 2017 before renovation

Les Terrasses was a shopping mall that originally opened at 705 Saint Catherine Street West. The original mall was developed by the Rouse Company of Columbia, Maryland through affiliate Rouses Quebec Corporation Development, and opened in 1976, built atop the now-defunct Victoria Street; the road and its buildings were expropriated for construction of the mall. The mall layout was a triangular spiral, with gradually-rising interconnected floors, approximately 14 metres (46 ft) high in total. Though it had three escalators, one at each point of the triangle, patrons could gradually walk to the top of the mall. Floors were colour-coded and the mall was adorned with trees, plants and ivy. It housed 140 stores, each facing towards the centre of the triangle.

=== 1978–1990: Development and opening ===
In December 1978, Rouse sold ownership in its Canadian subsidiaries to the Toronto, Ontario-based York Hannover Ltd. for $12.6 million while retaining management to focus on its U.S. properties, which took over operations of Les Terrasses. The mall permanently closed its doors in 1987, and was demolished. The property was redeveloped into the Montreal Eaton Centre, which had its grand opening on November 14, 1990, which was connected to the Montreal Metro, the Underground City, and the Eaton's department store. Eaton's department store, for which it was named, closed in 1999. In September 1997, Cadillac Fairview bought the shopping centre for $113 million from a consortium of lenders that had taken over the Montreal Eaton Centre from its previous owner in 1996. In July 2000, Ivanhoe Corporation acquired the mall through an exchange of assets. Cadillac Fairview ceded the Montreal Eaton Centre in exchange for Ivanhoe's stakes in Carrefour Laval and Promenades Saint-Bruno.

=== 2014–present: Expansions ===
In March 2014, Ivanhoé Cambridge had announced it would add Complexe Les Ailes with the Montreal Eaton Centre, and the newly merged complex would be renamed, dropping the Eaton Centre branding in the process. However, it was later decided that Complexe Les Ailes would just be used to expand the Montreal Eaton Centre, and preserve the latter's name. The two malls were renovated to have the same "look and feel". and in coming full circle, brought the Eaton's name back to the building that once housed Montreal's flagship Eaton's department store.

A 32,000 sq ft (3,000 m^{2}) flagship Uniqlo would open at the mall in October 2020. KaleMart24 rapidly expanded, announcing that they would open a storefront at the Montreal Eaton Centre in early January 2026. On February 24, 2026, JLL unveiled the Les Terrasses, Espace Restos food court on the Tunnel level as a tribute to the original 1976 mall to replace the aging lower-level food court.

== Goodwin's / Eaton's ==
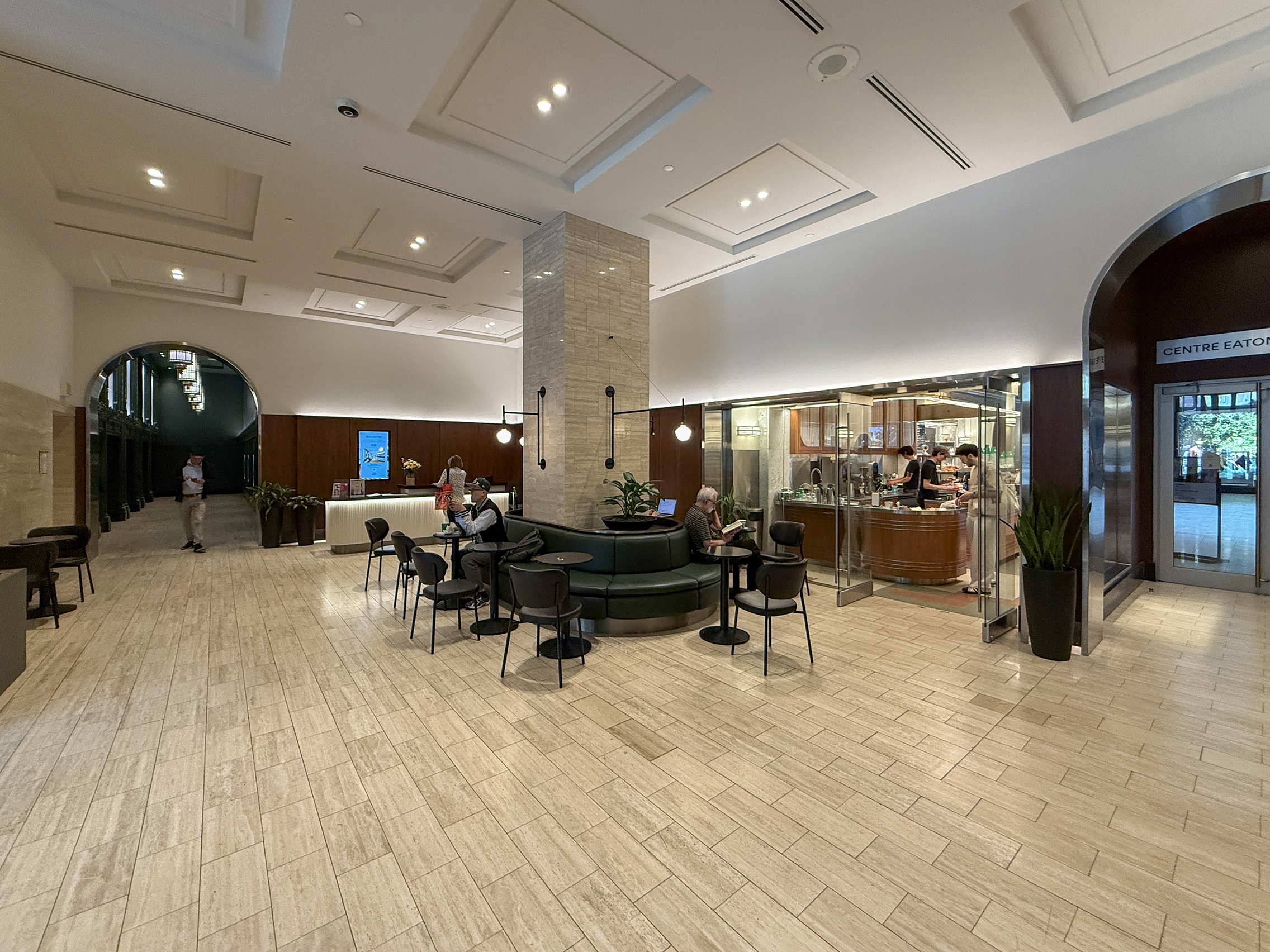
1500 Blvd Robert-Bourassa lobby (2026)

The building at 677 Saint Catherine Street West was originally three storeys tall, and was built for the Goodwin's department store in the early 1900s. The building was sold to Eaton's in 1925, at which time it was referred to as the Eaton's building. Through the Ross and Macdonald architecture firm, the first three-floor expansion was completed in 1927, and the second three-floor expansion was completed between 1930 and 1931.

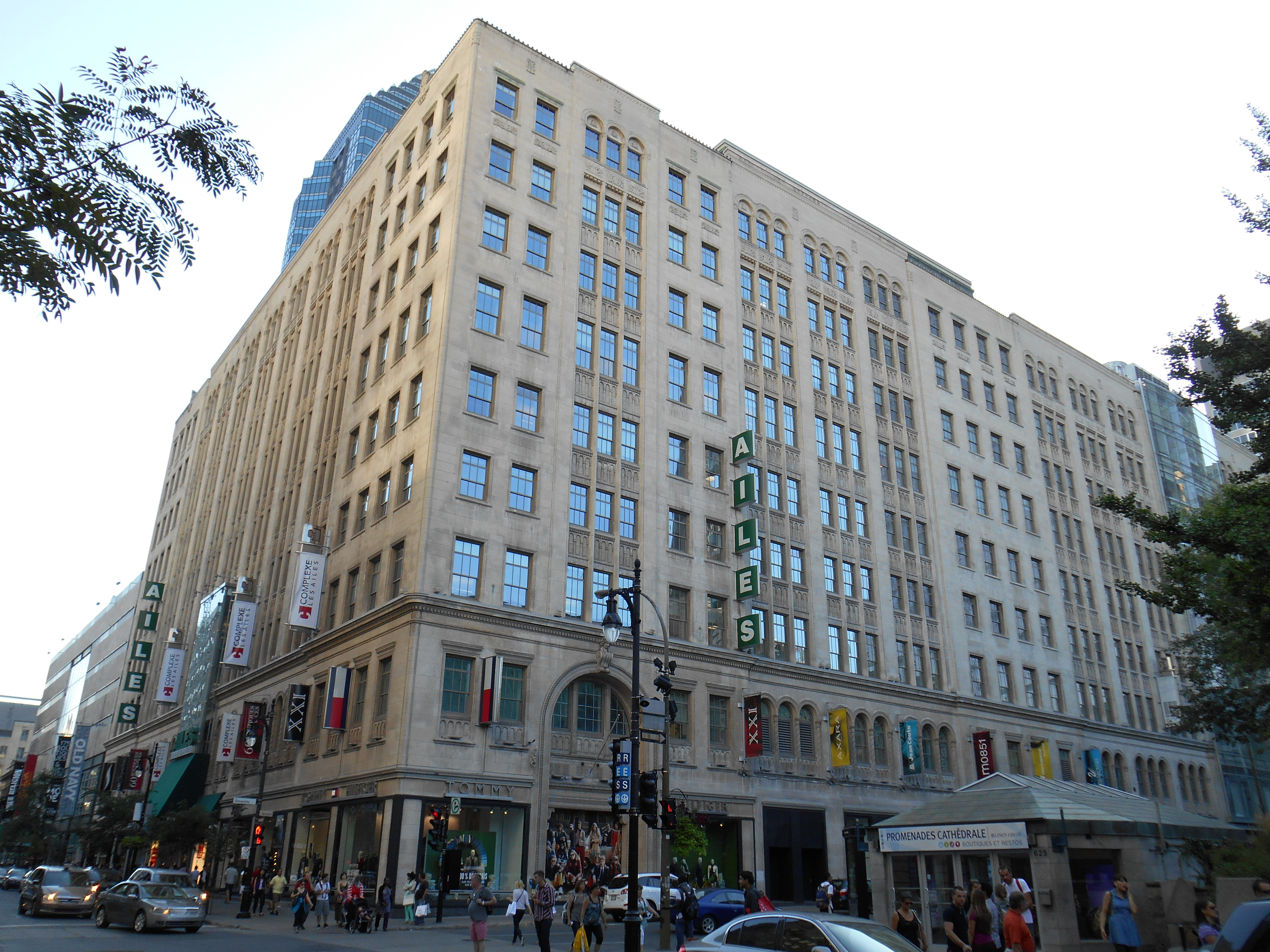
Exterior view (August 2013)

The top floor included Eaton's Ninth Floor Restaurant, which features an Art Deco design that was inspired by the dining room of the SS Île-de-France and was created following Jacques Carlu's plans. The building was expanded toward de Maisonneuve Boulevard between 1958 and 1959, and access to the Montreal Metro via McGill station in 1967. The Eaton's building was home to Montreal's largest department store for decades.

In 1999, following the closure of the Eaton's chain, Ivanhoé Cambridge acquired the property. After considerable redevelopment work between 2000 and 2002, involving the total gutting and complete redesign/rebuilding of the interior (preserving only the exterior facade and parts of the 9th floor), the former flagship of the Montreal retail scene was transformed into the building known as Complexe Les Ailes and 1500 University. At this time, Place Montreal Trust, the Montreal Eaton Centre and Complexe Les Ailes constituted Ivanhoé Cambridge's self-branded Sh3pping trio of shopping malls.

For over a decade, the new mall was named after the Les Ailes de la Mode department store which occupied a third of its total area and was its main retailer. When the store closed in 2016, and the company permanently ceased operation, the mall's name would be changed. In 2019, Les Ailes' former store space was taken over by Decathlon, which today is one of the largest tenants of the now merged Montreal Eaton Centre.

== Gallery ==
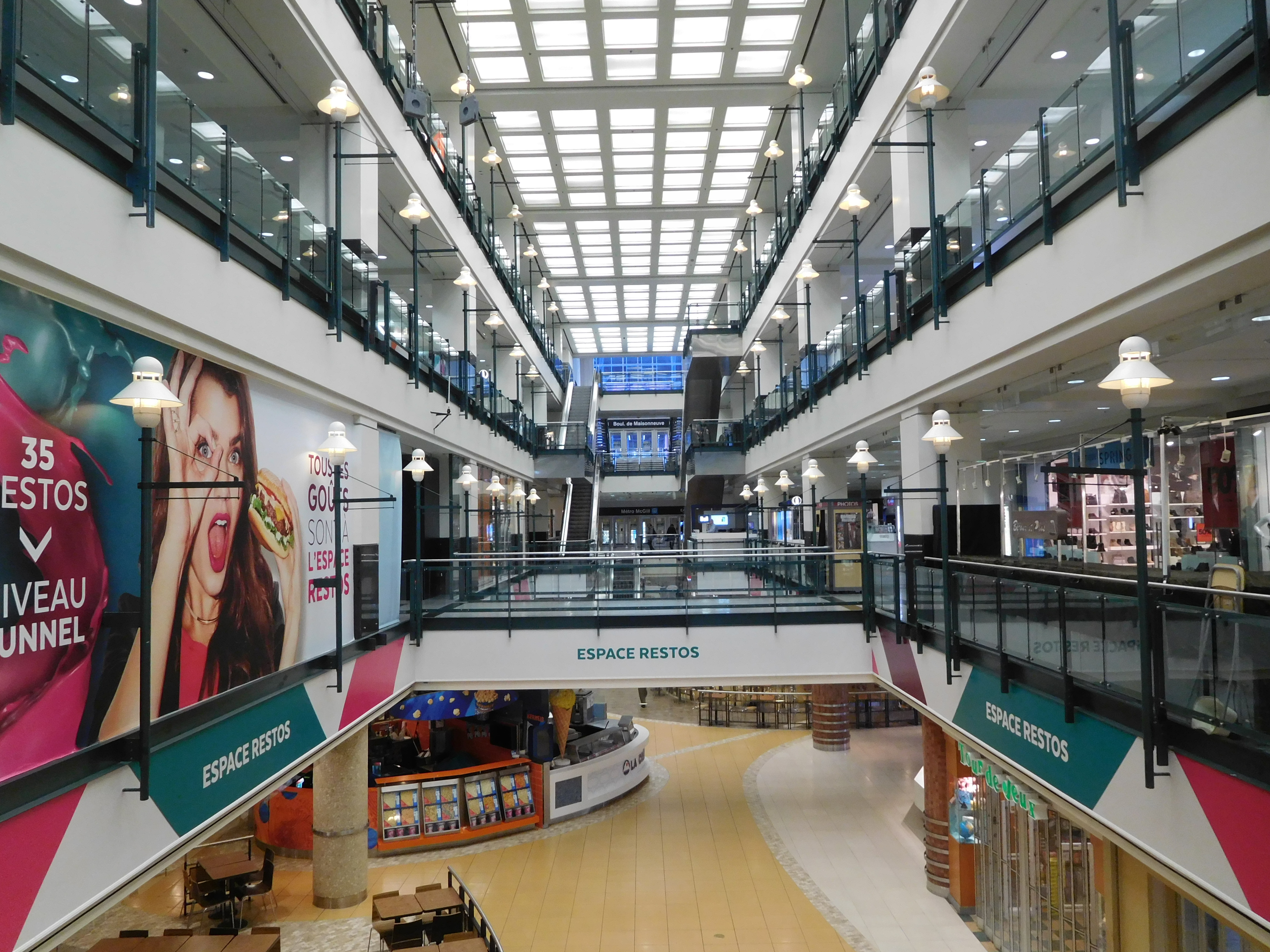
Pre-renovation (January 2017)

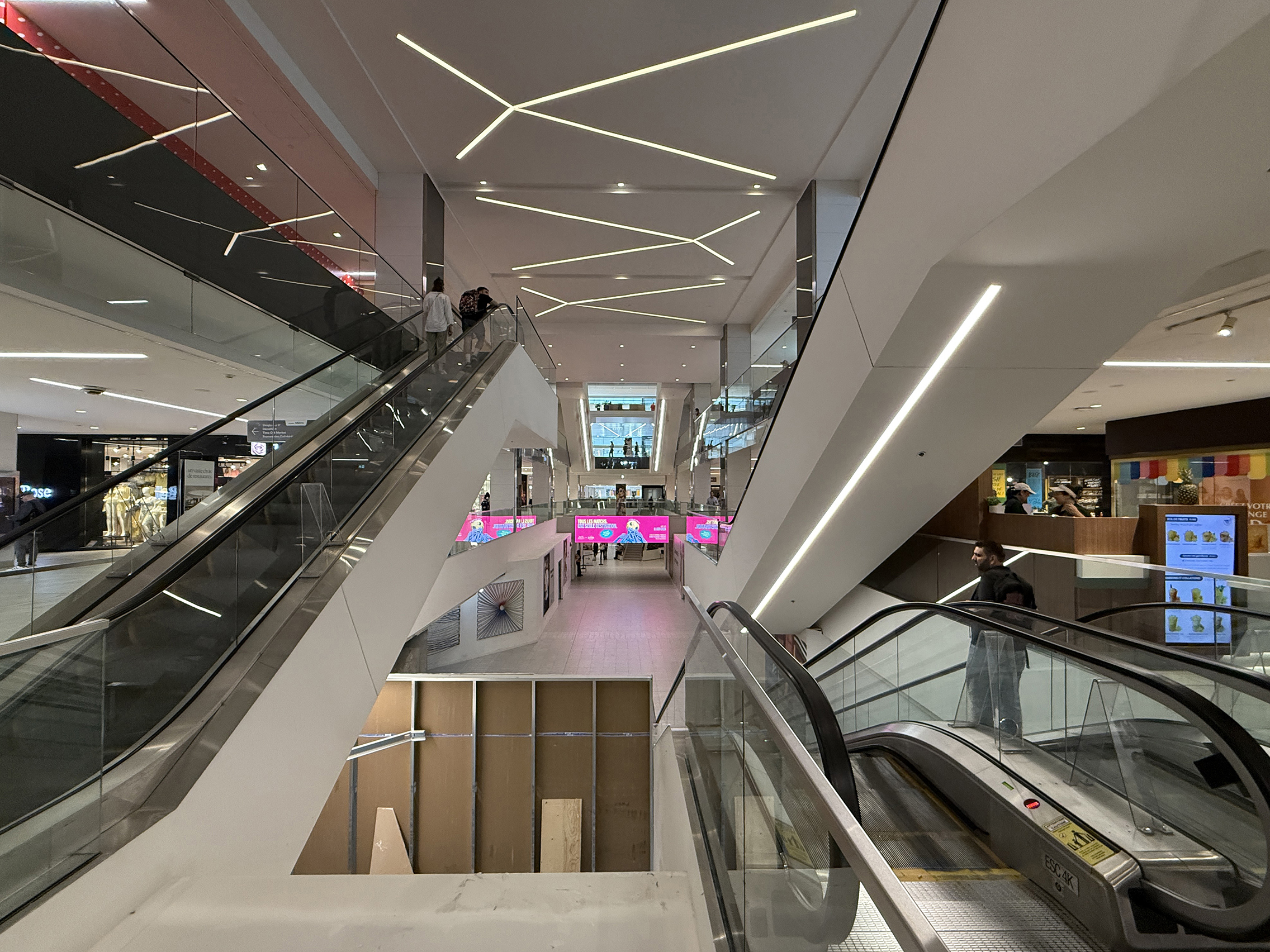
Void in Metro Level after renovation (2026)

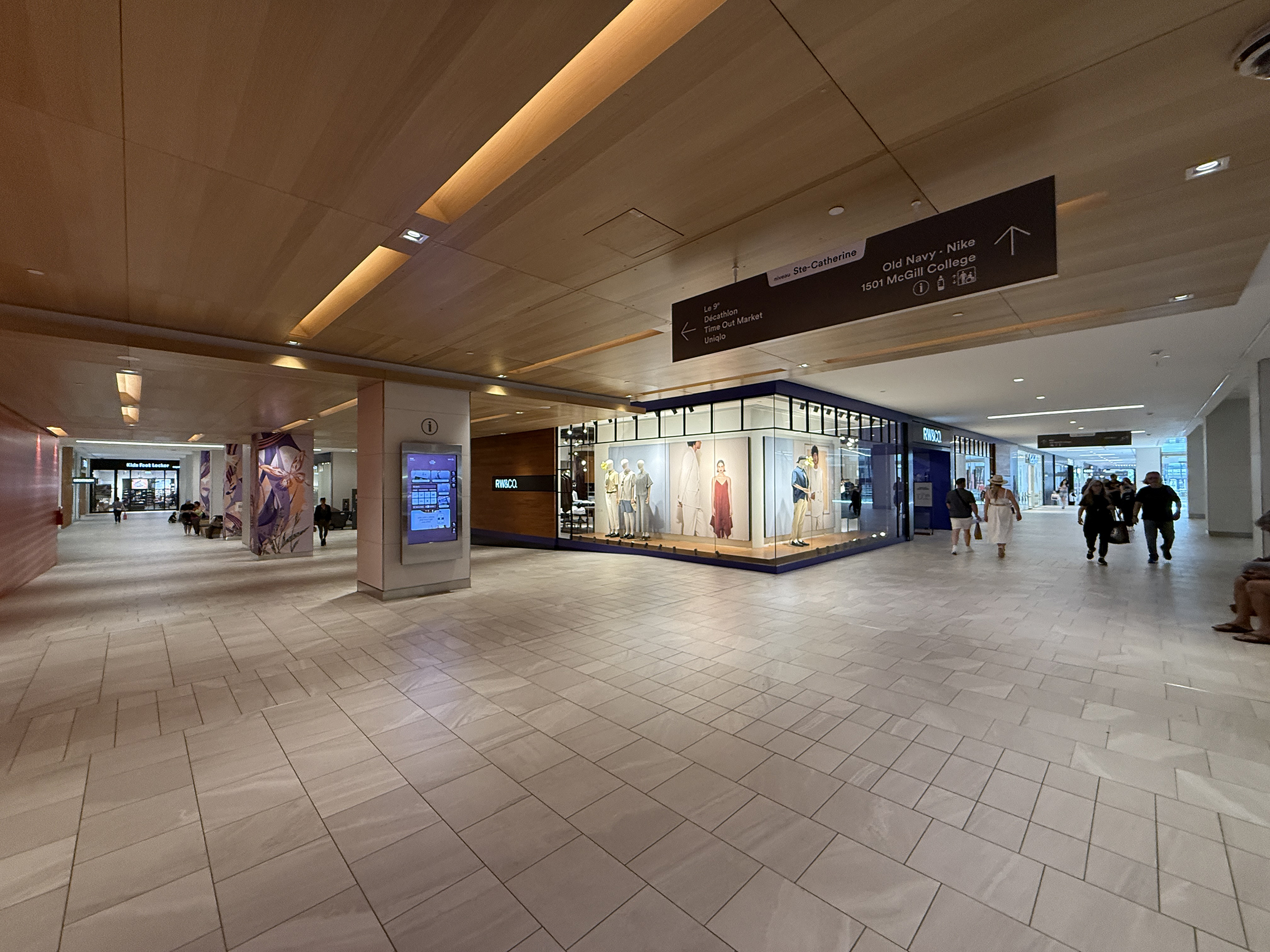
Ste-Catherine Level (2026)

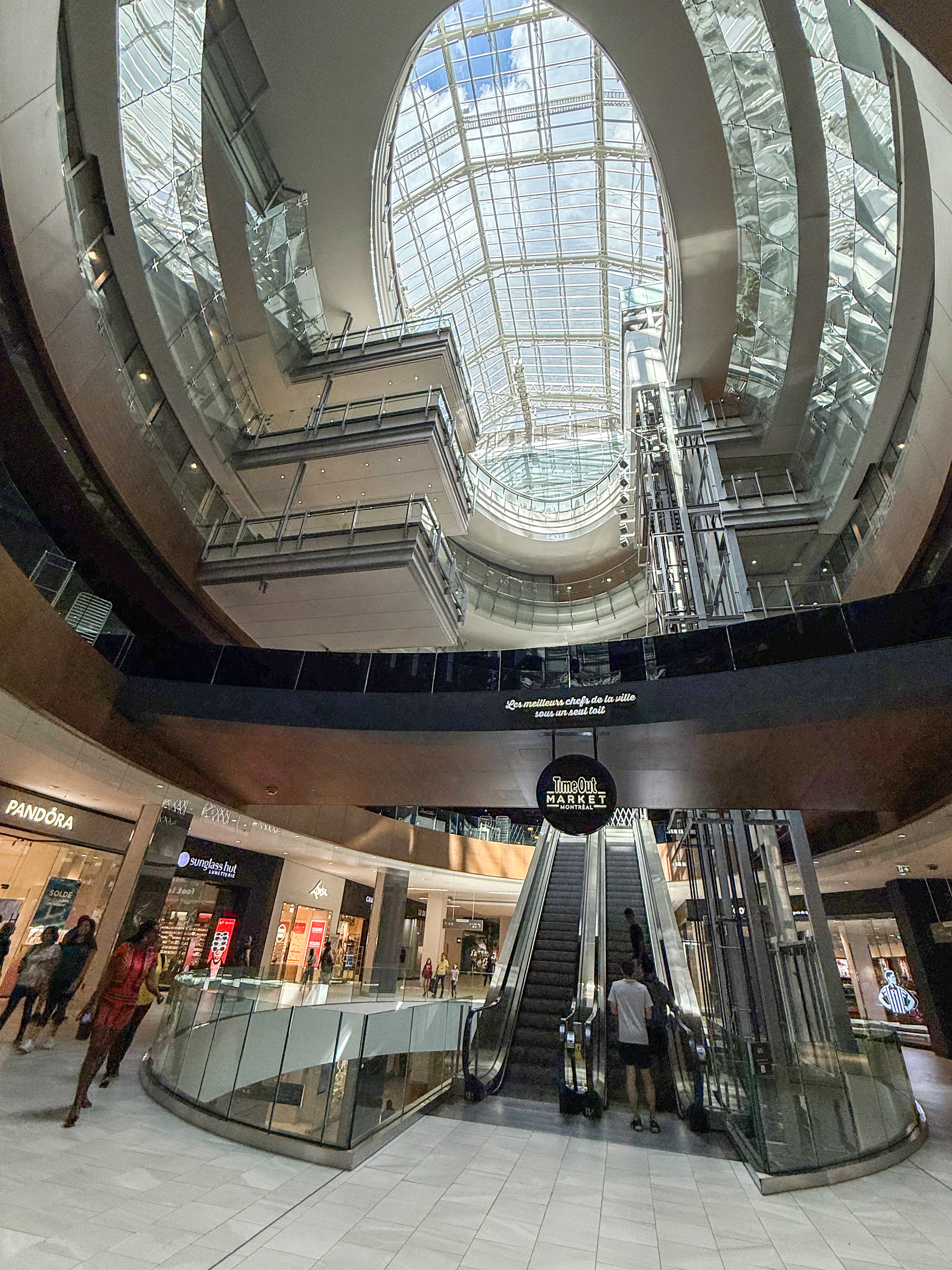
Atrium in expansion area (2026)

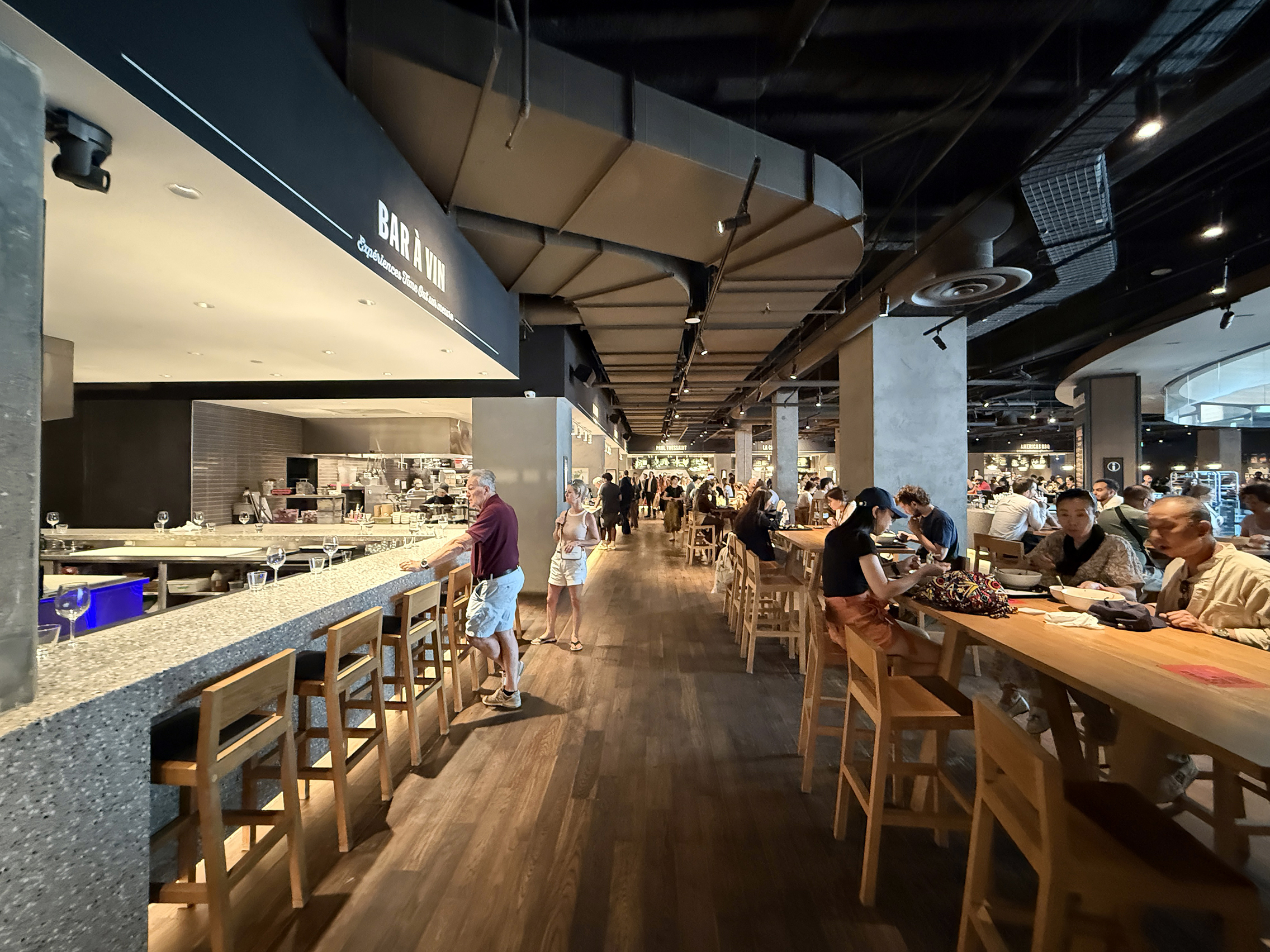
Time Out Market (2026)

== See also ==
- CrossIron Mills
- Eaton Centre
- Sherway Gardens
- List of shopping malls in Montreal
- Vaughan Mills
- National Place Building
