= Underground City, Montreal =

Network of buildings in Quebec, Canada

Coordinates: 45.503°N 73.572°W

RÉSO
- Location: Montreal, Quebec, Canada; some segments in Westmount
- Opened: 1962
- Num. of stores: +1600
- Floors: Usually 3 or 4, sometimes 2

RÉSO, commonly referred to as the Underground City (French: La ville souterraine), is the name applied to a series of interconnected office towers, hotels, shopping centres, residential and commercial complexes, convention halls, universities and performing arts venues that form the heart of Montreal's central business district, colloquially referred to as Downtown Montreal. The name refers to the underground connections between the buildings that compose the network, in addition to the network's complete integration with the city's entirely underground rapid transit system, the Montreal Metro.

The first iteration of the Underground City was developed out of the open pit at the southern entrance to the Mount Royal Tunnel, where Place Ville Marie and Central Station stand today.

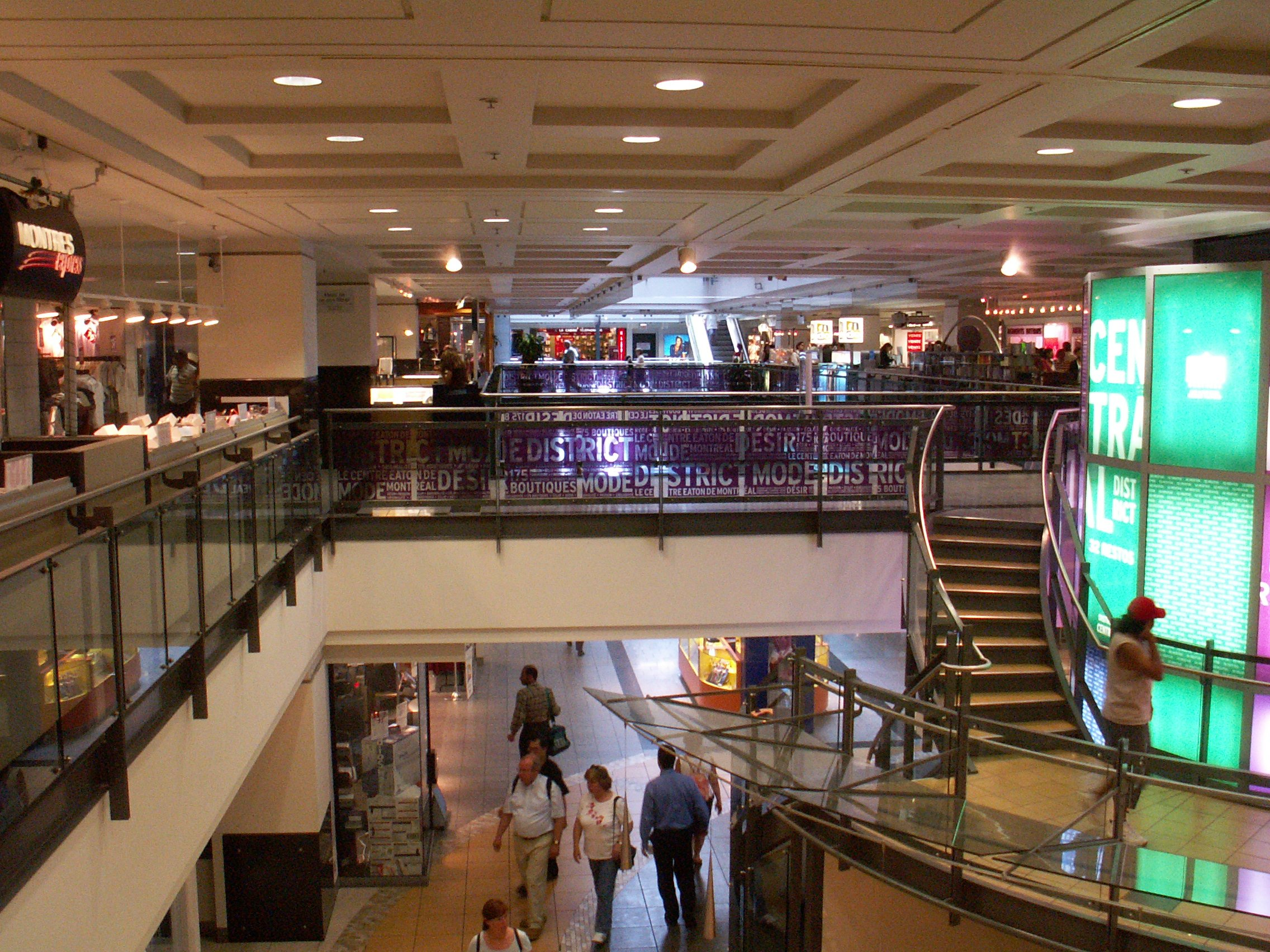
The lower floors of the Eaton Centre between the McGill and Peel Metro stations

Though most of the connecting tunnels pass underground, many of the key passageways and principal access points are located at ground level, and there is also one skybridge (between Lucien-L'Allier Metro station and Gare Lucien L'Allier). In this regard, the Underground City is more of an indoor city (ville intérieure) than a truly subterranean city, although there are vast commercial sectors located entirely underground.

The network is particularly useful during Montreal's long winters, during which time well over half a million people are estimated to use it every day. The network is largely climate controlled and well-lit, and is arranged in a U-shape with two principal north–south axes connected by an east–west axis. Combined, there are 32 kilometres (20 mi) of tunnels over 12 square kilometres (4.6 mi^{2}) of the most densely populated part of Montreal. In total, there are more than 120 exterior access points to the network, not including the sixty or so Metro station entrances located outside the official limits of the RÉSO, some of which have their own smaller tunnel networks. Some of the city's larger institutions, namely McGill University, the Montreal Museum of Fine Arts, Concordia University, Université de Montréal and the Université du Québec à Montréal also have campus tunnel networks separate from the underground city.

== Overview ==
In 2004, the downtown network of the underground city was re-branded and given the name RÉSO, which is a homophone of the French word réseau, or network. The "O" at the end of the word is stylized as the logo of the Montreal Metro. Schematic maps bearing the RÉSO logo are found throughout the network. The largest and best-known segment is located in the centre of downtown, delimited by the Peel and Place-des-Arts Metro stations on the Green Line and the Lucien-L'Allier and Place-d'Armes stations on the Orange Line.

The underground city is promoted as an important tourist attraction by most Montreal travel guidebooks. For most Montrealers, however, it tends to be considered more as a large mall complex linking Metro stations—they may not even know they are in it. Many Canadian cities have some kind of tunnel or skywalk system downtown to help people avoid the weather. Most parts of the Montreal underground city are open while the Metro is in operation (5:30 AM to 1:00 AM), though some are closed outside of business hours. Maps of the underground city and the Metro can be obtained free of charge from all Metro stations, and the network of buildings is indicated on most maps of the downtown core.

Nearly 500,000 people use it per day. It is also the largest underground pedestrian network in the world. It stretches for 32 kilometers (20 miles) and covers 4 million square meters (one and a half square miles). According to official statistics, its corridors link up with 10 metro stations, 2 bus terminals, 1,200 offices, about 2,000 stores including 2 major department stores, approximately 1,600 housing units, 200 restaurants, 40 banks, movie theatres providing 40 screens and other entertainment venues, 7 major hotels, 4 universities, Place des Arts, a cathedral, the Bell Centre (home of the Montreal Canadiens), and 3 exhibition halls: the Place Bonaventure, the Convention Centre (Palais des Congrès de Montréal) and the Olympic Centre.

== History of the central segment ==
The vision for the underground city was originally that of urbanist Vincent Ponte, for whom a commemorative plaque was unveiled in November 2006 at Place Ville Marie. The first link of the underground city arose with the construction of the Place Ville Marie office tower and underground shopping mall, opened in 1962 and built to cover an unsightly pit of railway tracks north of the Central Station. Two tunnels linked it to Central Station and the Queen Elizabeth Hotel.

The advent of the Montreal Metro in 1966, in time for Expo 67, brought tunnels joining Bonaventure station to the Château Champlain hotel, the Place du Canada office tower, Place Bonaventure, Central Station, and Windsor Station, forming the core of the Underground City. Square-Victoria–OACI station connected to the Tour de la Bourse, Montreal's stock exchange building.

Adding to the development of the underground city was the Montreal Urban Community Transit Commission's policy of offering the aerial rights above Metro station entrances for construction through emphyteutic leases, an advantageous way to acquire prime real estate. When the Metro began running in 1966, ten buildings were already connected directly to Metro stations; development would continue until only three free-standing station entrances (Square-Victoria–OACI, Saint-Laurent and Place-des-Arts) remained in the central segment.

In 1974, the Complexe Desjardins office tower complex was constructed, spurring the construction of a "second downtown" underground city segment between Place-des-Arts and Place-d'Armes stations, via Place des Arts, Complexe Desjardins, the Complexe Guy Favreau federal government building, and the Palais des Congrès (convention centre).

Between 1984 and 1992, the underground city expanded, with the construction of three major linked shopping centres in the Peel and McGill Metro station areas: Cours Mont-Royal, Place Montréal-Trust, and the Promenades Cathédrale (built underneath Christ Church Cathedral). McGill station was already linked with The Bay, Eaton's (now the Complexe Les Ailes), Centre Eaton, and two other office/mall complexes. Between 1984 and 1989, the underground city grew from 12 km (7 mi) of passages to almost 22 km (14 mi).

Mega-projects added to the size of the network throughout the 1990s, including Le 1000 De La Gauchetière (the tallest building in Montreal), Le 1250 René-Lévesque, and the Montreal World Trade Centre. Although these buildings have only a secondary commercial sector, they use their connection to the underground city as a selling point for their office space. Also, the construction of a tunnel between Eaton Centre and Place Ville-Marie consolidated the two central halves of the underground city. The construction of the Bell (originally Molson) Centre connected Lucien-L'Allier Metro station to the underground city, as well as replacing Windsor Station with the new Gare Lucien-L'Allier commuter train station.

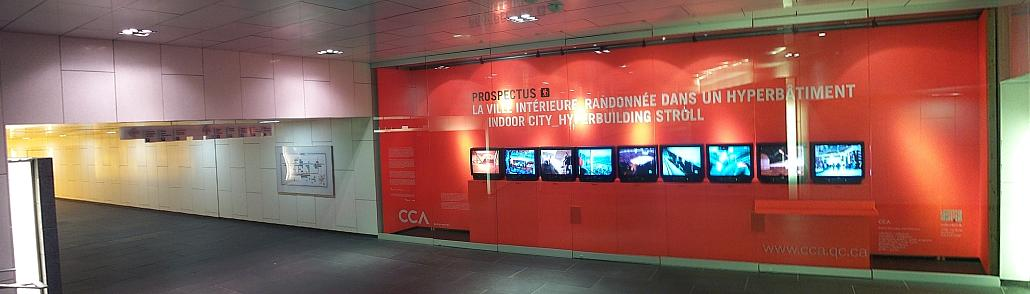
The tunnel between the Centre CDP Capital and the Palais des Congrès. A display case sponsored by the Canadian Centre for Architecture holds a video artwork about the underground city.

Most recently, in 2003, the complete redevelopment of the Quartier international de Montréal consolidated several segments of the central underground city with continuous pedestrian corridors. The construction of the ICAO headquarters joined Place Bonaventure to Square-Victoria–OACI station, which in turn was joined to the Palais des Congrès and Place-d'Armes station via the new Caisse de dépôt et de placement building and a tunnel under Place Jean-Paul Riopelle. Uniquely, the new tunnel sections in the Quartier International contain educational and artistic displays sponsored by major Montreal museums. As a result of this construction, one can now walk all the way across the centre of downtown, from the UQAM Sherbrooke Pavilion at the corner of Sainte Famille Street and Sherbrooke Street to the Lucien-L'Allier Metro station just south-west of the Bell Centre, without going outside—a span of 1.7 km (1.1 mi) as the crow flies, or approximately 3 kilometres (2 mi) walking distance.

=== Structural concerns, 2007 closure ===
On Friday, August 24, 2007, construction crews discovered a seven-meter (23 foot) long fissure in the ceiling of an underground corridor linking the McGill station to The Bay store located under de Maisonneuve Boulevard, between Aylmer Street and Union Avenue. The station, the Underground City shops, and above ground streets and buildings were closed to assess whether there was any risk of collapse of the structure. Service on the Métro Green Line was halted between Berri–UQAM and Lionel-Groulx stations until Sunday evening. According to a spokesperson for the Hudson's Bay Company, city workers may have caused the damage by hitting a nearby pillar.

During the weekend, city workcrews worked non-stop to shore up the sagging slab of concrete, installing more than 1,000 temporary metal supports.

On Monday, August 27, 2007, service was restored to the Green Line, and all streets but the block of de Maisonneuve boulevard between Union and Aylmer were reopened to traffic. The one block that was not open to traffic was open to pedestrians. All buildings reopened, including The Bay. Officials said that it would take months to fix the problem. While inspecting the site, it was discovered that 2021 Union, the Parkade Montreal building, was in danger of having concrete side panels fall off. City engineers performed emergency repairs. A report later blamed the construction of a bike path for the damage. Street traffic on De Maisonneuve resumed in March 2008.

== Central segment ==
The central segment interconnects the following seven Metro stations via indoor walkway. As Berri–UQAM station, which allows transfers between the Green, Orange and Yellow lines, is two metro stops from the closest station in this segment, in many cases it is quicker to walk than to take the metro. The lists of connected facilities which follow are grouped by segment and nearest metro station.

=== Bonaventure ===
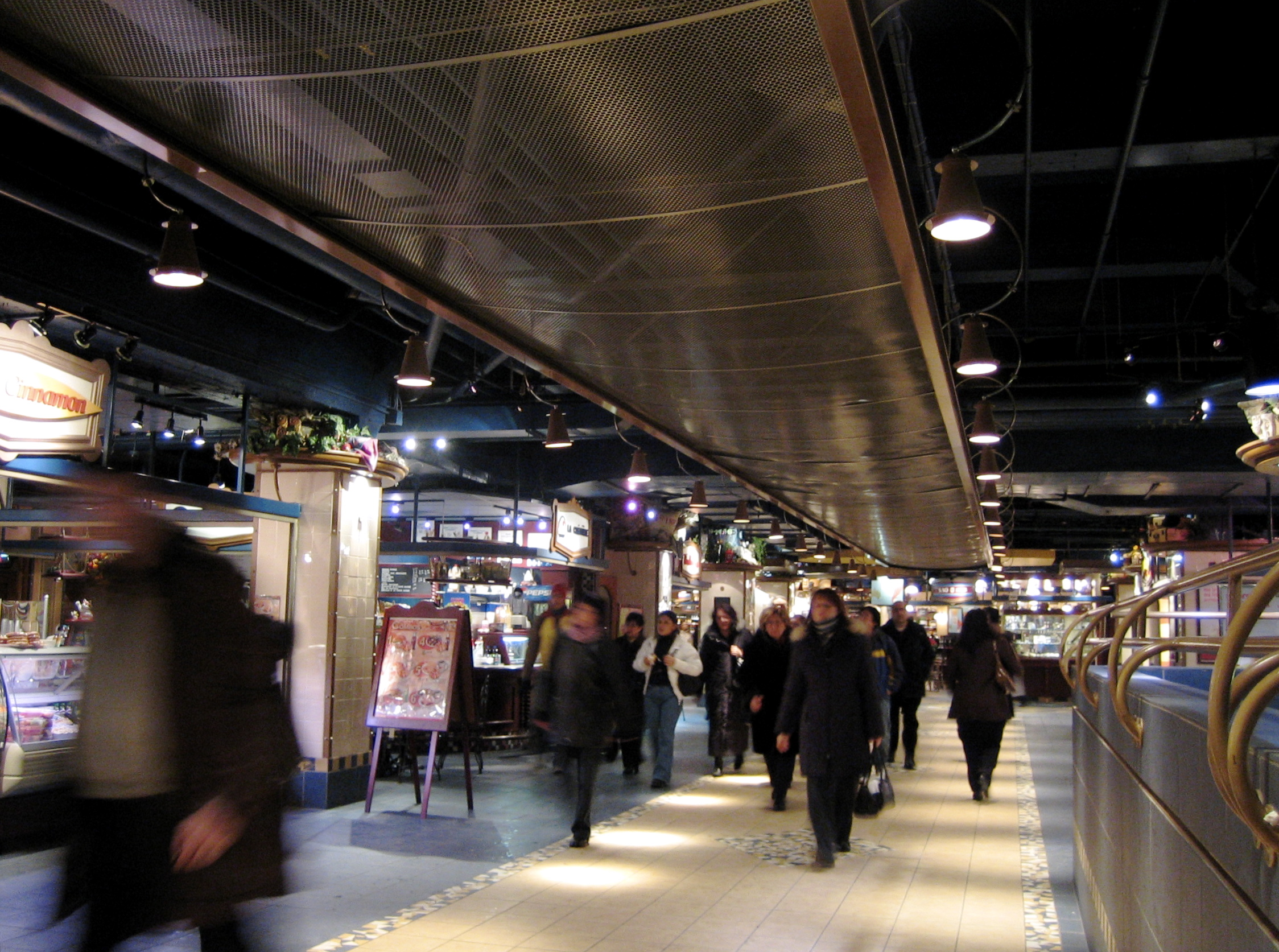
Halles de la gare, going from Central Station to Place Ville-Marie

- Place Bonaventure
  - STM headquarters
  - (access to Square-Victoria-OACI Metro station via ICAO Building)
- Place Ville-Marie
  - (access to McGill Metro station via Le Centre Eaton)
- Édifice Gare Windsor – former Canadian Pacific Railway headquarters
  - (access to Lucien-L'Allier Metro station via Bell Centre)
- 1250 René Lévesque
- Place du Canada – Château Champlain Hotel
- Central Station – Via Rail, AMT, Amtrak, and REM
  - Les Halles de la Gare
  - CN headquarters
- Queen Elizabeth Hotel
- Le 1000 de La Gauchetière
  - RTL Terminus Centre-Ville (suburban bus terminal)

=== Square-Victoria–OACI ===
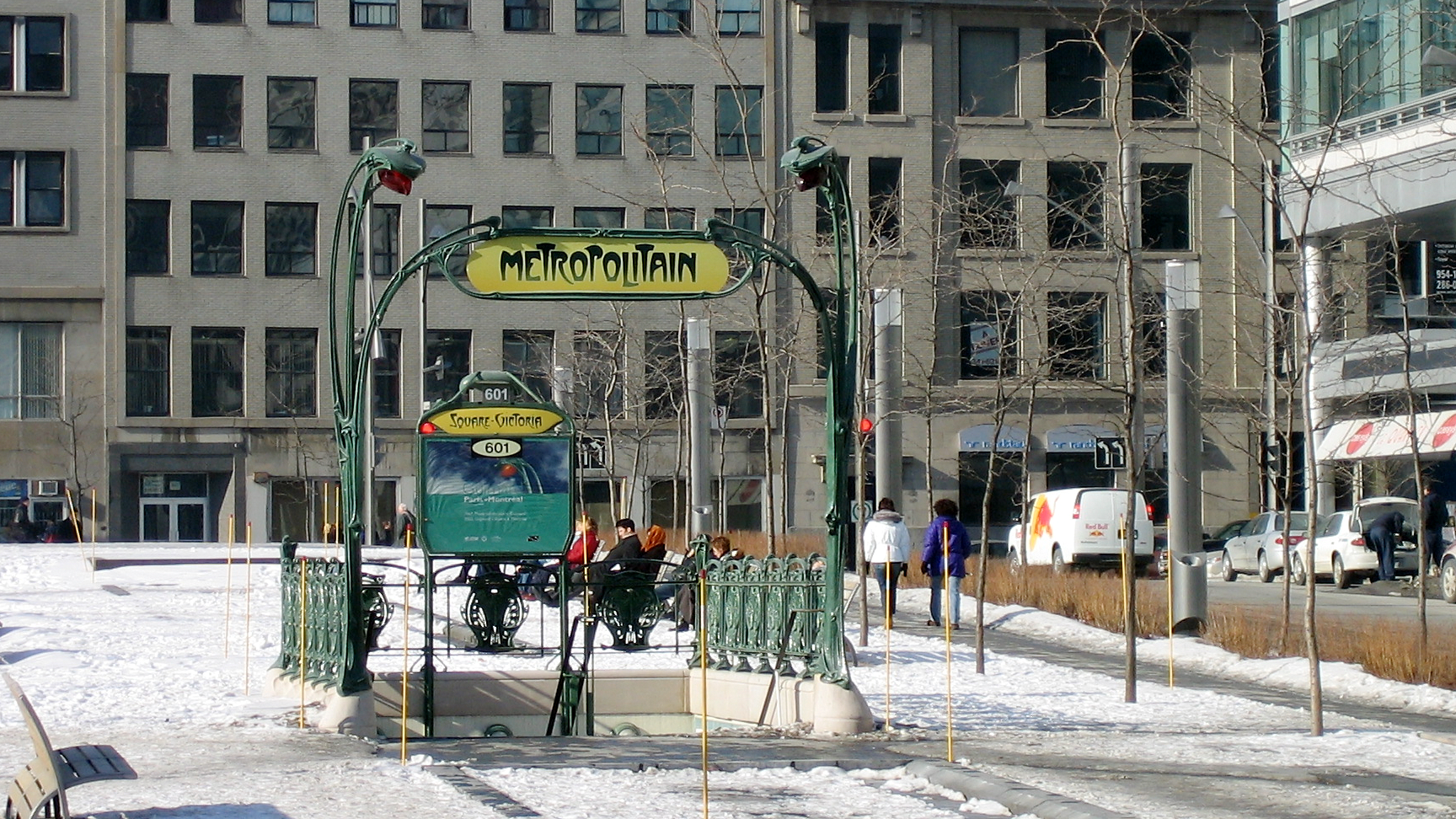
Square-Victoria-OACI Metro entrance, featuring the Paris Metro style entrance which was restored in 2003

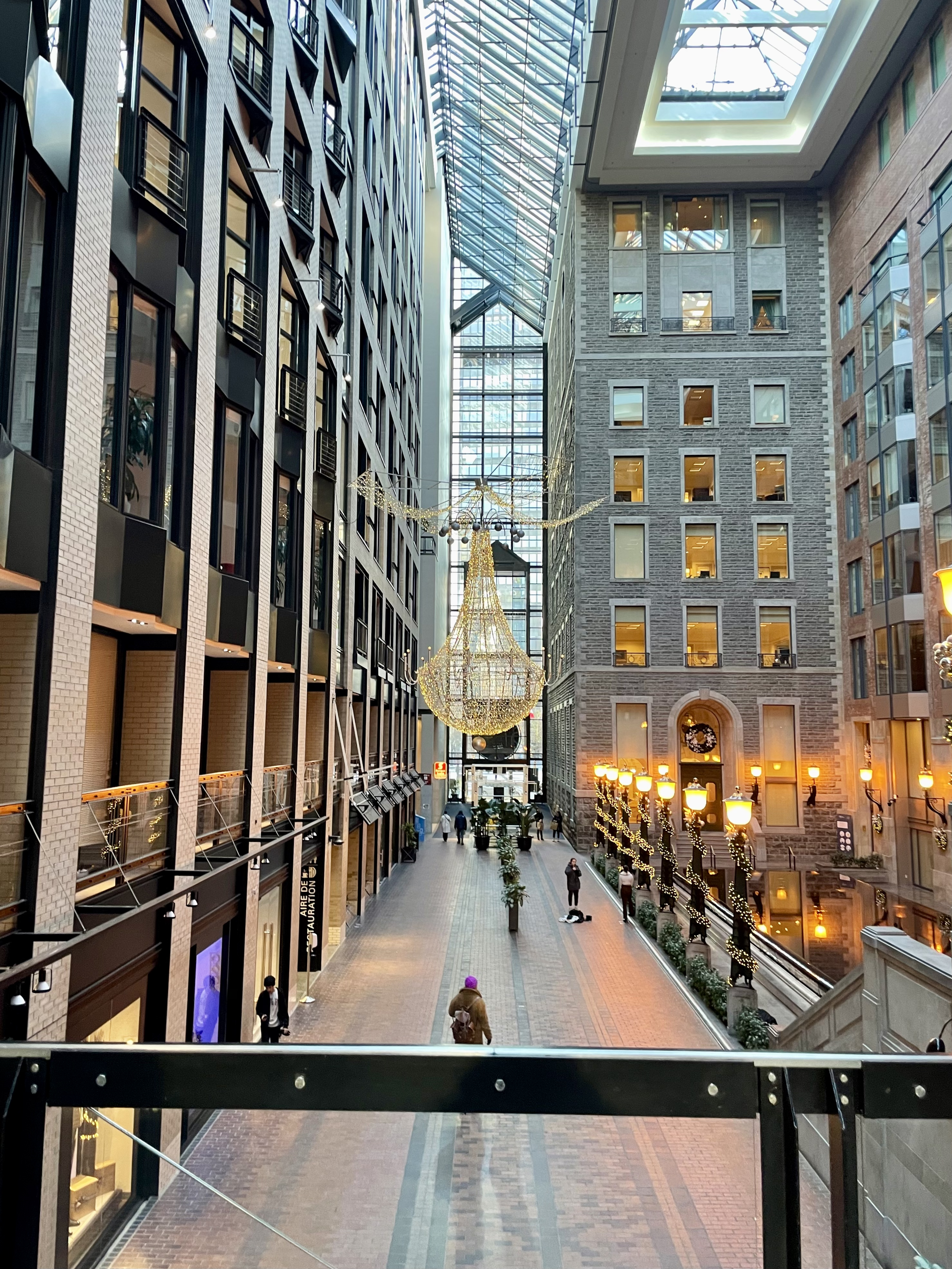
Inside the underground portion of the Centre de commerce mondial de Montréal

- ICAO (International Civil Aviation Organization)
  - (access to Bonaventure Metro station via Place Bonaventure)
- Place de la Cité internationale
  - CDP (Caisse de dépôt et placement du Québec)
  - W Hotel
  - (access to Place-d'Armes Metro station via Palais des Congrès)
- Centre de commerce mondial de Montréal
  - Canada Steamship Lines Building
  - InterContinental Hotel
  - Le St. James Hotel
- Place Victoria
  - Tour de la Bourse (Montreal Exchange)
  - Hôtel Delta Centre-Ville
- Complexe Maisonneuve
- 1080 Beaver Hall Hill
- Tour Aimia/Altoria

=== Place-d'Armes ===
- Palais des congrès de Montréal
  - (access to Square-Victoria-OACI Metro station via Place de la Cité internationale)
- 205 Rue Viger Ouest – Collège supérieur de Montréal
- Complexe Guy-Favreau (Government of Canada)
  - (access to Place-des-Arts Metro station via Complexe Desjardins)

=== Place-des-Arts ===
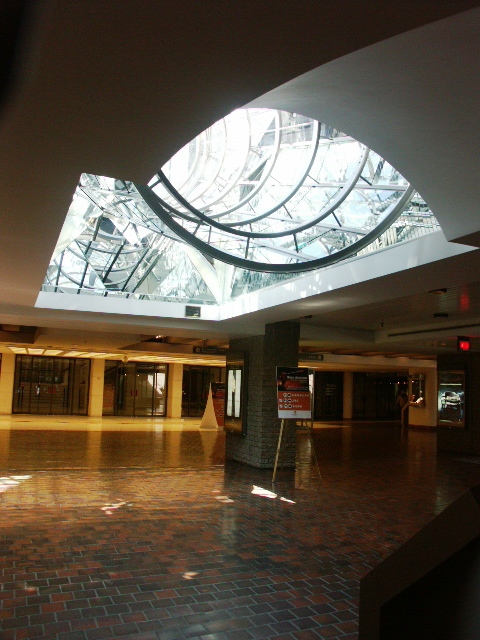
Skylight in Place des Arts corridor towards Metro station

- Complexe Desjardins
  - Hôtel DoubleTree by Hilton
  - (access to Place-d'Armes Metro station via Complexe Guy-Favreau)
- UQAM (Université du Québec à Montréal)
  - Président-Kennedy
    - Chimie et Biochimie
    - Coeur des Sciences
    - Sciences Biologiques
  - Sherbrooke
  - Arts IV
- Place des Arts
  - Musée d'art contemporain de Montréal

=== Peel ===
- Carrefour Industrielle Alliance (formerly Simpsons)
  - Cinema Banque Scotia (IMAX) (formerly Cinema Paramount)
  - La Maison Simons
  - (access to McGill Metro station via Place Montréal Trust)
- Royal & Sun Alliance
- Tour La Maritime
- Place Montreal Trust
- Tour Scotia
- Centre Mont-Royal
- Le 2000 Peel
- Roots Canada
- Les Cours Mont-Royal

=== McGill ===
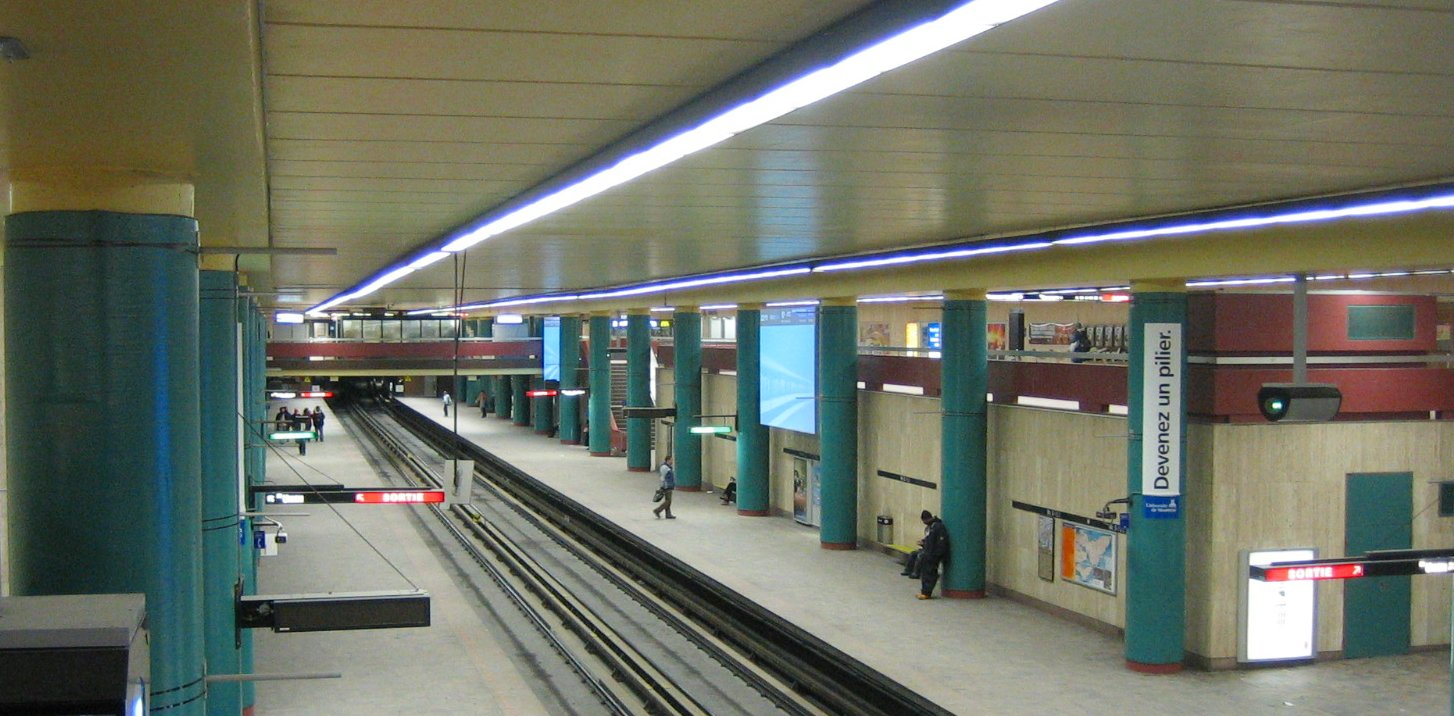
McGill Metro before renovations

- Centre Eaton/1501 McGill College (located on former site of Les Terrasses; includes former Complexe Les Ailes)
  - (access to Bonaventure Metro station via Place Ville-Marie/Gare Centrale)
- Place Montreal Trust
  - (access to Peel Metro station via Carrefour Industrielle-Alliance)
- Tour Industrielle-Vie
- 1801 McGill College Avenue building
- 2020 Robert-Bourassa
- Place London Life/Les Galeries 2001 University
- McGill University – 688 Sherbrooke building
- The Bay
- Le Parkade (2021 Union)
- Promenades Cathédrale/KPMG Tower

=== Lucien-L'Allier ===
- Centre Bell
  - (access to Bonaventure Metro station via Édifice Gare Windsor)
- Gare Lucien-L'Allier commuter train station: Vaudreuil–Hudson, Saint-Jérôme, and Candiac lines
- Windsor Station – former Canadian Pacific Railway headquarters

== Other downtown segments ==
=== Berri–UQAM ===
The hub of the Metro network located two Metro stations east of Place-des-Arts at the eastern edge of downtown is the transfer point for changing between the Green, Orange and Yellow lines.

- UQAM (Université du Québec à Montréal) buildings
  - Judith-Jasmin
  - Athanase-David
  - Design
  - Hubert-Aquin
  - Sciences de la gestion
  - J.-A. de Sèves
  - Centre Pierre-Péladeau
  - Thérèse-Casgrain
  - Paul-Gérin-Lajoie
- Grande Bibliothèque du Québec
- Gare d'autocars de Montréal
- Place Dupuis (shopping and office complex)
  - Hôtel des Gouverneurs

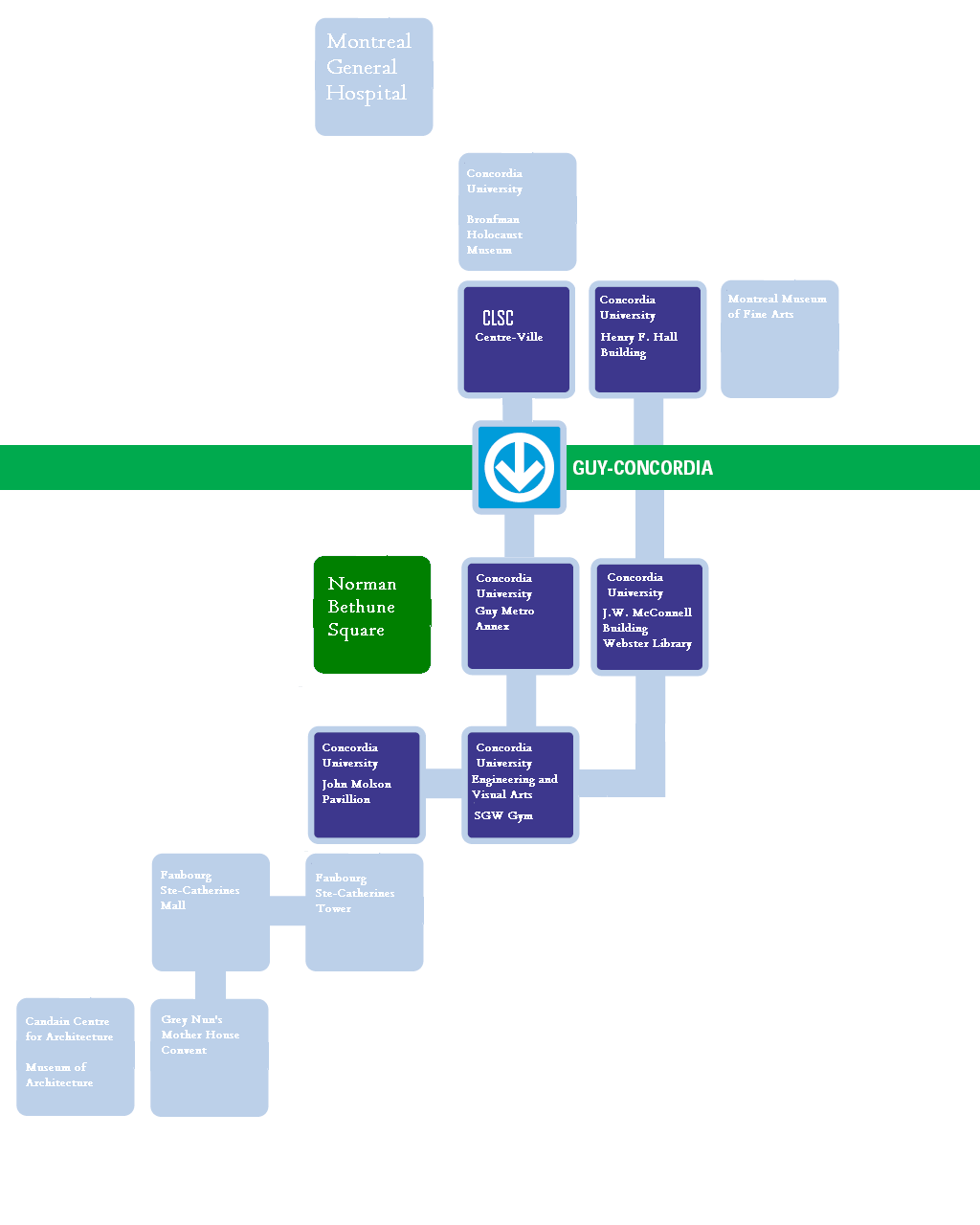
Guy-Concordia segment

=== Guy–Concordia ===
Located one Metro station west of Peel, this station is at the center of the Sir George Williams campus of Concordia University.

- Concordia University
  - Guy Metro Annex (GM) Building
  - Engineering, Computer Science and Visual Arts (EV) Complex
  - John Molson School of Business
  - J.W. McConnell (LB) Building
  - Henry F. Hall (H) Building

=== Atwater ===
One Metro station west of Guy–Concordia, this station is at the western edge of downtown and just inside the territory of Westmount.

- Place Alexis Nihon shopping, office and residential complexes
- Westmount Square shopping, office and residential complexes
- Dawson College, a major CEGEP

=== Champ-de-Mars ===
One metro station away from Place D’Armes, Champ-de-Mars is located right next to the new Centre hospitalier de l'Université de Montréal (CHUM). It is located near Montreal’s historic buildings and streets in Old Montreal as well as the Old Port.

- Centre hospitalier de l'Université de Montréal

== Other segments ==
=== Pie-IX ===
- Olympic Stadium
  - RIO (Régie des installations olympiques)
  - Regroupement Loisirs Québec

=== Jean-Talon ===
This station is the eastern transfer point between the Orange and Blue lines.

- Tour Jean-Talon

=== Université-de-Montréal ===
Situated on the Blue line in between Côte-des-Neiges and Édouard-Montpetit stations, this station serves the main campus of the university on the northwest slope of Mount-Royal. Although part of the campus has its own private network of underground tunnels including one opening next to the station, no part of the campus is directly connected to the Metro.

=== Édouard-Montpetit ===
Situated on the blue line between Université-de-Montréal and Outremont stations, this station serves many Université de Montréal buildings and is connected to the Réseau express métropolitain.

- CEPSUM (Centre d'éducation physique et des sports de l'Université de Montréal)

=== Vendôme ===
- McGill University Health Centre (Royal Victoria Hospital, Montreal Children's Hospital, Montreal Chest Institute, Cedars Cancer Centre, MUHC Research Institute)
- Shriners Hospital for Children – Canada
- Brunswick Medical Centre

=== Montmorency (off-island) ===
As the terminus of the Orange Line , this station is a major hub for bus transportation in Laval and the north shore.

- University of Montreal – Laval campus

=== Longueuil–Université-de-Sherbrooke (off island) ===
As the terminus of the Yellow Line , this station is a major hub for bus transportation on the south shore.

- Shopping, office, and residential complexes
- South shore bus terminal for RTL and exo lines
- Satellite campuses of the following universities:
  - Université de Sherbrooke
  - Université de Montréal
  - Université Laval

== Hotels ==
- Marriott Château Champlain—Bonaventure
- Hôtel Le Reine Elizabeth—Bonaventure
- Hôtel InterContinental—Square Victoria OACI
- Hôtel Le St. James—Square Victoria OACI
- Hôtel Doubletree by Hilton Montreal-Place-des-Arts
- Hôtel Place Dupuis - Ascent by Choice Hotels—Berri UQAM (previously Hôtel des Gouverneurs)
- Hôtel Bonaventure—Bonaventure (previously Hilton Bonaventure Montreal)
- W Hotel Montreal at Square Victoria—Square Victoria OACI
- Hôtel Le Westin Montreal—Square Victoria OACI

== Special events ==
Every February, Art Souterrain presents a journey through the central segment of the Underground City during the Montreal Highlights Festival, showing contemporary artistic projects.

== See also ==
- Underground city
- Edmonton Pedway
- Plus 15, a similar skywalk system in Calgary
- PATH (Toronto)
