= Pascal Grandmaison =

Canadian artist (born 1975)

Pascal Grandmaison (born 1975) is a Canadian artist known for his work in film, video, photography and sculpture. Grandmaison was born in Montreal, Quebec. His work is included in the collections of the Musée d'art contemporain de Montréal, the Musée national des beaux-arts du Québec, the Art Gallery of Ontario, and the National Gallery of Canada.
