= World Trade Centre Montreal =

Commercial complex in Quebec, Canada

- Centre de Commerce mondial de Montréal
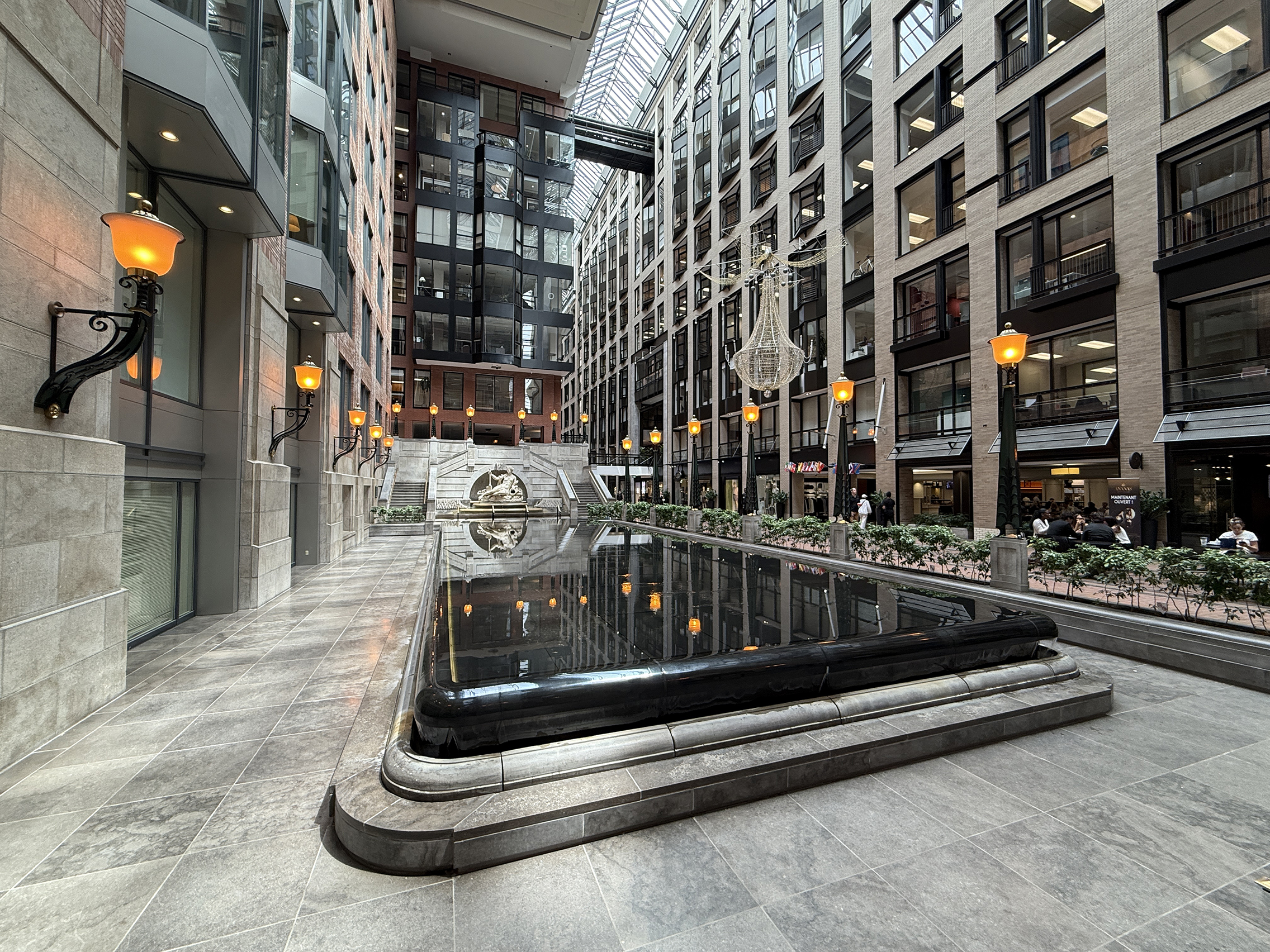
- Interior of the World Trade Centre

- Location within Montreal

General information
- Status: Completed
- Location: 747 Victoria Square, Montreal, Quebec, Canada
- Coordinates: 45°30′7.50″N 73°33′38.20″W
- Completed: 1992

Design and construction
- Architecture firm: Arcop

Website
- www.centredecommercemondial.com

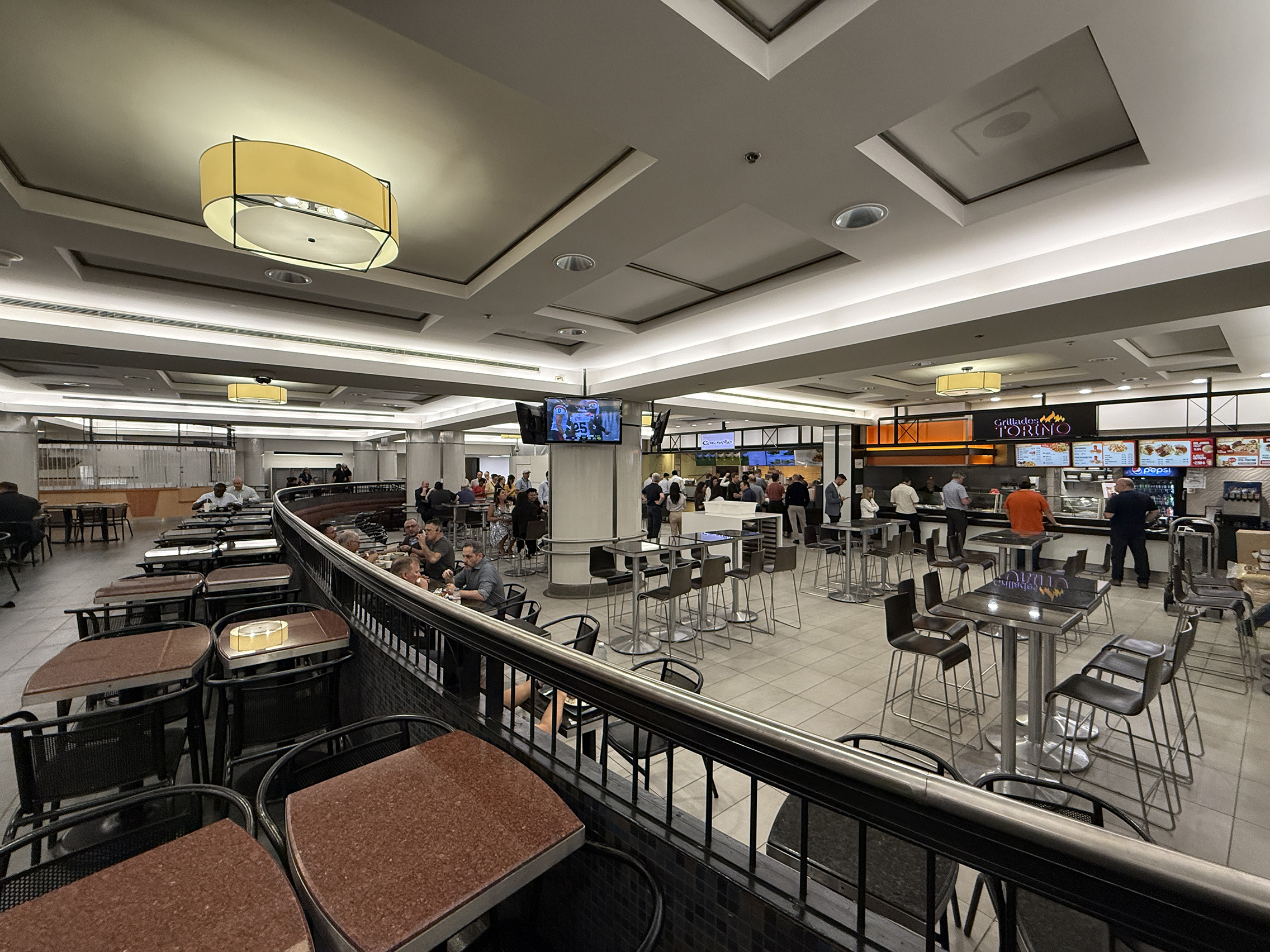
Food Court

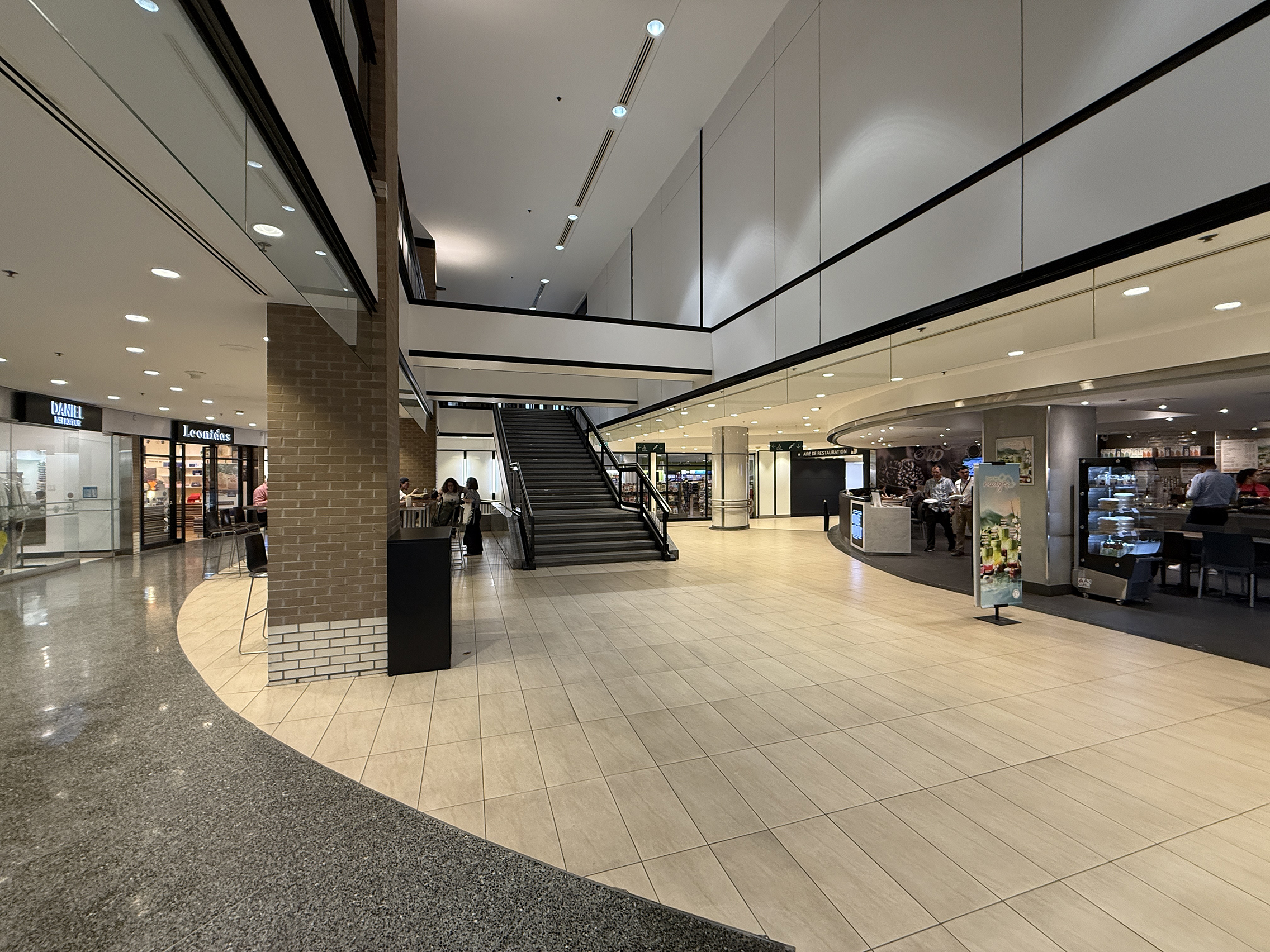
Shopping Arcade

The World Trade Centre Montreal (in French, Centre de Commerce mondial de Montréal) is a shopping centre, office and hotel complex located in the Quartier international district of Montreal, Quebec, Canada.

Completed in 1992 by Arcop, it is an example of a 'horizontal skyscraper' and a leading example of urban renewal, architectural preservation and rehabilitation. The complex united several smaller Victorian-era commercial buildings (including the city's historic Bank of Nova Scotia building and Canada Steamship Lines building) by encasing them in a larger form, in this case a massive glassed-in atrium running the length of what was once Fortification Lane, itself the site of the city's colonial defensive walls. In a kind of post-modern hommage, a remnant of the Berlin Wall, given to the city in 1992, is on public exhibit within the complex. The complex includes other historic elements, such as a fountain by French architect and sculptor Dieudonné-Barthélemy Guibal (1699–1757) also donated to the city in 1992. At the far end of the centre is the Montreal InterContinental Hotel.

From the exterior it appears as a late-19th century Montreal business block with a diverse collection of buildings in different styles. Once inside the rear sections of those buildings have been oriented on to a vast open space, replete with reflecting pool, cafés, boutiques and other diverse services. The interior is united in its open volume and natural lighting.

The centre is connected to Montreal's underground city and to Square-Victoria-OACI metro station towards the West and Place d'Armes and Place Riopelle to the East.
