= Complexe Desjardins =

Mixed use office, hotel, and shopping mall complex located in Montreal, Quebec

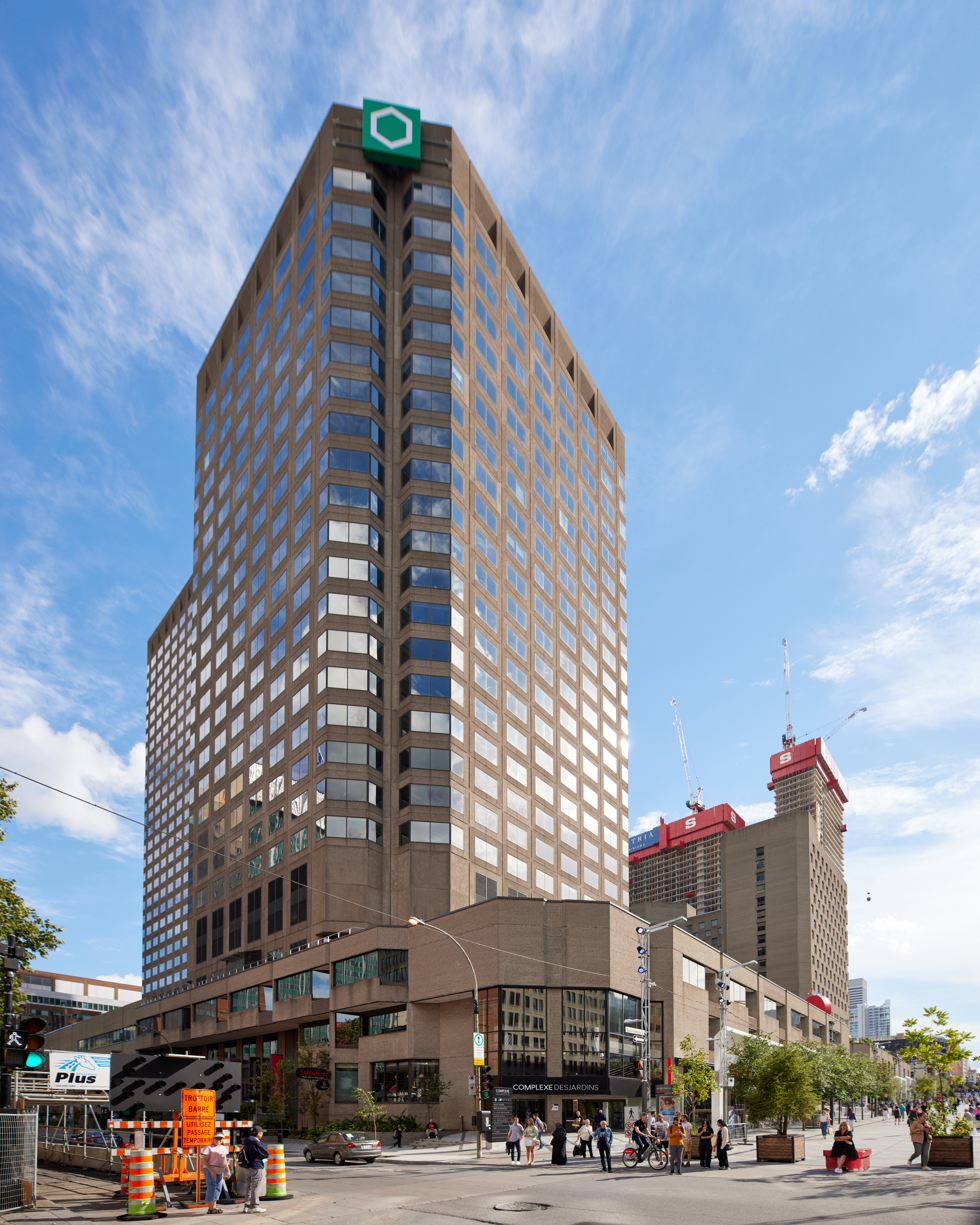
- North tower and entrance to mall
- Interactive map of the Complexe Desjardins area

General information
- Type: Office
- Architectural style: Modern
- Location: Montreal, Quebec, Canada, 150 Saint Catherine Street west
- Coordinates: 45.5075°N 73.5644°W
- Completed: 1975

Height
- Roof: 152 m (499 ft)

Technical details
- Floor count: 111 (12/27/32/40)
- Floor area: 418,154 m2
- Lifts/elevators: Ascenseurs Design Inc. Les ascenseurs Labadie Inc. (Original); Montenay Service D'Ascenseurs M.S.A. Inc. Montgomery (Original); Thyssen (1996)

Design and construction
- Architect: Darling, Pearson and Cleveland

Website
- www.complexedesjardins.com/en/

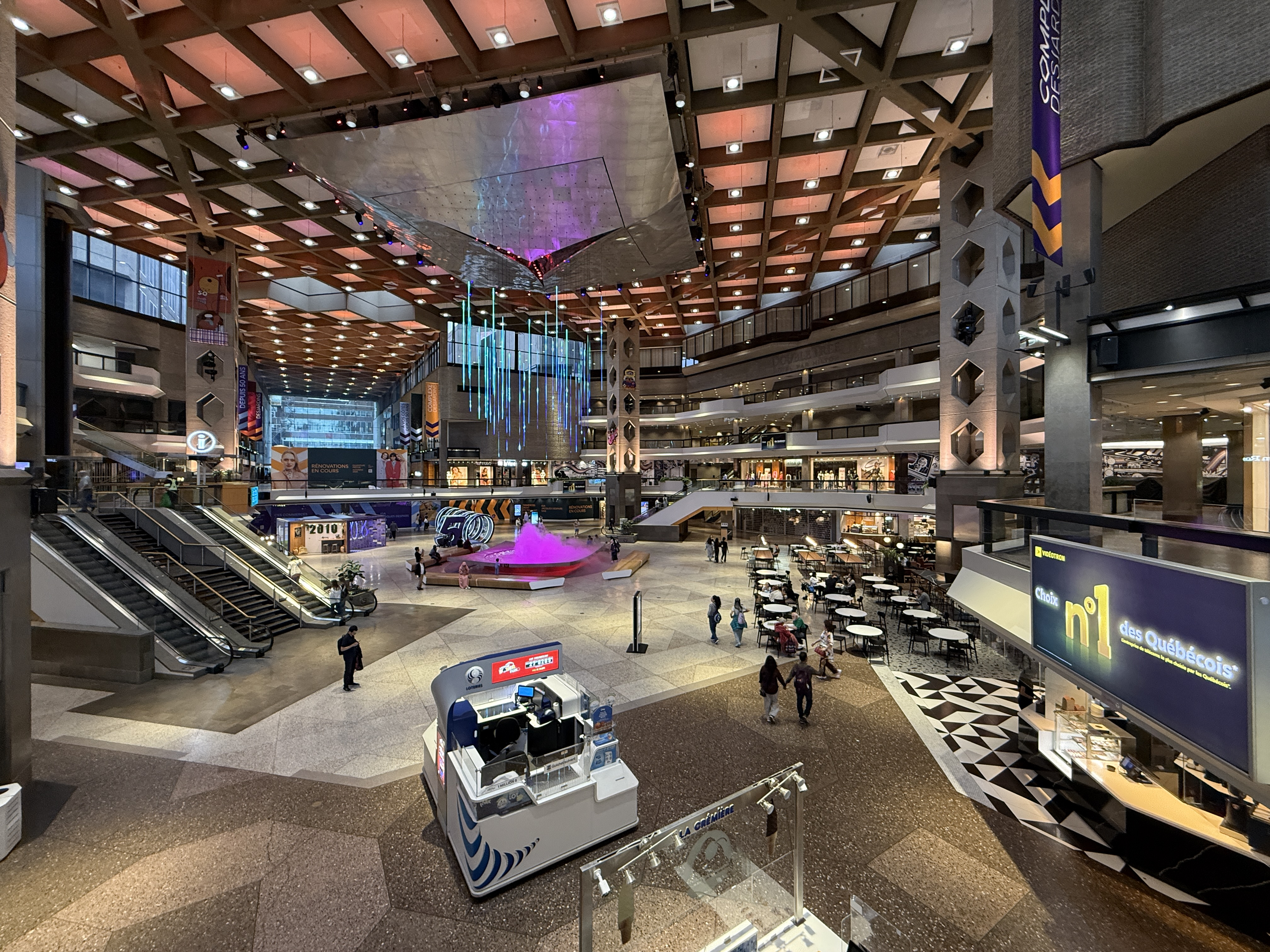
Atrium in 2026

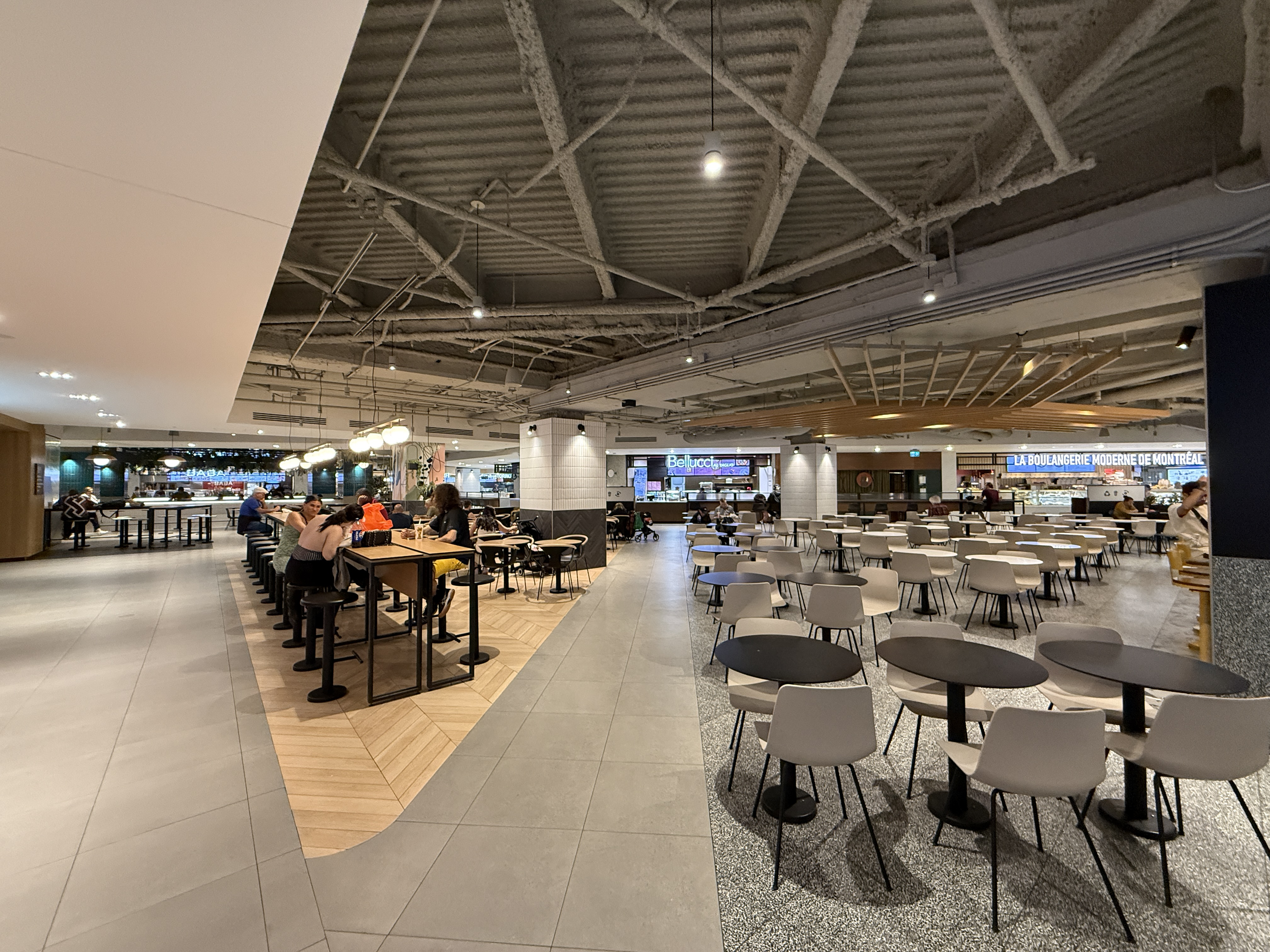
Food Court in Level 2

Complexe Desjardins is a mixed-use office, hotel, and shopping mall complex located in Montreal, Quebec, Canada, in the Quartier des spectacles area of Saint Catherine Street. The project was designed to develop the eastern end of downtown Montreal, it is located in the quadrilateral formed by Saint Catherine, Saint-Urbain, Jeanne Mance and René Lévesque Boulevard.

Its architectural design consists of four towers of varying heights (40, 32, 27 and 20 floors), three of which house offices of the Desjardins Group, Quebec Government offices and other companies, whilst the smallest tower is a hotel, all linked together by a six storey atrium shopping centre anchored by IGA. This design produces the effect of an indoor square. It is one of very few buildings in Canada to have its own postal code prefix, H5B.

The Complexe Desjardins is connected by the underground city to Place des Arts and the Place-des-Arts Metro station to the north, and the Complexe Guy-Favreau, the Palais des congrès de Montréal, and Place-d'Armes Metro station to the south.

The hotel in the complex opened as the Hotel Meridien Montreal in April 1976. It was later renamed the Wyndham Montreal, then the Hyatt Regency Montreal in 2003, then the DoubleTree by Hilton Montreal in December 2018.

On July 26, 1992, a man, whose body is still unidentified to this day, fell to his death fifty feet from the Complexe Desjardins.

The mall is briefly featured in the 1988 film Tommy Tricker and the Stamp Traveller, in a scene where then fourteen-year-old Rufus Wainwright performs the film's theme song, "I'm Running", while the film's protagonists engage in a chase sequence.

== Structures ==
Name	Height	Floors	Year	Notes
Tour Nord (North Tower)	108 m (354 ft)	27 floors	1975	
Tour Sud (South Tower)	152 m (499 ft)	40 floors	1975	
Tour Est (East Tower)	130 m (430 ft)	32 floors	1975	
DoubleTree by Hilton Montreal	ca. 60 m (200 ft)	12 floors	1975	

== Monument à Alphonse Desjardins ==
Yves Trudeau's Monument à Alphonse Desjardins was located outside at the corner of St. Urbain and St. Catherine from 1976 to 1995 but since relocated to Parc Catchpaw, in Orford, Quebec.

== Gallery ==
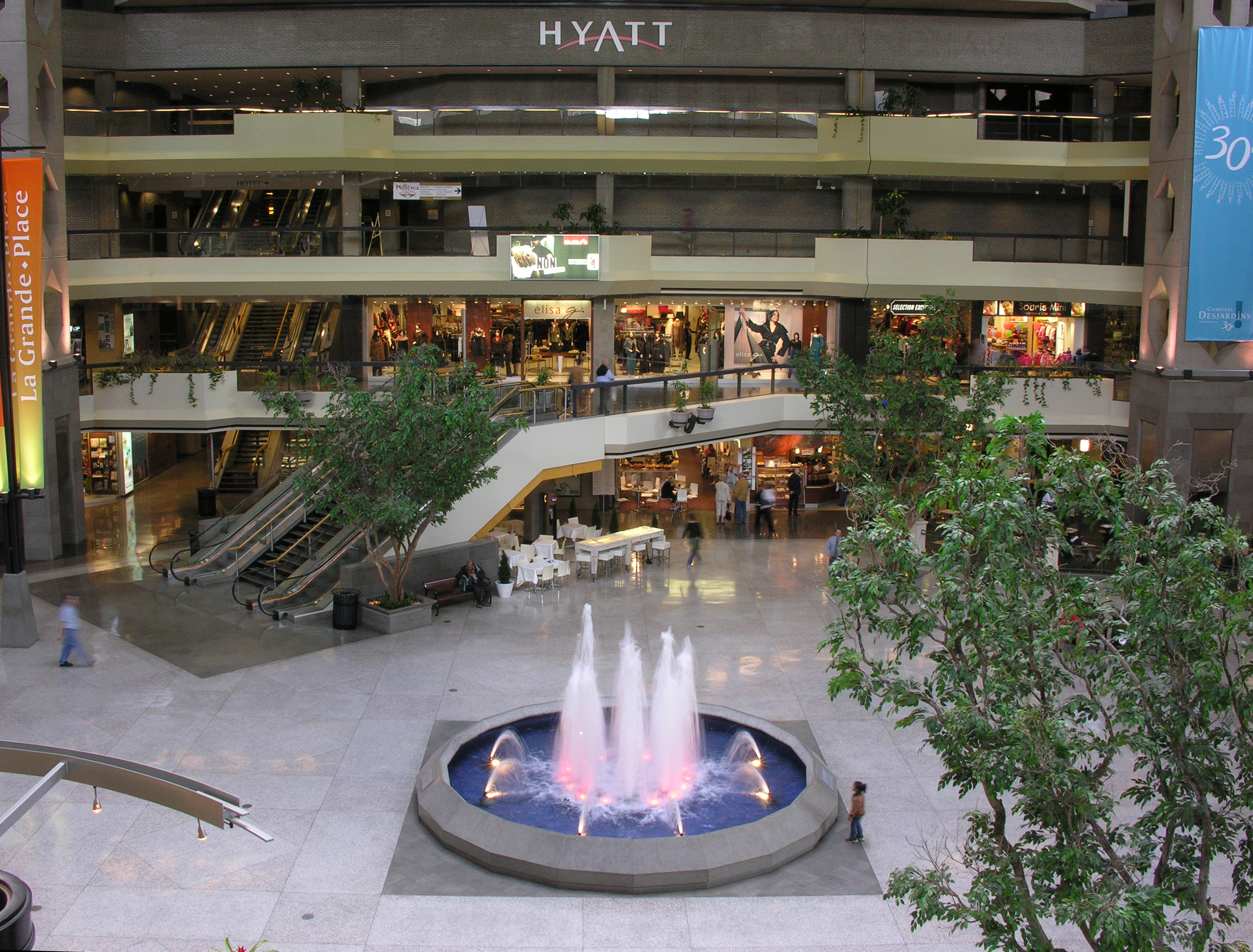
Atrium before renovation (2006)

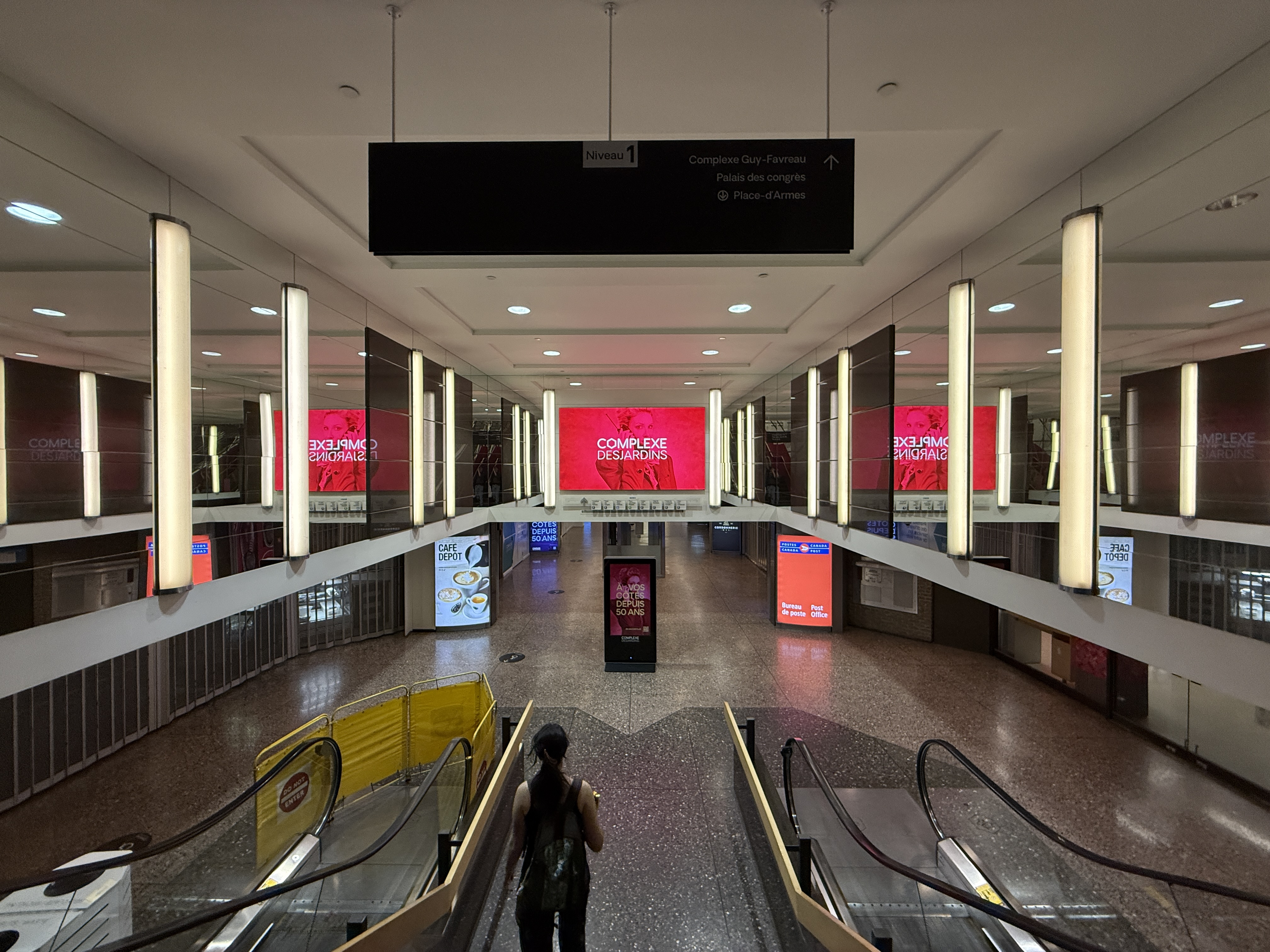
Level 1

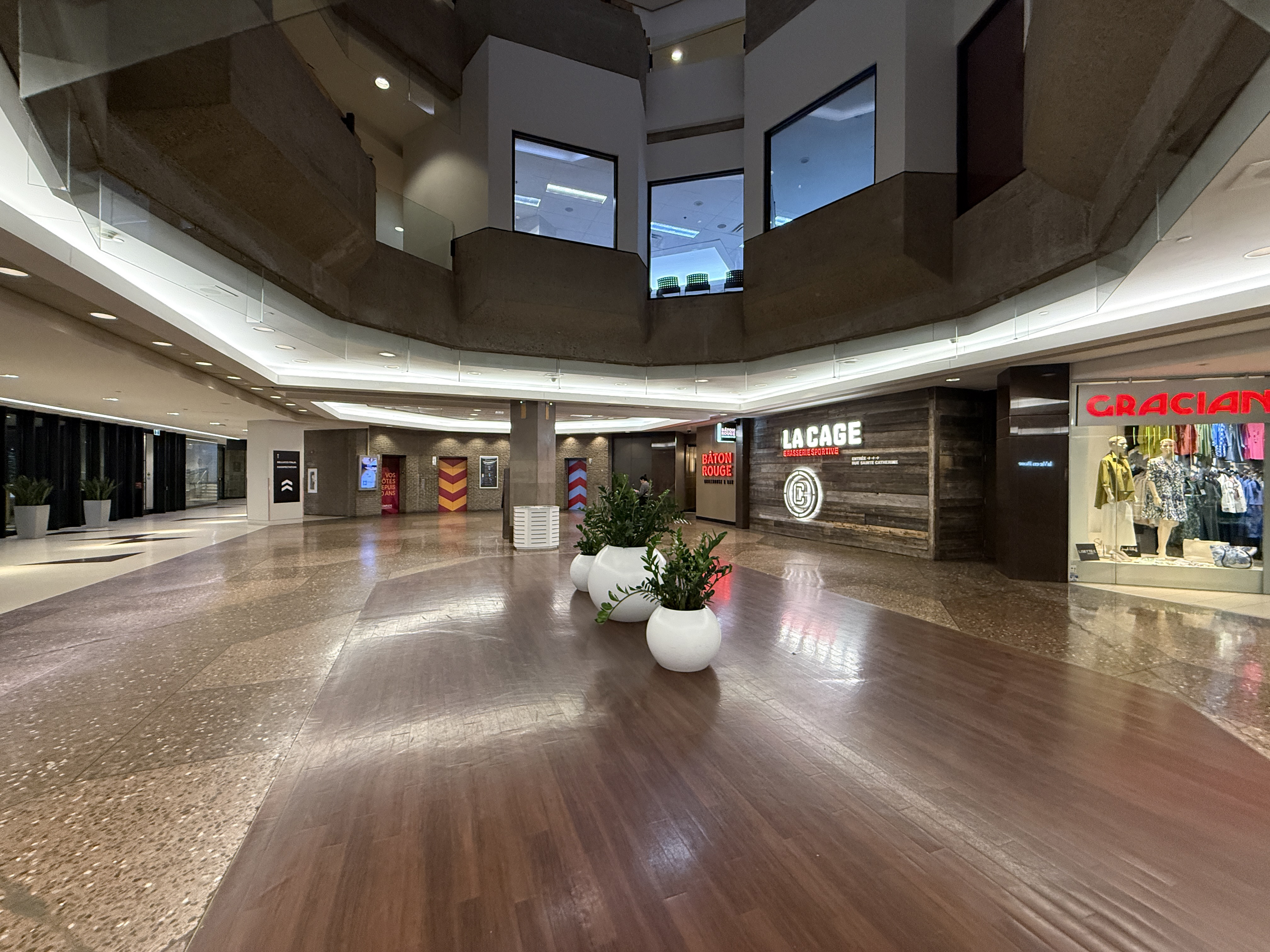
Level 3

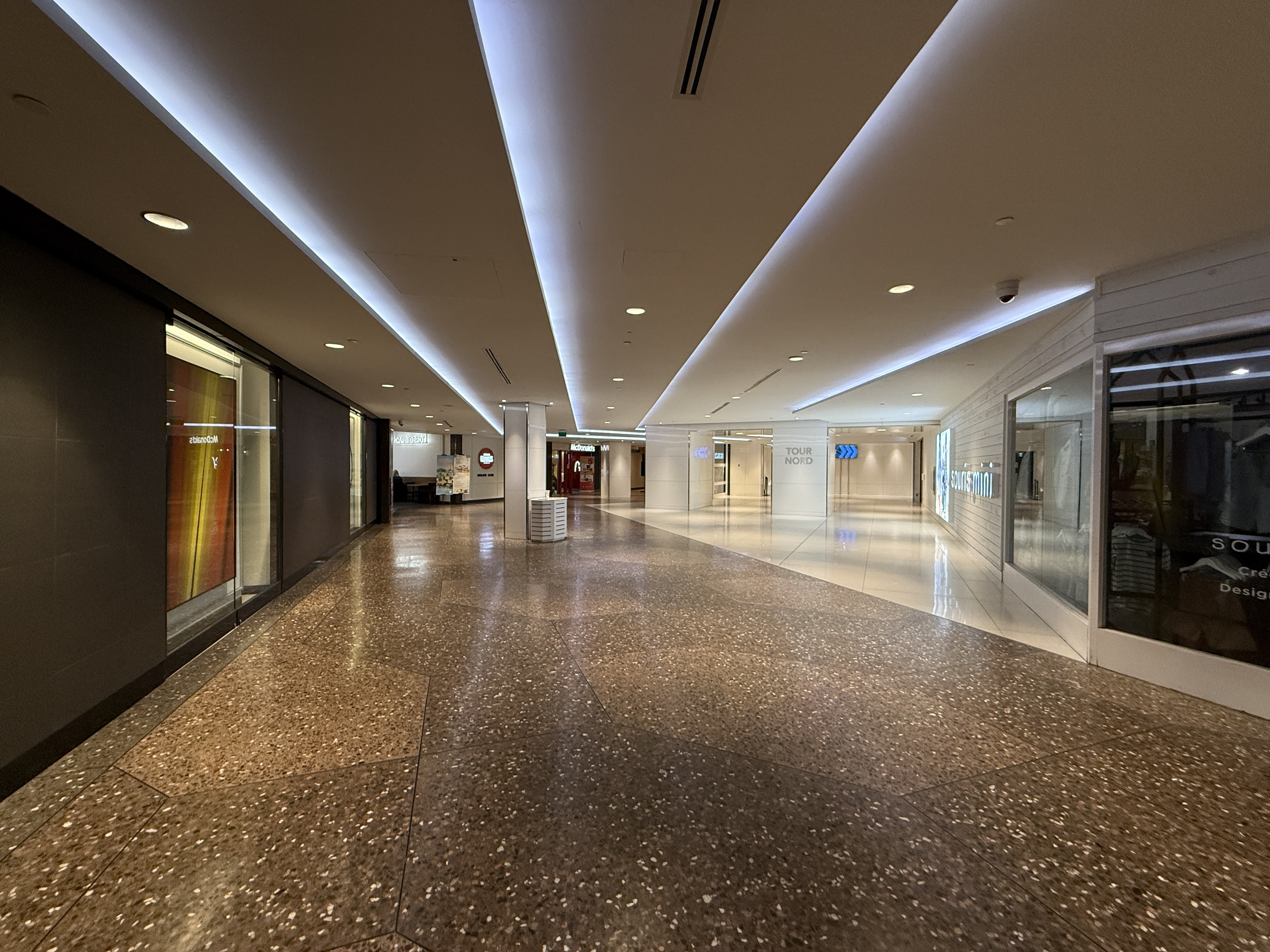
Tour Nord lobby

== See also ==
- List of shopping malls in Montreal
- List of tallest buildings in Montreal
