= Complexe Guy-Favreau =

Building complex in Montreal, Quebec, Canada

Coordinates: 45°30′23″N 73°33′44″W

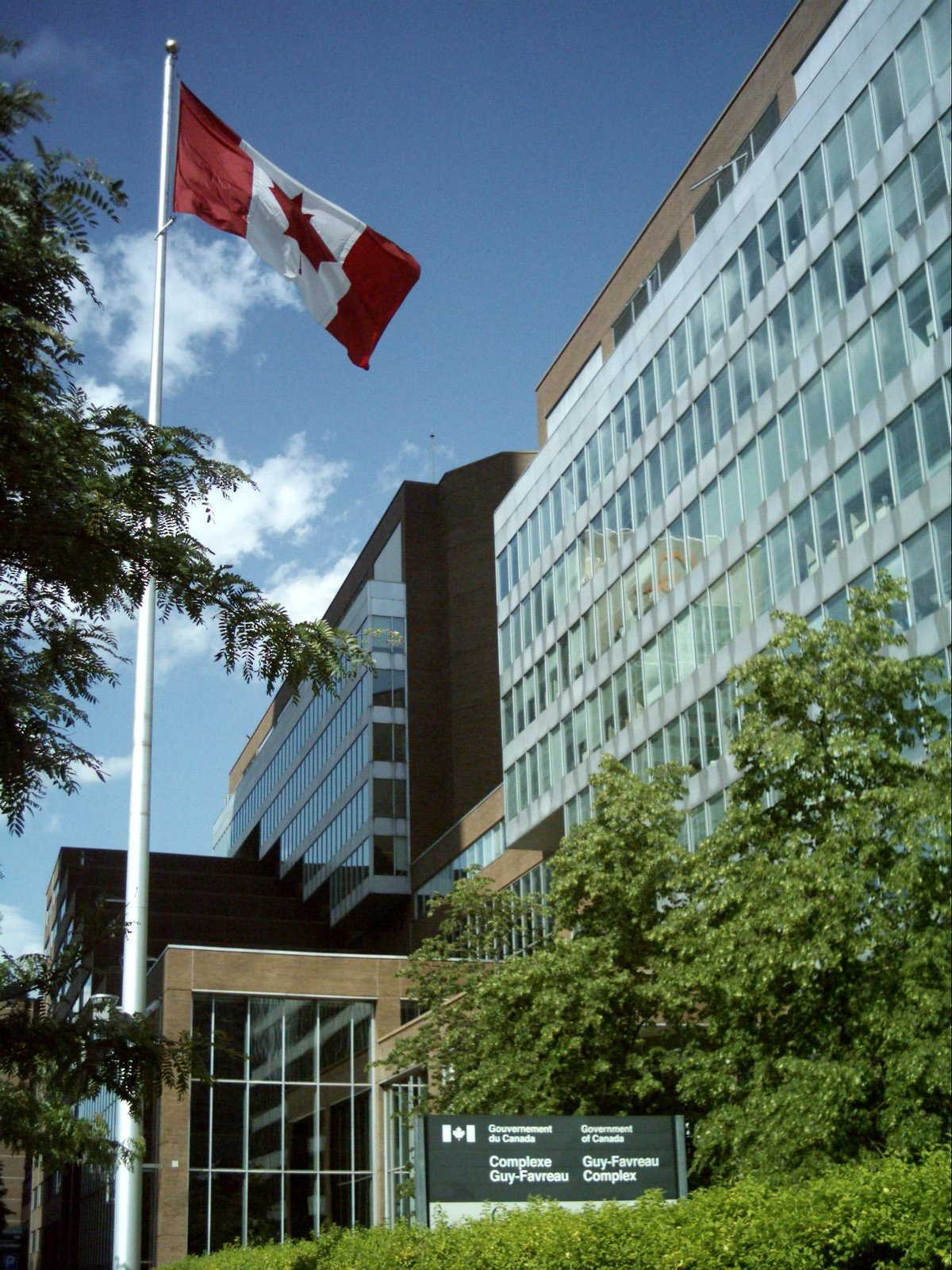
Complexe Guy-Favreau seen from René Lévesque Boulevard

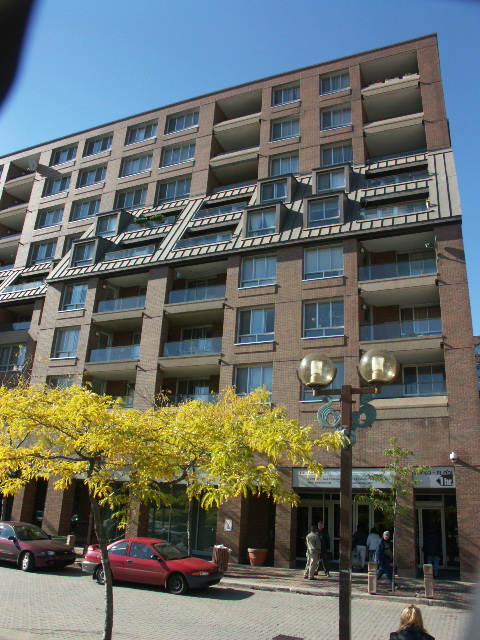
"Les habitations du centre-ville", the southern residential section of the building complex on De la Gauchetière Street

Complexe Guy-Favreau is a twelve-storey building complex containing Canadian government offices built in 1984. It is located at 200 René Lévesque Boulevard in Ville-Marie, Montréal and extends over a six-acre plot of land, formerly part of the Montreal Chinatown. The complex is named after Guy Favreau, a former MP, federal cabinet minister and briefly Quebec Superior Court Justice.

The building complex came about as a joint venture between the federal government, which served as the head of the project, as well as private businesses, the City of Montreal, and the Desjardins Group. The multifunctional complex is part of the Montreal underground city network and contains various Canadian governmental offices, rental properties, a housing cooperative, commercial units, a daycare facility, and a small park at its centre.

== See also ==
- Complexe Desjardins
- Chinatown, Montreal
