= Medical Arts Building =

Medical Arts Building may refer to:

== Canada ==
- Medical Arts Building (Montreal)

== United States ==
(by state then city/town)

- Medical Arts Building (Hot Springs, Arkansas), listed on the National Register of Historic Places (NRHP)
- Medical Arts Building (Atlanta, Georgia), NRHP-listed
- Medical Arts Building (Grand Rapids, Michigan), listed on the NRHP in Kent County, Michigan
- Medical Arts Building (Oak Park, Illinois)
- Medical Arts Building (Oklahoma City, Oklahoma), listed on the NRHP in Oklahoma County
- Medical Arts Building (Portland, Oregon), NRHP-listed
- Medical Arts Building (Pittsburgh, Pennsylvania) at the University of Pittsburgh Medical Center
- Medical Arts Building (Reading, Pennsylvania)
- Medical Arts Building (Chattanooga, Tennessee), listed on the NRHP in Hamilton County, Tennessee
- Medical Arts Building (Knoxville, Tennessee), NRHP-listed
- Medical Arts Building (St. George, Staten Island, New York)
- Medical Arts Building and Garage, Memphis, Tennessee, listed on the NRHP in Shelby County, Tennessee
- Medical Arts Building (Fort Worth, Texas), one of the former tallest buildings in Fort Worth
- Medical Arts Building (Galveston, Texas), a 1929-built contemporary of City National Bank (Galveston, Texas)
- Medical Arts Building (San Antonio), also known as "Old Medical Arts Building", a contributing building in the Alamo Plaza Historic District
- Medical Arts Building (Newport News, Virginia), NRHP-listed
- Rhodes Medical Arts Building (Tacoma, Washington), listed on the NRHP in Pierce County, Washington

== See also ==
- Doctors Building (disambiguation)
