= Architects' Building (Montreal) =

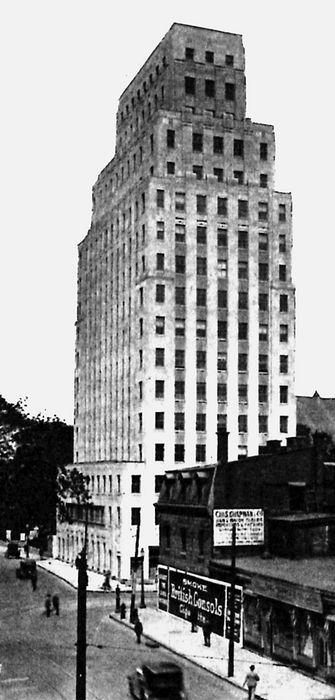
- Ross and Macdonald, Architects' Building, 1931
- Interactive map of the Architects' Building area

General information
- Type: Office building
- Architectural style: Art Deco
- Location: 1135 Beaver Hall Hill, Montreal, Quebec, Canada
- Coordinates: 45.5031°N 73.5660°W
- Construction started: 1930
- Construction stopped: 1931
- Demolished: 1968

Height
- Height: 69.82 m (229.1 ft)

Technical details
- Floor count: 17

Design and construction
- Architecture firm: Ross and Macdonald

The Architects' Building was an office building located in Montreal, Quebec, Canada. It was located at 1135 Beaver Hall Hill, on the southeast corner of Dorchester Boulevard (now René Lévesque Boulevard) in Downtown Montreal.

It was designed by Montreal architecture firm Ross and Macdonald, and was constructed between 1930 and 1931. It stood 17 stories tall, equivalent to 69.82 m in height. Its architectural style was considered to be Art Deco. The Architects' Building was designed shortly after the same firm's celebrated Édifice Price in Quebec City and showed similarities in its style and massing. As the building's name suggests, Ross and Macdonald did in fact locate their own offices on the 13th floor of the building from its 1931 opening until about 1934.

Canadian Industries Limited (CIL) first leased space in the building in 1934 and shortly afterwards became the principal occupant. Around 1936, the building was renamed CIL House – not to be confused with the later building which also bore the same name. At the time, CIL was jointly owned by Imperial Chemical Industries (ICI) and DuPont. A U.S. antitrust settlement in 1954 required the termination of all joint ventures between the two companies. CIL was split; the ICI-owned part retained the CIL name but moved to new headquarters. The remainder, named DuPont Canada, remained in the old building (now the DuPont Building) until 1967.

The building was demolished in 1968.
