= Le Château Apartments =

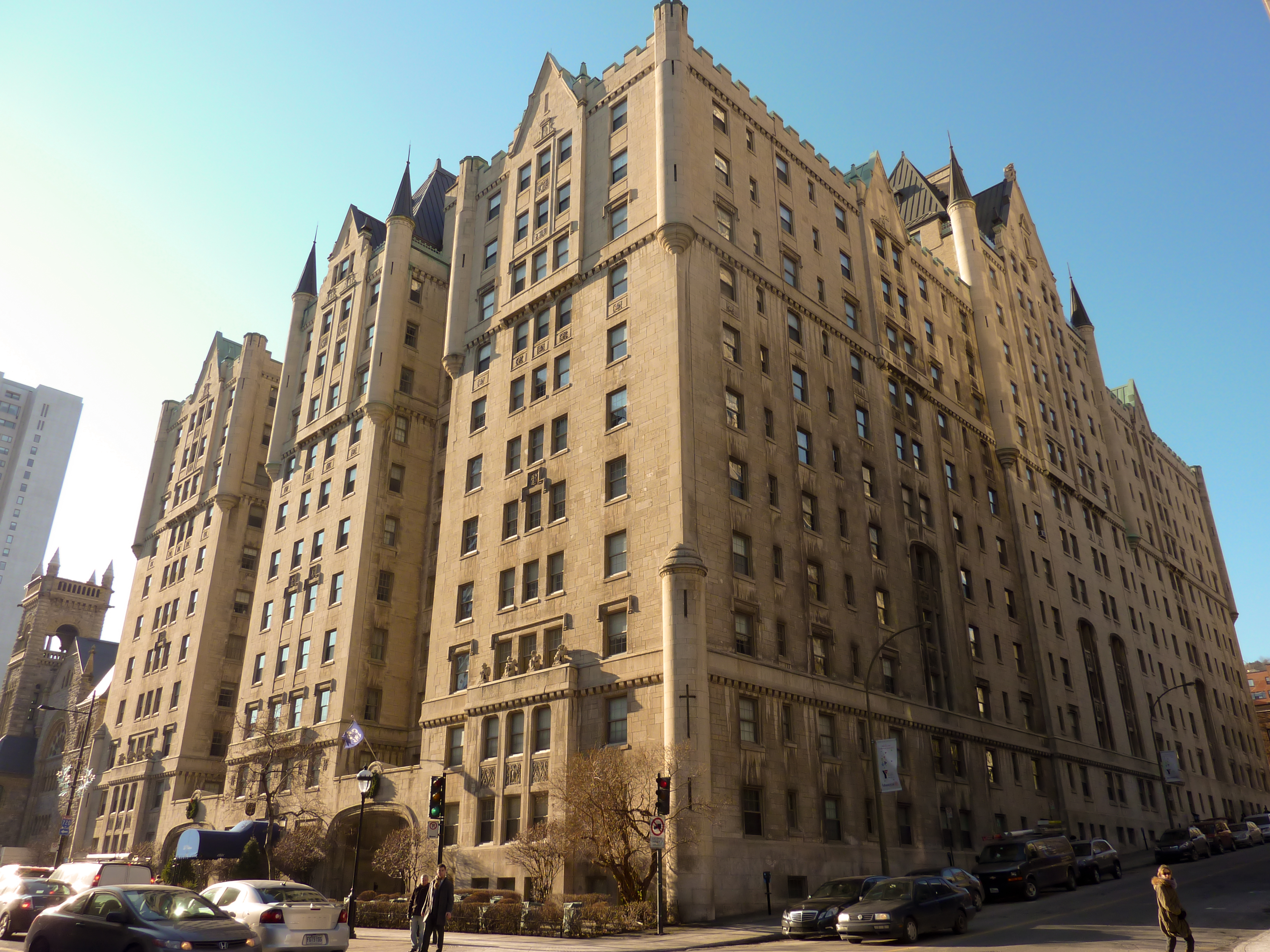
- Interactive map of the Le Château Apartments area

General information
- Type: Apartments
- Architectural style: Châteauesque, Scottish Baronial
- Location: 1321, rue Sherbrooke Ouest; Montreal, Quebec; H3G 1J4
- Coordinates: 45.499479°N 73.579321°W
- Construction started: 1924
- Completed: 1925

Dimensions
- Other dimensions: Grounds: 6,279 m^{2}

Technical details
- Floor count: 11
- Floor area: 29,973 m^{2}
- Lifts/elevators: Otis-Fensom Elevator Company Limited

Design and construction
- Architect: Ross and Macdonald

Le Château Apartments is an apartment building in Montreal, Quebec, Canada. It is located at 1321 Sherbrooke Street West in the Golden Square Mile neighbourhood of Downtown Montreal.

The building was commissioned by Pamphile Réal Du Tremblay the owner of La Presse newspaper at the time. It was constructed between November 1924 and 1925, and was designed by Montreal architecture firm Ross and Macdonald. Its facade is Tyndall limestone from Manitoba and its structural material is steel. It ranges from 12 to 14 stories tall. There are 136 apartments.

The building is home to many famous residents, including at one time author Mordecai Richler for more than 20 years.

== Architecture ==
Le Château Apartments were designed to resemble both French châteaux and Scottish fortified houses. The roof of the building is copper, which is commonly found in Canada's grand railway hotels. The facade of the building is mostly Tyndall limestone from Garson, Manitoba, and contains fossils dating from before the last ice age when much of southern Manitoba was covered by a vast sea. Most of the architectural details are in Indiana Limestone.
