= Medical Arts Building (Montreal) =

Coordinates: 45°29′47″N 73°34′52″W

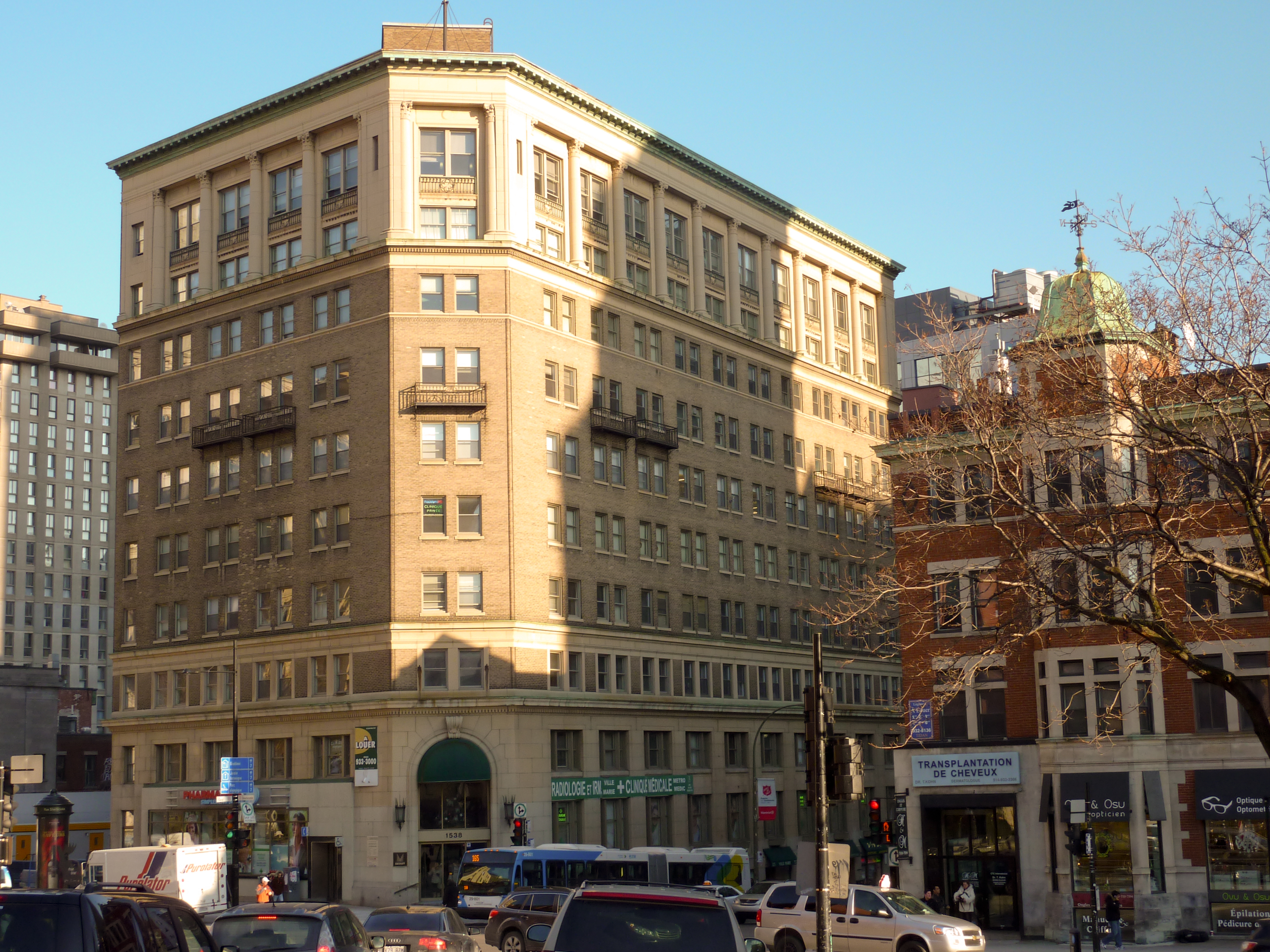

General information
- Type: Medical Offices
- Location: 1538 Sherbrooke Street West, Montreal, Quebec, Canada
- Completed: 1922

Height
- Roof: 45.17 metres (148.2 ft)

Technical details
- Floor count: 11
- Floor area: 100,000 square feet (9,300 m^{2})
- Lifts/elevators: 2 passenger, 1 freight

Design and construction
- Architect: Ross and Macdonald

The Medical Arts Building (French: Édifice Medical Arts) is an office building in Montreal, Quebec, Canada. Its address is 1538 Sherbrooke Street West at the corner of Guy Street in the Golden Square Mile neighbourhood of Downtown Montreal. It is 11 stories and 45.17 m tall.

It was designed by Montreal architects Ross and Macdonald and is considered to be Renaissance Revival architecture. It was completed in 1922. Its structure is steel and its facade is mostly brick, with limestone at the base as well as the upper floors of the building.

The building was acquired by a joint venture. Operating under a Value-Add strategy, the ownership group initiated a series of heritage-compliant CapEx projects to modernize the infrastructure while preserving the original architectural design. This included an exterior restoration project to refurbish the facade and install architectural lighting.

The building's Tenant Mix is exclusively anchored by specialized healthcare clinics and medical practitioners. The ownership group, alongside the new tenant, allocated funding to complete a custom build-out of a floor to accommodate the arrival of the clinic.
