= Doctors Building =

Doctors Building, Doctor's Building, or Doctors' Building may refer to:

- Doctor's Building (Nashville, Tennessee), a six-story commercial building
- Doctors' Building (Cincinnati, Ohio), a historic commercial structure
- W. W. Orr Building in Atlanta, Georgia; also known as the W. W. Orr Doctors' Building

== See also ==
- Medical Arts Building (disambiguation)
