= George Allen Ross =

Canadian architect

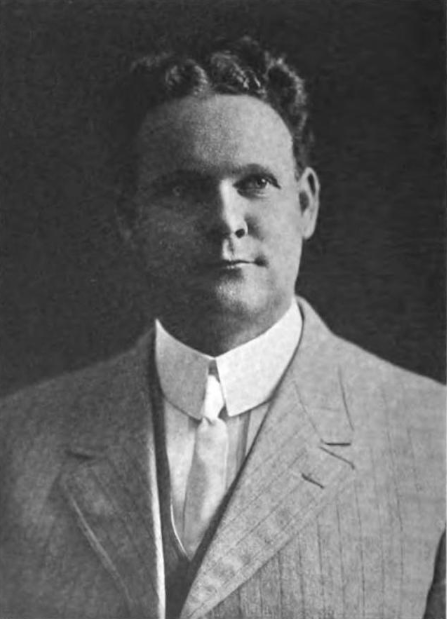
- Born: October 24, 1878; Montreal, Quebec
- Died: January 21, 1946 (aged 67); Montreal, Quebec
- Resting place: Mount Royal Cemetery
- Education: High School of Montreal; Massachusetts Institute of Technology; École des Beaux-Arts
- Occupation: Architect

George Allen Ross (October 24, 1878 – January 21, 1946) was a Canadian architect, for many years senior partner in the important Montreal firm of Ross and Macdonald.

== Life ==
Born in Montreal on October 24, 1878, Ross was educated at the High School of Montreal, the Massachusetts Institute of Technology in Cambridge, Massachusetts, and the École des Beaux-Arts in Paris.

After returning from Paris, Ross was apprenticed to Brown, MacVicar, & Heriot in Montreal and later become a draftsman for the Grand Trunk Railway. He also worked for Parker & Thomas in Boston and Carrere & Hastings in New York City, then in 1907 went into partnership in Montreal with David MacFarlane as Ross and MacFarlane. When MacFarlane withdrew from the firm in 1912, Ross established a new partnership with Robert Henry Macdonald called Ross and Macdonald.

He died at his home in Montreal on January 21, 1946.

== Honours ==
- Fellow of the Royal Architectural Institute of Canada
- Associate of the Royal Institute of British Architects, 1904
- Fellow of the Royal Institute of British Architects, 1913
- President of the Quebec Association of Architects
