= Ross and Macdonald =

Canadian architectural firm

Practice information
- Key architects: George Allen Ross; Robert Henry Macdonald
- Founded: 1907 (as Ross and MacFarlane)
- Location: Montreal, Quebec, Canada

Significant works and honors
- Buildings: Château Laurier; Fort Garry Hotel; Royal York Hotel; Maple Leaf Gardens

Ross and Macdonald was one of Canada's most notable architecture firms in the early 20th century. Based in Montreal, Quebec, the firm originally operated as a partnership between George Allen Ross and David MacFarlane (known as Ross and MacFarlane) from 1907 to 1912. MacFarlane withdrew from the firm in 1912, and Robert Henry Macdonald became a partner.

The Ross and Macdonald name was used until 1944, after which it became Ross & Ross, Architects, when John Kenneth Ross joined his father as partner. Following George Allen Ross's death in 1946, the firm continued as Ross, Patterson, Townsend & Heughan. By 1970, the firm was known as Ross, Fish, Duschenes & Barrett. Since 2006, it has operated as DFS Inc. Architecture & Design.

== George Allen Ross ==
Ross (1879–1946) was born in Montreal, and later studied at the High School of Montreal, the Massachusetts Institute of Technology in Cambridge, Massachusetts, and the École des Beaux-Arts in Paris.

Ross was apprenticed to Brown, MacVicar & Heriot in Montreal, and later become a draftsman for the Grand Trunk Railway. He also did work with Parker & Thomas in Boston and Carrere & Hastings in New York before partnering with MacFarlane in Montreal.

He was a Fellow of the Royal Architectural Institute of Canada. He was also a member of the Royal Institute of British Architects, becoming an Associate in 1904 and a Fellow in 1913.

== Robert Henry Macdonald ==
Macdonald (1875–1942) was born in Melbourne, Australia. He articled to Richard B. Whitaker, M.S.A. of Melbourne, and became a junior draftsman to Robert Findlay in Montreal in 1895. After positions as a draftsman for George B. Post starting in 1903, a senior draftsman with Crighton & McKay in Wellington, New Zealand in 1905, and head draftsman with W.W. Bosworth in New York in 1906, Macdonald joined Ross and MacFarlane in Montreal as a junior partner and draftsman in 1907. He ultimately became a partner of the firm in 1912.

He was a Fellow of the Royal Architectural Institute of Canada and of the Royal Institute of British Architects. He served as president of the Quebec Association of Architects in 1939, and was a recipient of the association's Award of Merit.

== Important works ==
Name of Building	Type	Location	Construction period	Image	Notes
Bank of Toronto branch	Commercial	Guy St. and St. Catherine St. W.), Montreal	1908		As Ross and MacFarlene.
Complexe Les Ailes	Commercial	Montreal	1925-27		Former Eaton's department store.
Saskatoon Board of Education offices	Commercial	Saskatoon	1928-29		Former Eaton's department store.
Former Eaton's Store	Commercial	Calgary	1928-29		Main structure demolished 1988, partial façade incorporated into Calgary Eaton Centre.
Dominion Square Building	Commercial	Montreal	1928–1930		
College Park, Toronto	Commercial	Toronto	1928-30		Former Eaton's department store - with Sproatt and Rolph.
Holt Renfrew Montreal	Commercials	1300 Sherbrooke Street West, Montreal	1937		Holt Renfrew closed in 2020, moved with nearby Ogilvy's store on St.Catherine Street. Building converted as residential building called Le Château Apartments.
Château Laurier Hotel	Hotel	Ottawa	1909-12		As Ross and MacFarlene with Bradford Lee Gilbert.
Lord Elgin Hotel	Hotel	Ottawa	1940–41		
Royal York Hotel	Hotel	Toronto	1927-29		With Sproatt and Rolph
Fort Garry Hotel	Hotel	Winnipeg	1910–14		As Ross and MacFarlene.
Hotel Saskatchewan	Hotel	Regina	1926–27		Used beams from the incomplete Chateau Qu'Appelle also designed by Ross and Macdonald.
Hotel Macdonald	Hotel	Edmonton	1912–14		As Ross and MacFarlene.
Les Cours Mont-Royal	Hotel	Montreal	1920-24		(Former Sheraton Mount Royal Hotel, now a shopping mall, condo and office complex)
Senate of Canada Building	Public building	Ottawa	1911-1912		As Ross and MacFarlene designed building, formerly as Ottawa Union Station and later as Government Conference Centre. Now as temporary home of Senate.
Union Station	Public building	Toronto	1914-1920		With Hugh G. Jones, John Lyle
Architects' Building	Office building	Montreal	1929-34		demolished
Confederation Building (McGill College Ave. and St. Catherine St. W.)	Office building	Montreal	1927–28		
Castle Building (Stanley Street and St. Catherine St. W.)	Office building	Montreal	1924–27		
Dominion Square Building (Peel Street and St. Catherine St. W.)	Office building	Montreal	1928–40		
Montreal Star Building (St. Jacques St.)	Office building	Montreal	1926–31		
Royal Bank Building (Yonge Street and King Street East)	Office building	Toronto	1913–15		
Édifice Price (Sainte-Anne street)	Office building	Quebec City	1929–1930		
Medical Arts Building	Office building	Montreal	1922		
Le Chateau Apartments, (Sherbrooke and De La Montagne)	Residential	Montreal	1926		
The Gleneagles, (Cote des Neiges Road)	Residential	Montreal	1929		
Central Technical School	High School	Toronto	1915		
The Hydrostone	Commercial	Halifax	1918		
Maple Leaf Gardens	Hockey arena	Toronto	1931–32		
