= Castle Building =

Office building in Montreal, Quebec

Coordinates: 45.4993°N 73.5740°W

The Castle Building is home to Victoria's Secret Downtown Montreal Flagship Location

The Castle Building is a retail and office building in Montreal, Quebec, Canada. Its office address is 1410 Stanley Street on the corner of Saint Catherine Street West in Downtown Montreal. It is owned and operated by Gold Castle Holdings Limited. The building has had heavy investment including modern elevators, HVAC, rooftop terrace, and more. The building is now home to Victoria's Secret largest retail store in Canada.

Named for the Castle Tea Company and erected on the site of the former Emmanuel Congregational Church, it was designed by Montreal architecture firm Ross and Macdonald, and was completed in 1927. It has 11 floors. The building's facade material is brick and its facade system is applied masonry. Its architectural style is Neoclassical.

The Castle Building was awarded the Heritage Emeritus Award in 2005 by the City of Montreal and Heritage Montreal.

Lobby of the Castle Building
