= Linton Apartments =

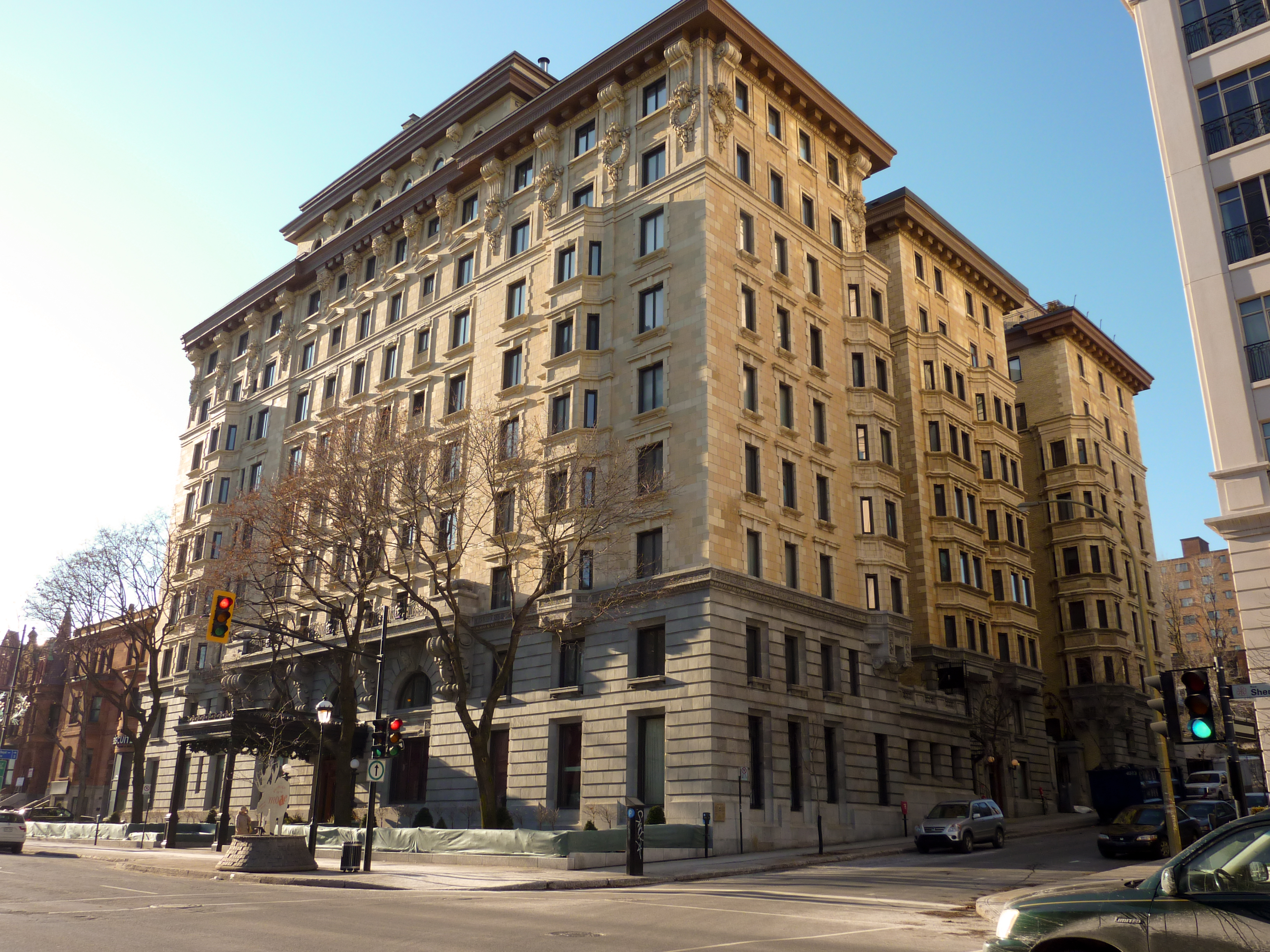
- Interactive map of the Linton Apartments area

General information
- Status: Completed
- Type: Apartments
- Architectural style: Beaux-Arts
- Location: 1509 Sherbrooke Street West, Montreal, Quebec, Canada
- Coordinates: 45.497152°N 73.581634°W
- Construction started: 1907
- Completed: 1908

Height
- Roof: 31.63 metres (103.8 ft)

Technical details
- Floor count: 10

Design and construction
- Architects: Samuel Arnold Finley; David Jerome Spence

Linton Apartments (also known as Le Linton) is an apartment building in Montreal, Quebec, Canada. It is located at 1509 Sherbrooke Street West in the Golden Square Mile neighbourhood of Montreal.

Le Linton was designed by Samuel Arnold Finley and David Jerome Spence. Its construction began in 1907 and the building was completed in 1908. It has 10 floors and is 31.63 metres tall. The building is considered to be of beaux-arts architecture. Its facade is made of terracotta and the ornamentation is made of baked clay.

== History ==
Montreal's largest apartment building upon completion, the Linton appealed to well-to-do tenants as a substitute for a large house requiring servants, which were becoming increasingly difficult to find, at the time. The building offered such services as a dry cleaner and caterer, and featured such then-modern amenities as an elevator, central heating, electric doorbell, telephone switchboard and dumbwaiter.
