= William Alexander Molson House =

Building in Montreal

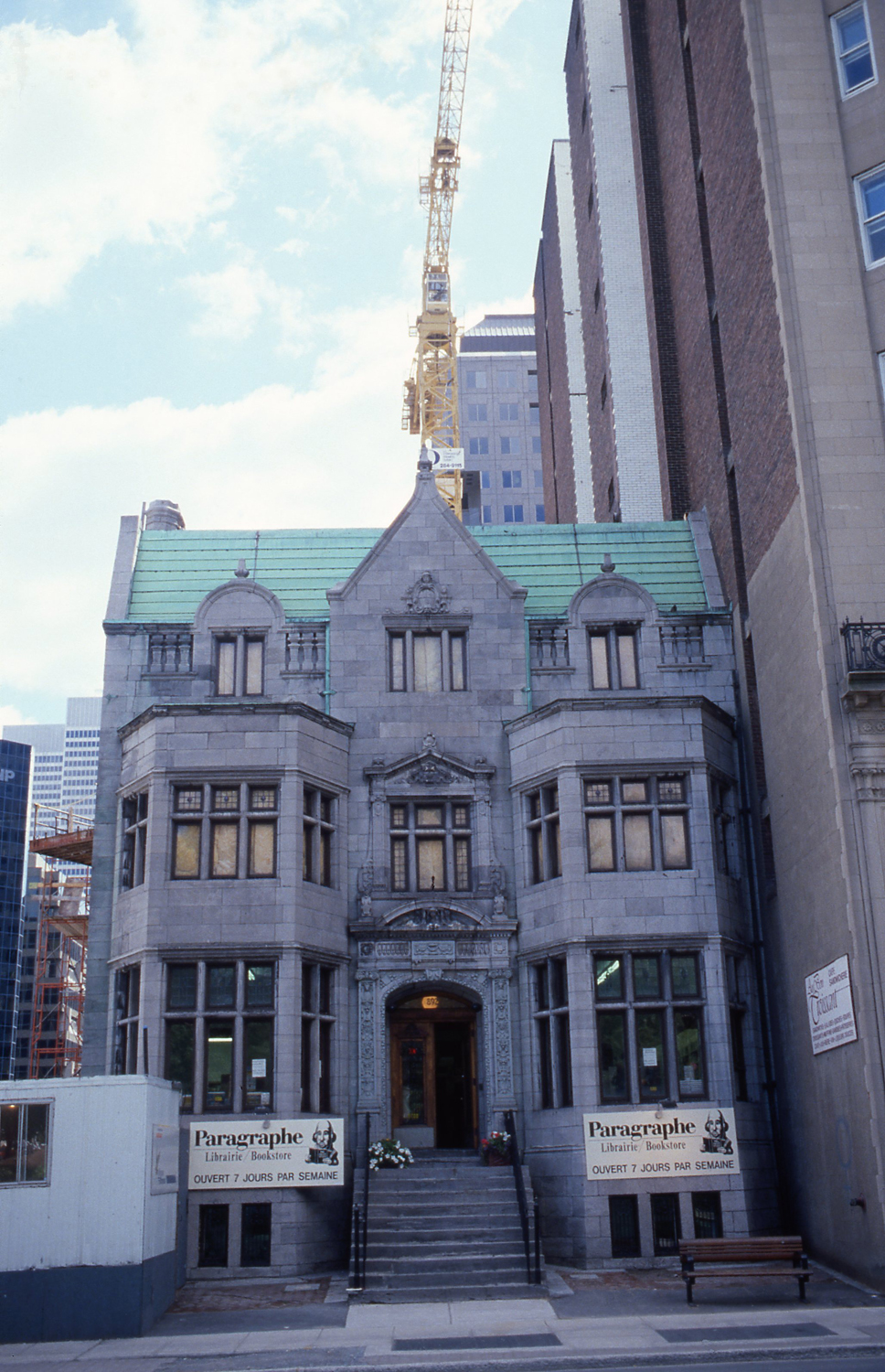
- View of the house in 1989
- Interactive map of the William Alexander Molson House area

General information
- Architectural style: Edwardian architecture
- Location: Montreal, Quebec, Canada, 892 Sherbrooke Street West
- Coordinates: 45°30′12″N 73°34′29″W
- Completed: 1906
- Client: William Alexander Molson

Technical details
- Material: Grey limestone

Design and construction
- Architect: Robert Findlay

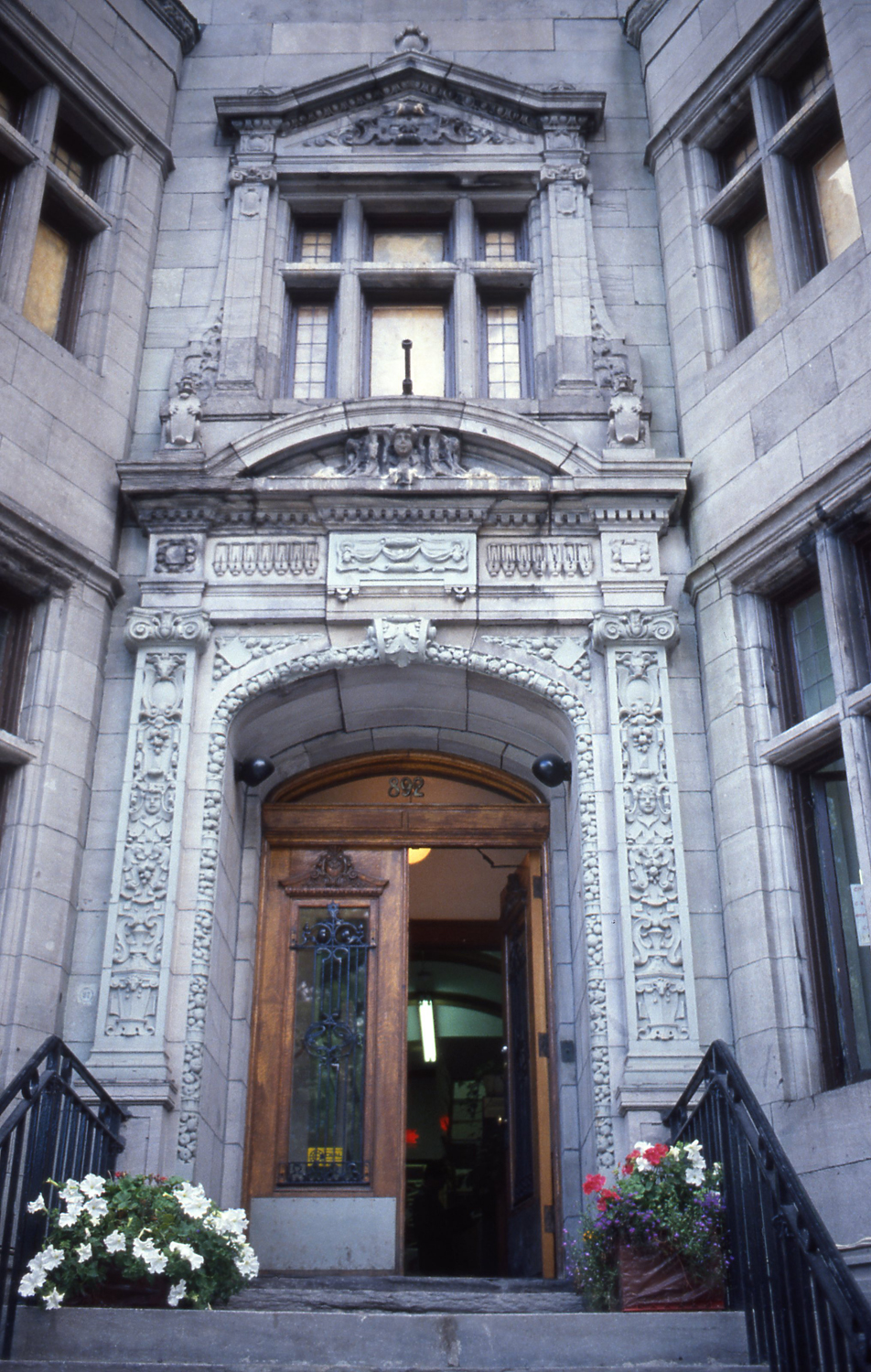

The William Alexander Molson House, sometimes called the W. A. Molson House, is an Edwardian residence located in Montreal's Golden Square Mile. Built in 1906 for Dr. W.A. Molson, it stands today as a testament to the grand residences that once lined this section of Sherbrooke Street and McGill College Avenue.

== History ==
The building was designed by Montreal architect Robert Findlay for physician William Alexander Molson, a member of the Molson family. The residence, built of grey limestone, is representative of early 20th-century Edwardian architecture. Its richly carved entrance gate reflects the influence of the Jacobean style, then popular in North America.

Dr. Molson lived in the house for only a few years. He died on January 4, 1920, from heart disease. In 1925, the house was converted into a residence and offices. The house previously belonged to McGill University, which had established its space research institute there. In 1978, the university repaired the main entrance.

In 1992, the house underwent a major reconstruction: only the front façade was preserved, while the interior was completely redesigned. The building currently houses the private investment firm Distinction Capital.

A commemorative plaque on the façade recalls Dr. Molson's commitment to Montreal's underprivileged population.
