= Sherbrooke Street =

Street in Montreal, Canada

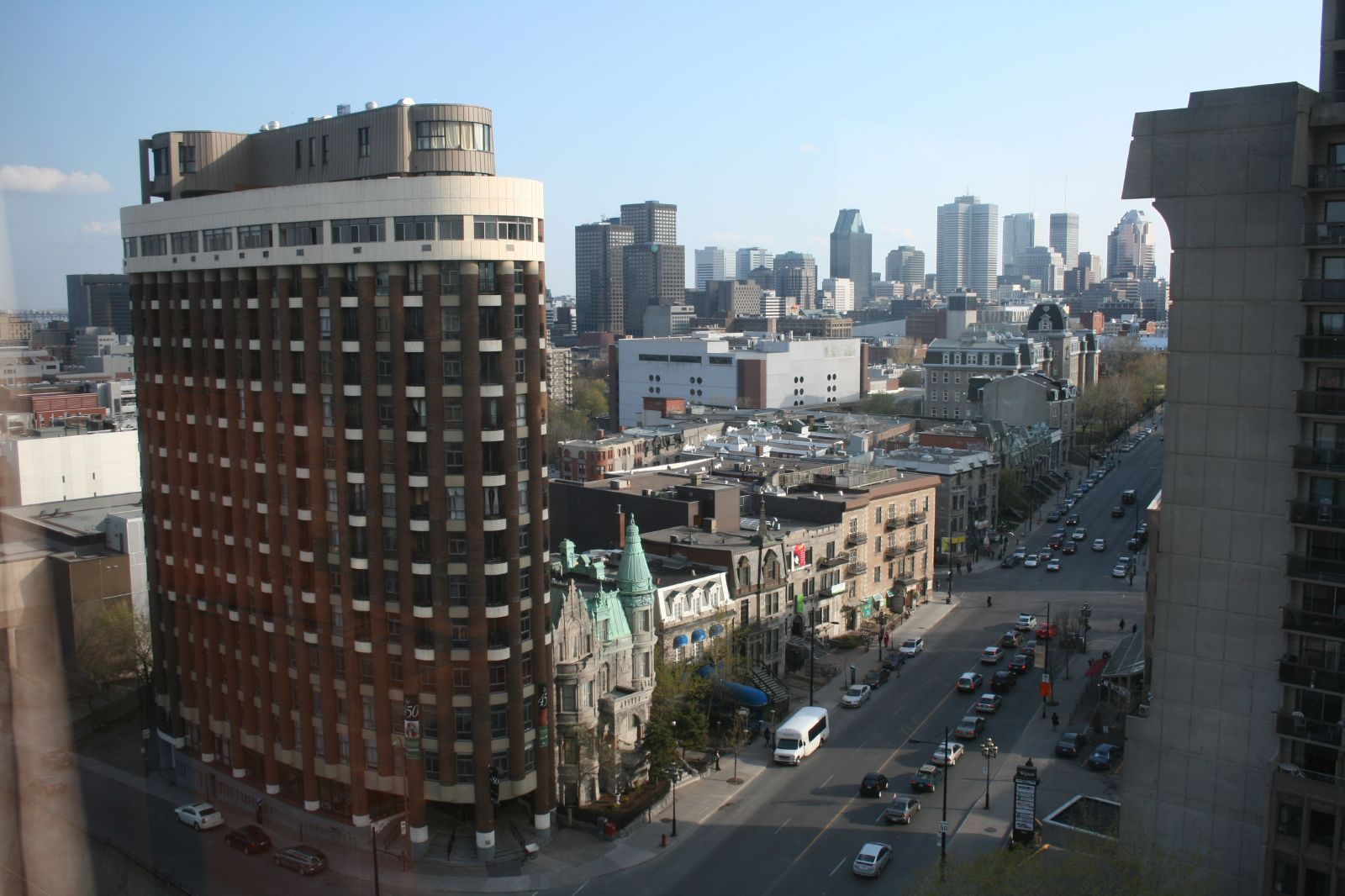
- Sherbrooke Street East at Berri Street
- Interactive map of Sherbrooke Street
- Native name: rue Sherbrooke (French)
- Part of: R-138 up to Cavendish Boulevard
- Length: 31.3 km (19.4 mi)
- Location: Island of Montreal
- Coordinates: 45°30′29″N 73°34′16″W
- West end: Avenue Westminster, Montreal West
- Major junctions: A-15 Décarie Highway; A-25 (TCH) L.-H. Lafontaine Expressway; R-335 Saint Denis Street; R-134 De Lorimier Avenue & Papineau Avenue
- East end: Notre-Dame Street, Pointe-aux-Trembles

Construction
- Construction start: 1817

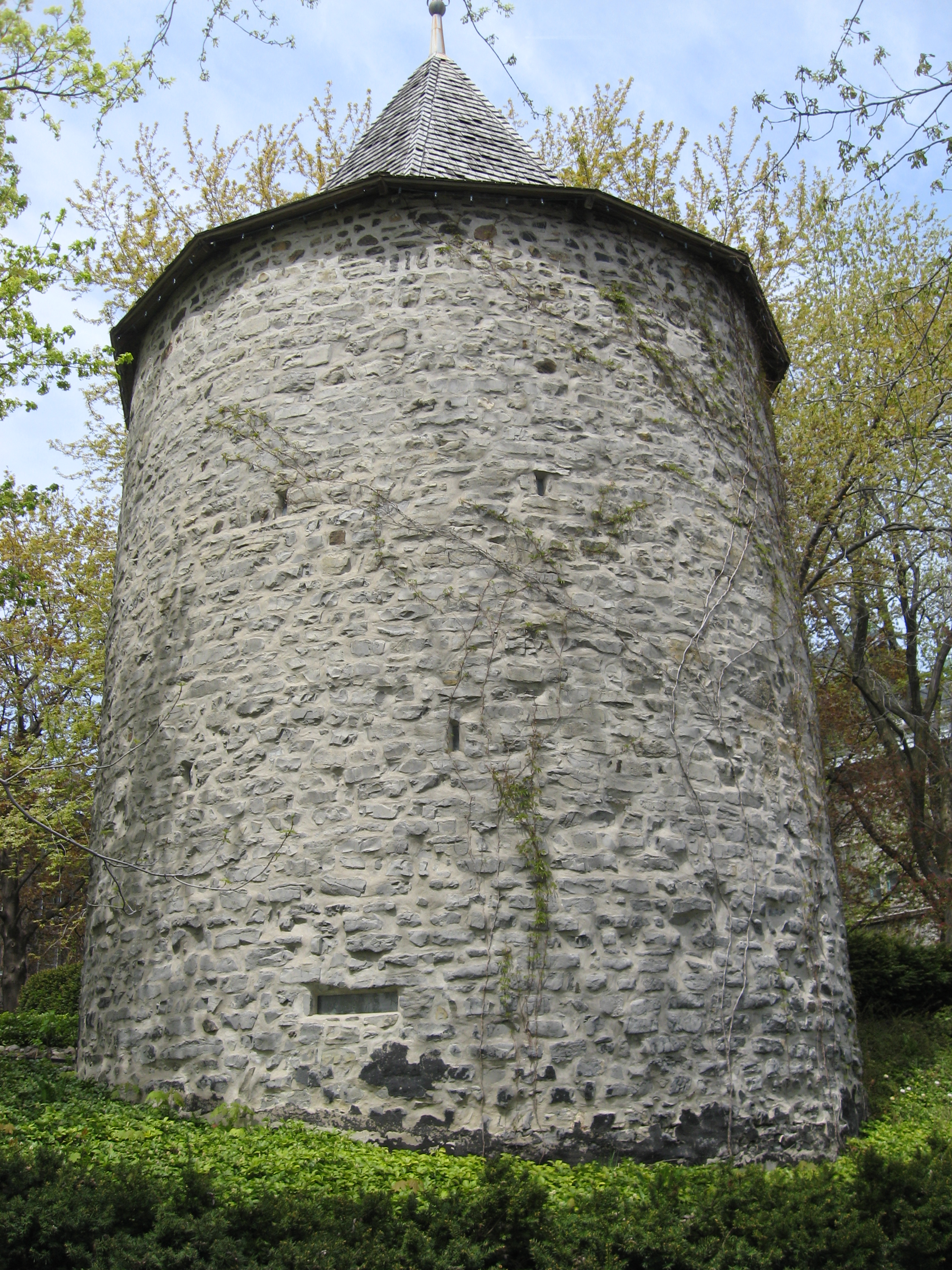
Fort Belmont 1685

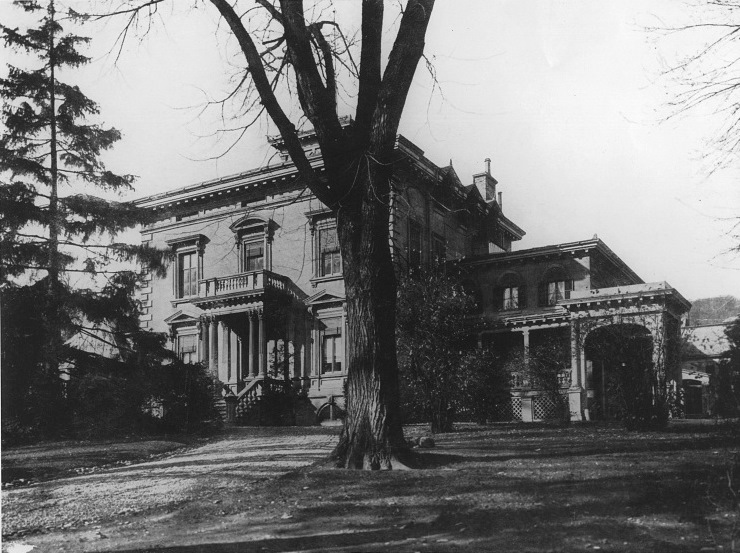
Kildonan Hall in the Golden Square Mile was typical in style of the houses that lined west Sherbrooke Street in the 1840s

Sherbrooke Street (officially in French: rue Sherbrooke) is a major east–west artery and at 31.3 kilometres (19.4 mi) in length, is the second longest street on the Island of Montreal, Canada. The street begins in the town of Montreal West and ends on the extreme tip of the island in Pointe-aux-Trembles, intersecting Gouin Boulevard and joining up with Notre-Dame Street. East of Cavendish Boulevard this road is part of Quebec Route 138.

The street is divided into two portions. Sherbrooke Street East (Rue Sherbrooke Est) is located east of Saint Laurent Boulevard and Sherbrooke Street West (Rue Sherbrooke Ouest) is located west. Sherbrooke Street West is home to many historic mansions that comprised its exclusive Golden Square Mile district, including the now-demolished Van Horne Mansion, the imposing Beaux-Arts style Montreal Masonic Memorial Temple as well as several historic properties incorporated into Maison Alcan, the world headquarters for Alcan.

Sherbrooke Street East runs along the edge (both administrative and topographic) of the Plateau Mont-Royal, at the top of a marked hillside known as Côte à Baron, and continues between the Montreal Botanical Garden and Parc Maisonneuve to the north and Parc Olympique to the south. The street is named for John Coape Sherbrooke, the Governor General of British North America from 1816 to 1818.

A separate street of the same name exists in the borough of Lachine but does not carry the "West" suffix and repeats numbers that are used on the longer Sherbrooke Street. The same is true for another Sherbrooke Street in the suburb of Beaconsfield.

== History ==
In 1817, Sherbrooke Street initially consisted of two sections, from de Bleury Street to Sanguinet Street. Its relative remoteness from "downtown" (at the time; now Old Montreal) made it difficult to establish industries or factories. Many nursing homes and educational institutions were established on the street in the 19th century, such as McGill University, the École normale Jacques-Cartier, the Collège Mont-Saint-Louis, and the Couvent du Bon Pasteur.

From the early 20th century to the 1930s, Sherbrooke Street was the most prestigious street in Montreal. In 1912, the Montreal Museum of Fine Arts was established on Sherbrooke Street West. Later, with the expansion of the city centre, luxurious new houses were built a little farther west in the new garden city of Westmount.

Sherbrooke Street was extended eastward from the early 20th century and followed the urban development of Montreal eastward. It was central to the creation of several institutions and parks such as La Fontaine Park, the Notre-Dame Hospital, Maisonneuve Park, Montreal Botanical Garden and Olympic Stadium.

In 1976, the street was to be venue for an 8 km exhibit of art, Corridart, during the 1976 Summer Olympics. However, in a controversial decision, former Mayor Jean Drapeau had the exhibition torn down two days before the Games began.

== Educational institutions ==
Three of Montreal's four major universities are on Sherbrooke Street. Downtown is the main campus of McGill University, and farther west is the Loyola Campus of Concordia University. The street also has UQAM's Complexe des sciences Pierre-Dansereau and INRS's Montréal campus as well as Dawson College, Collège de Maisonneuve CEGEPs, and the Collège de Montréal.

== Transportation ==
All of Montreal Metro's Green Line stations east of Assomption station are located near the street. There is also an Orange Line station at Berri Street. The street is primarily served by the bus routes 24 Sherbrooke, 105 Sherbrooke, 185 Sherbrooke, and 186 Sherbrooke Est.

Exo's Montreal-Ouest station is located near the western end of the street.

== Attractions ==
Other key attractions on the street include the Montreal Museum of Fine Arts, Grand Séminaire de Montréal, McCord Museum, Ritz-Carlton Montreal, Holt Renfrew, Parc Lafontaine, and further east, the Château Dufresne, Olympic Stadium, Montreal Botanical Garden, and the Montreal Biodome.

== Image gallery ==
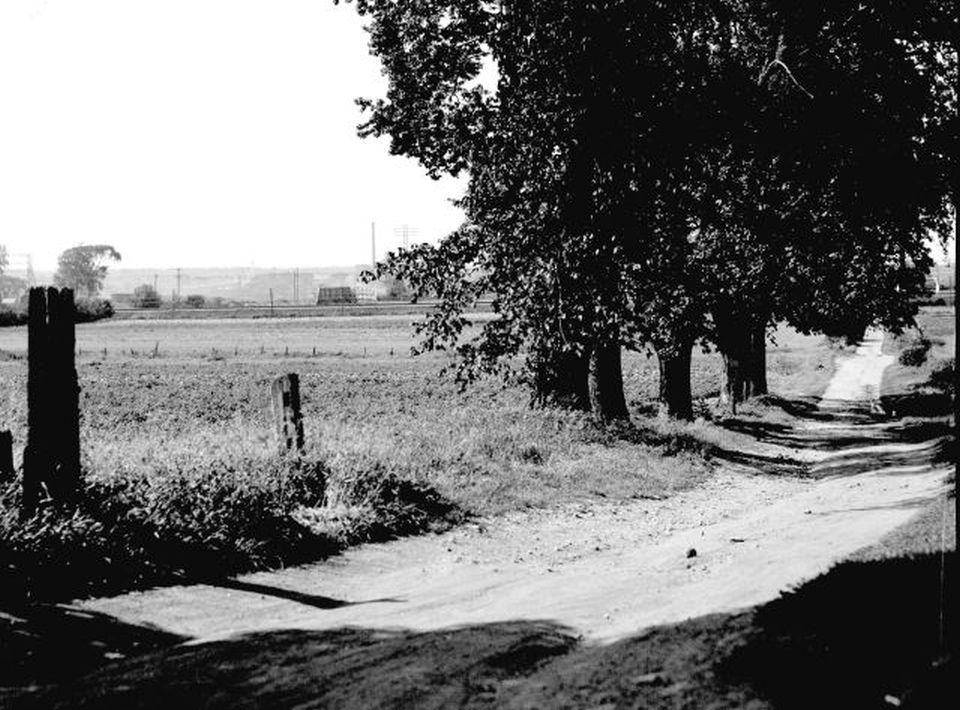
Sherbrooke Street West in 1842

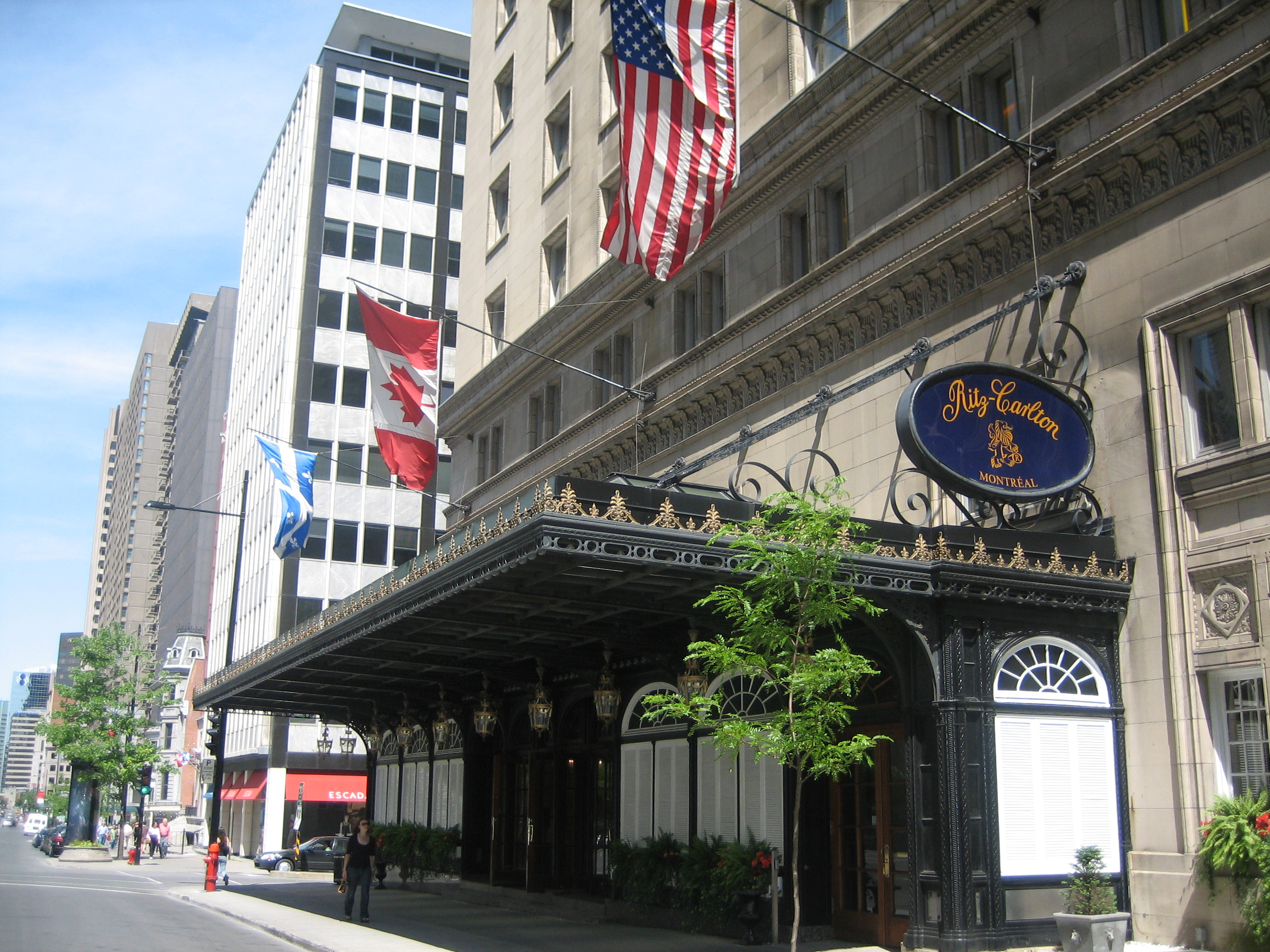
The Ritz-Carlton

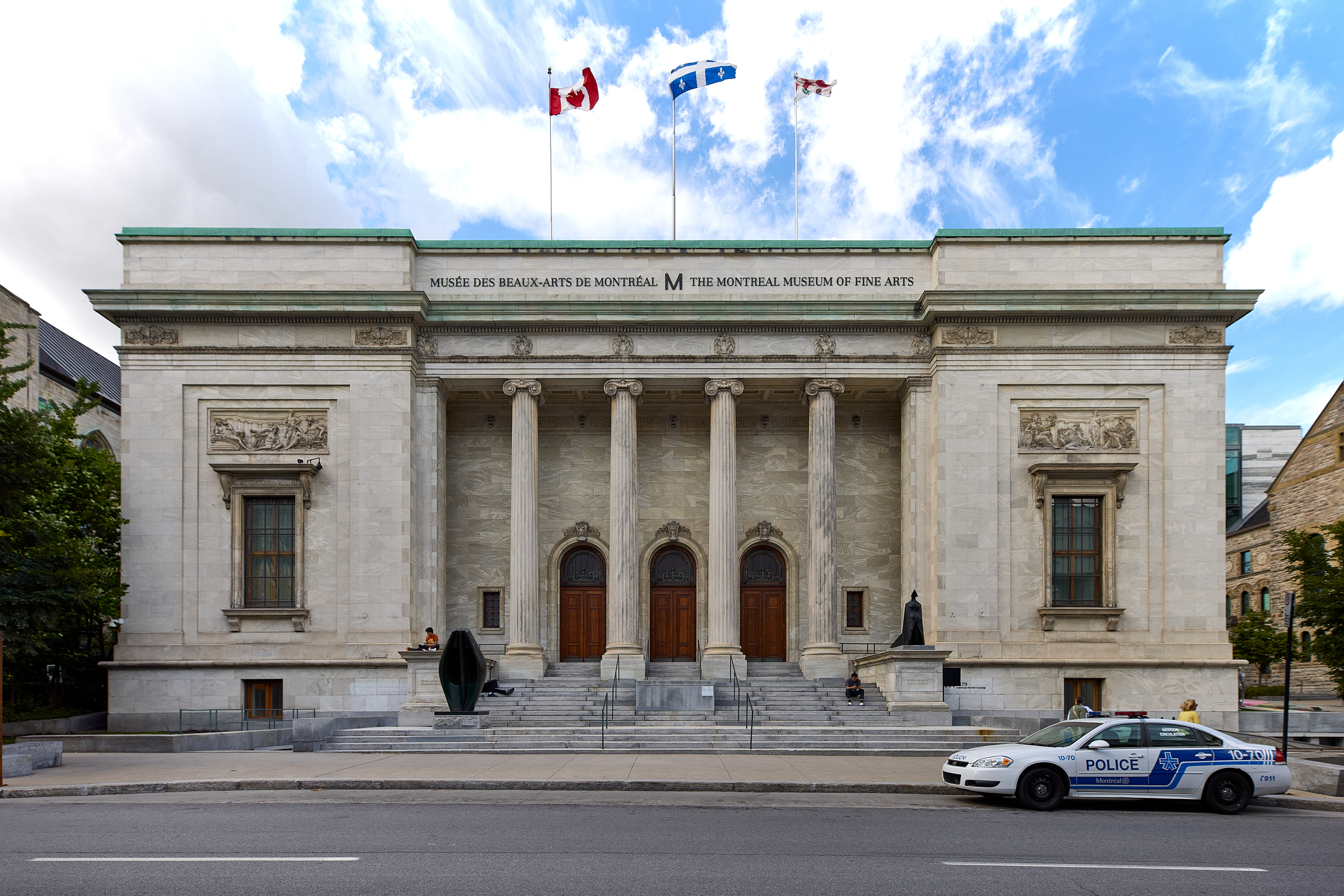
Montreal Museum of Fine Arts

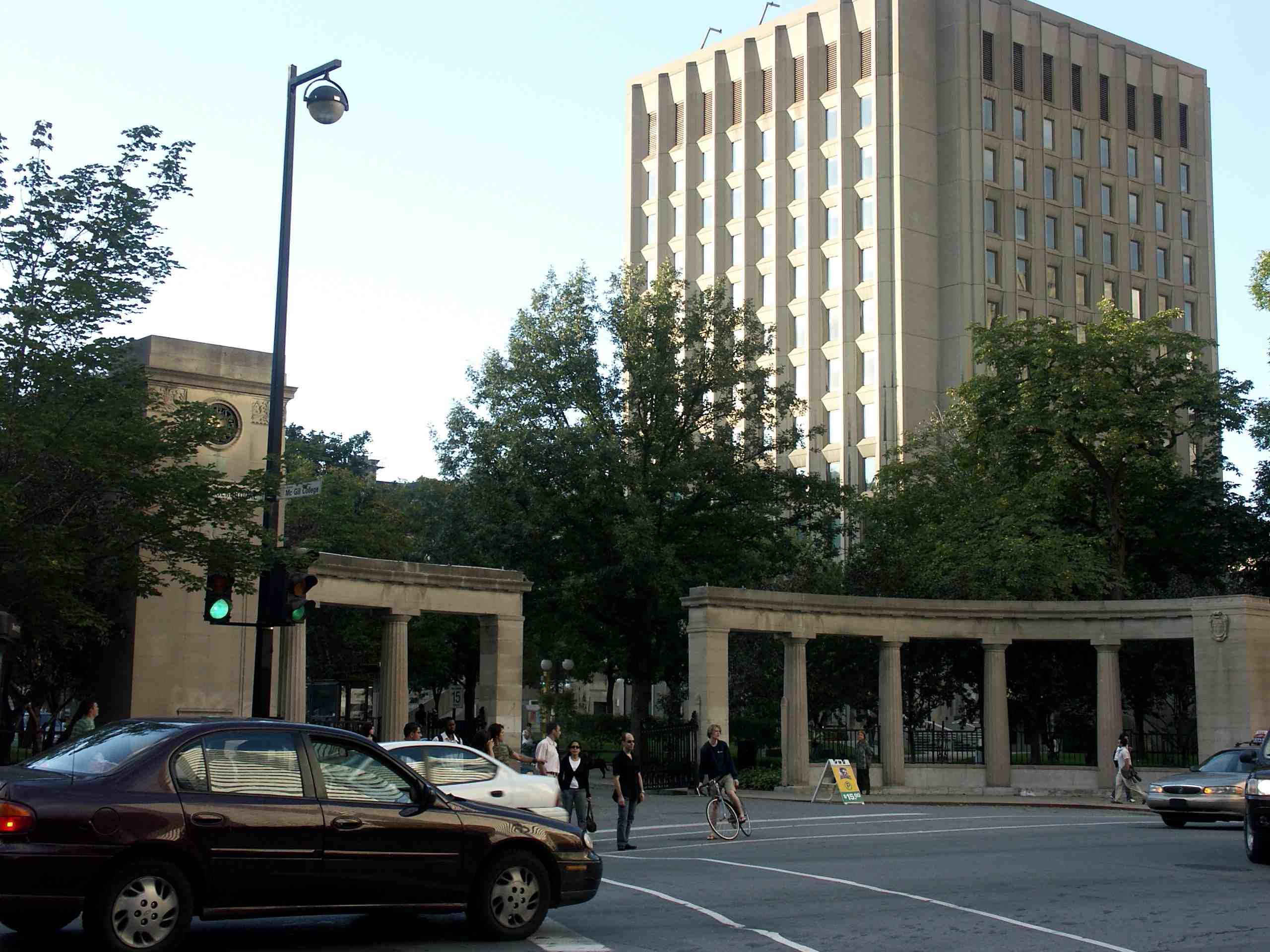
McGill University's Roddick Gates, on Sherbrooke

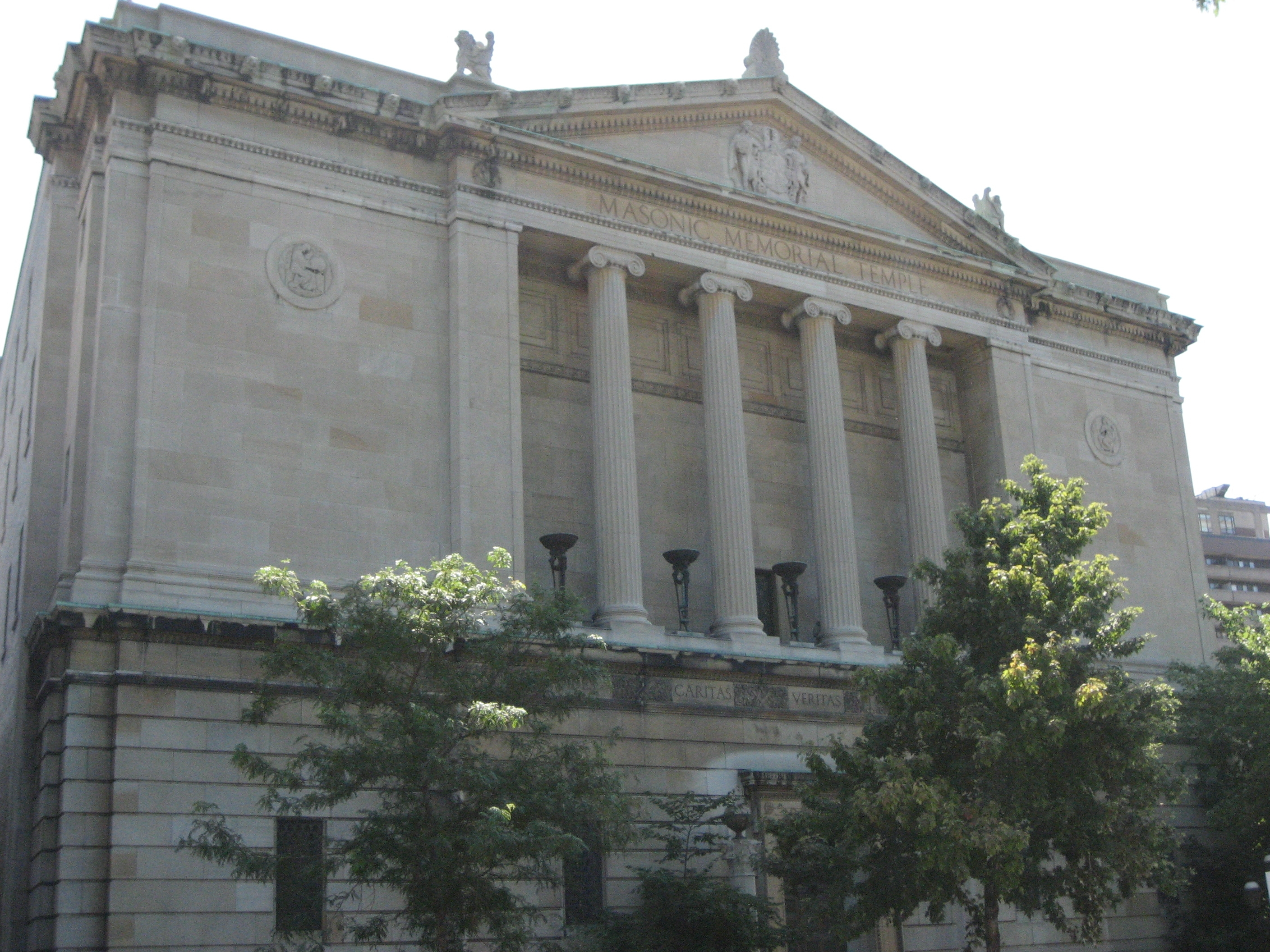
Montreal Masonic Memorial Temple, located on Sherbrooke Street West.

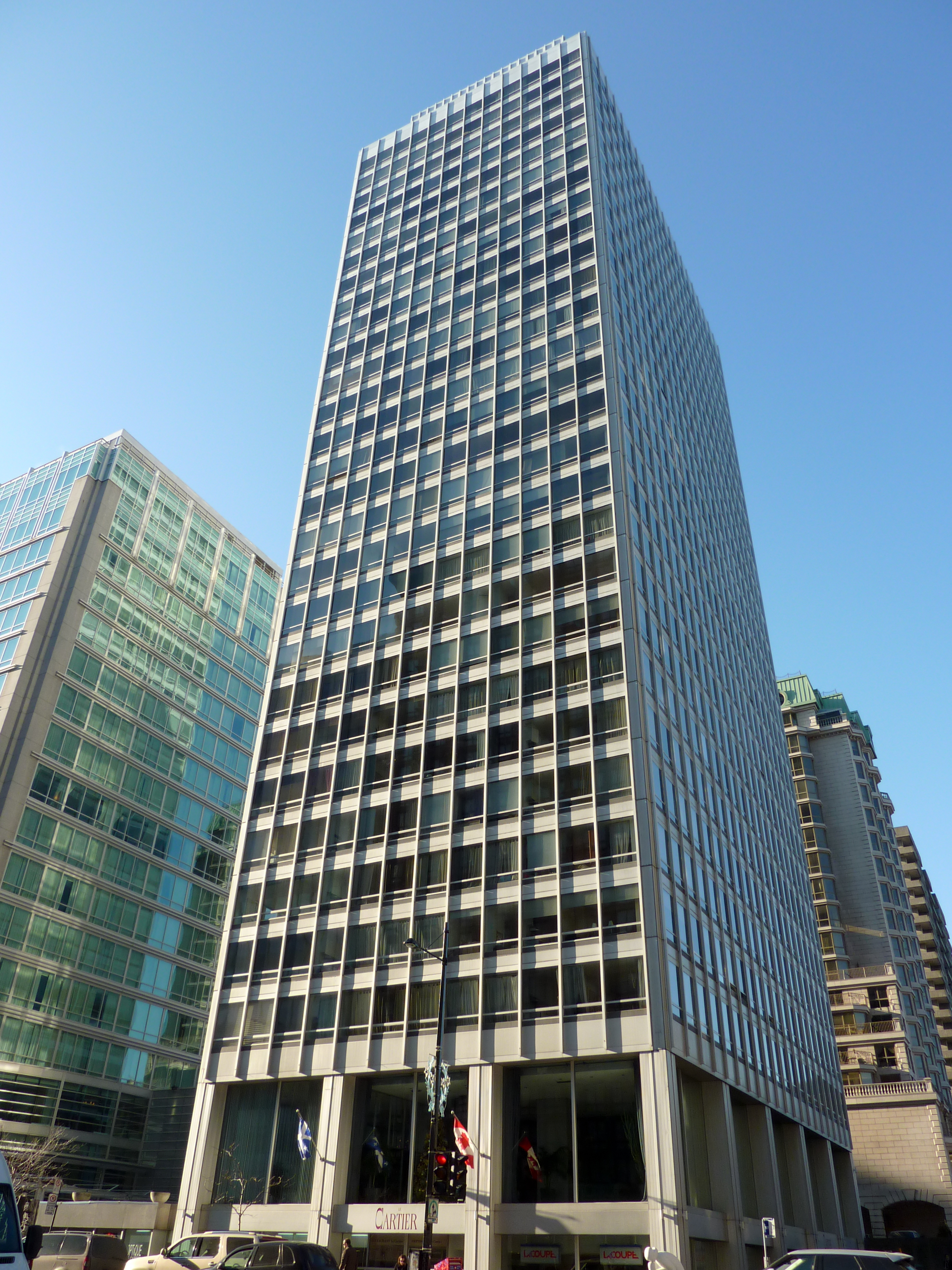
Le Cartier Apartments on the corner of Peel Street.

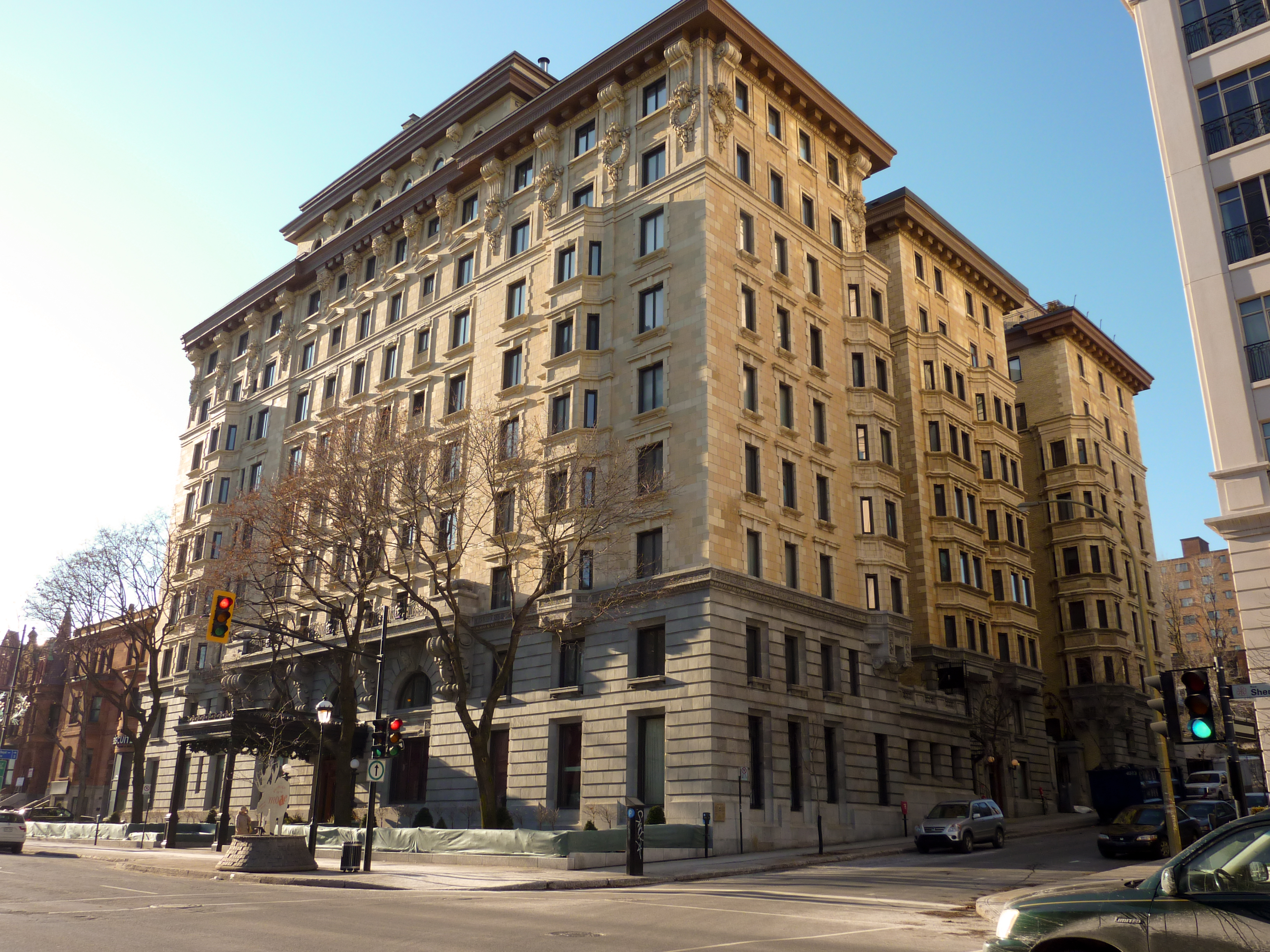
Linton Apartments.

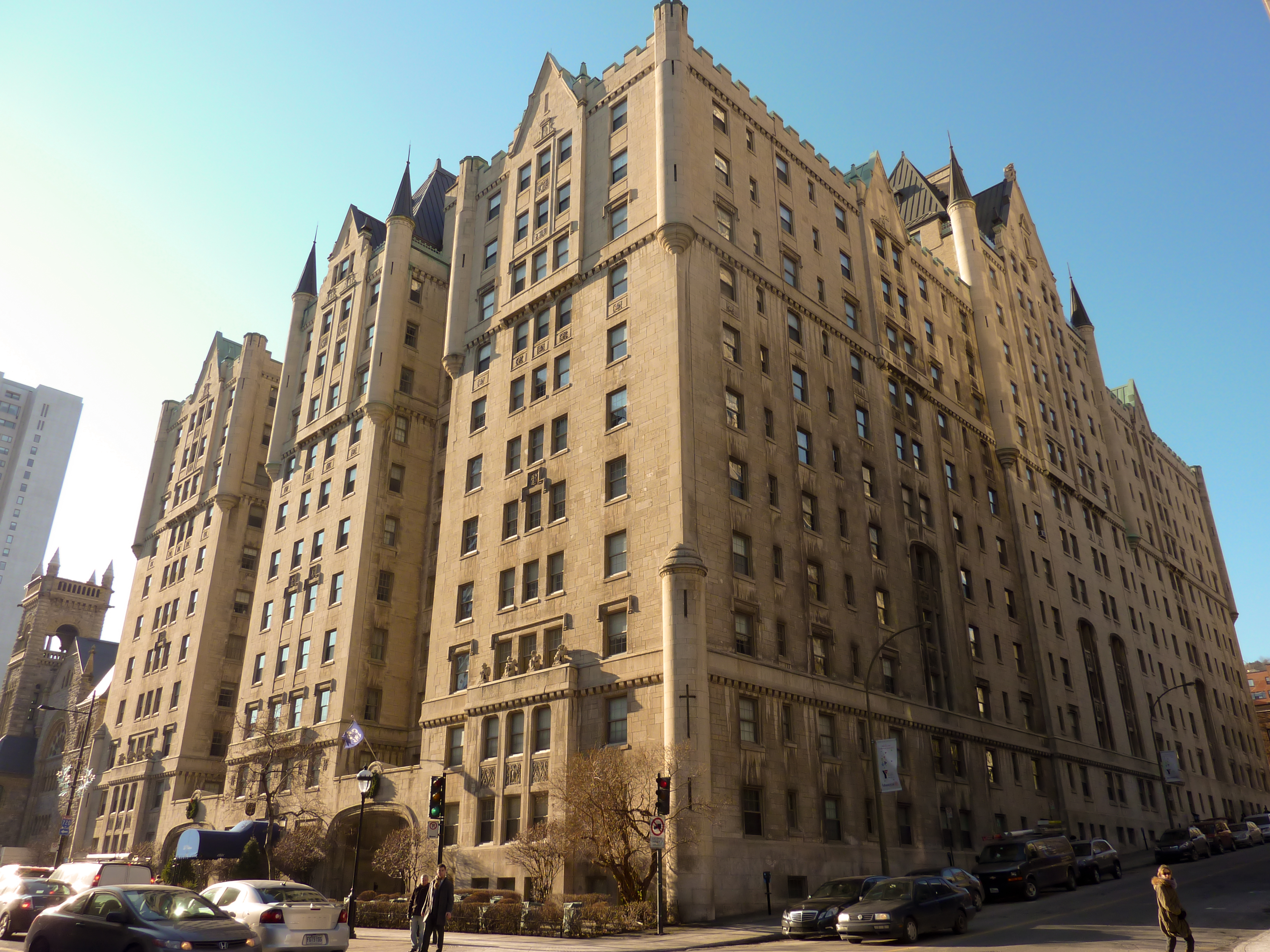
Le Château Apartments.

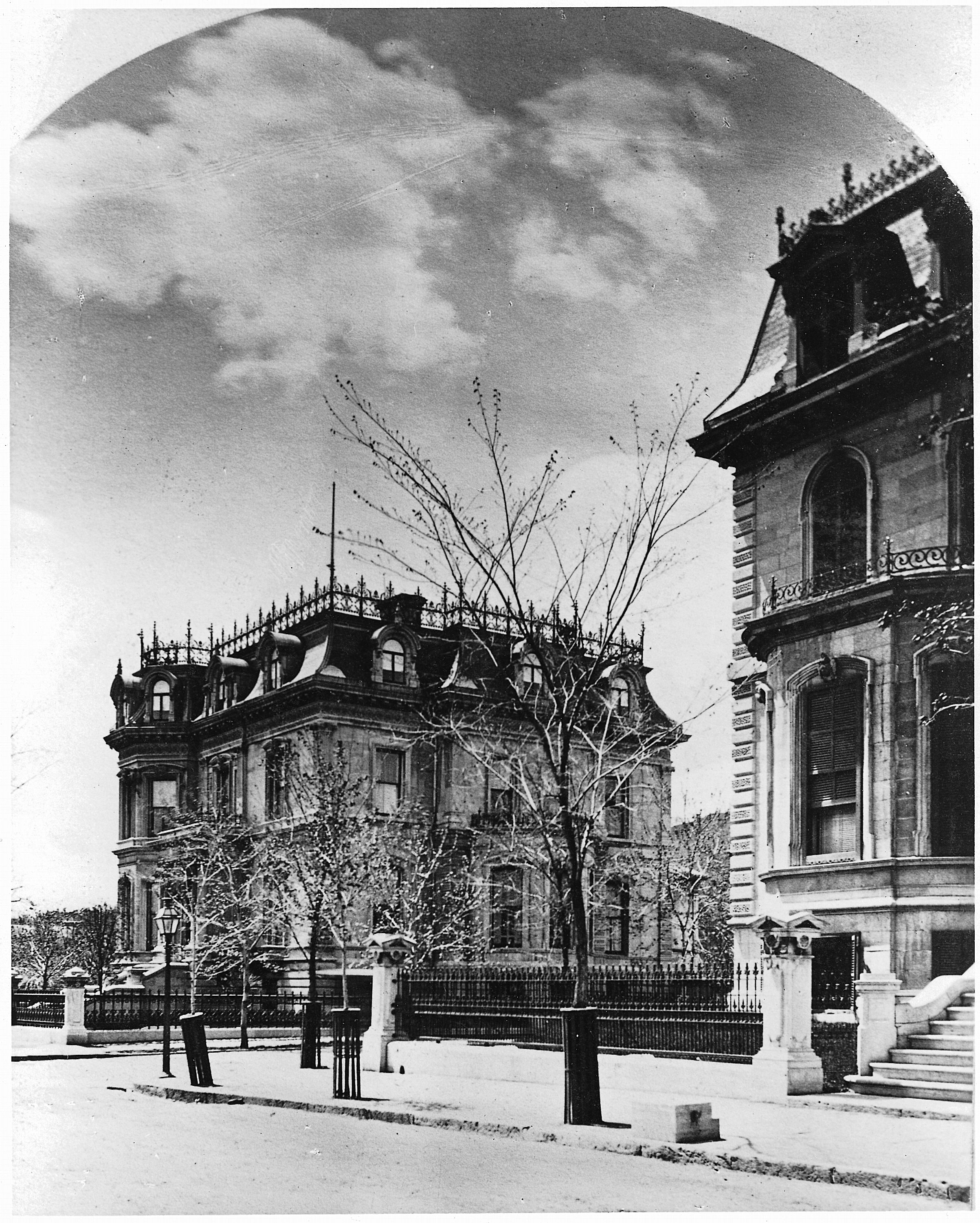
William Workman's house on Sherbrooke in the Golden Square Mile. Built 1842, demolished 1952

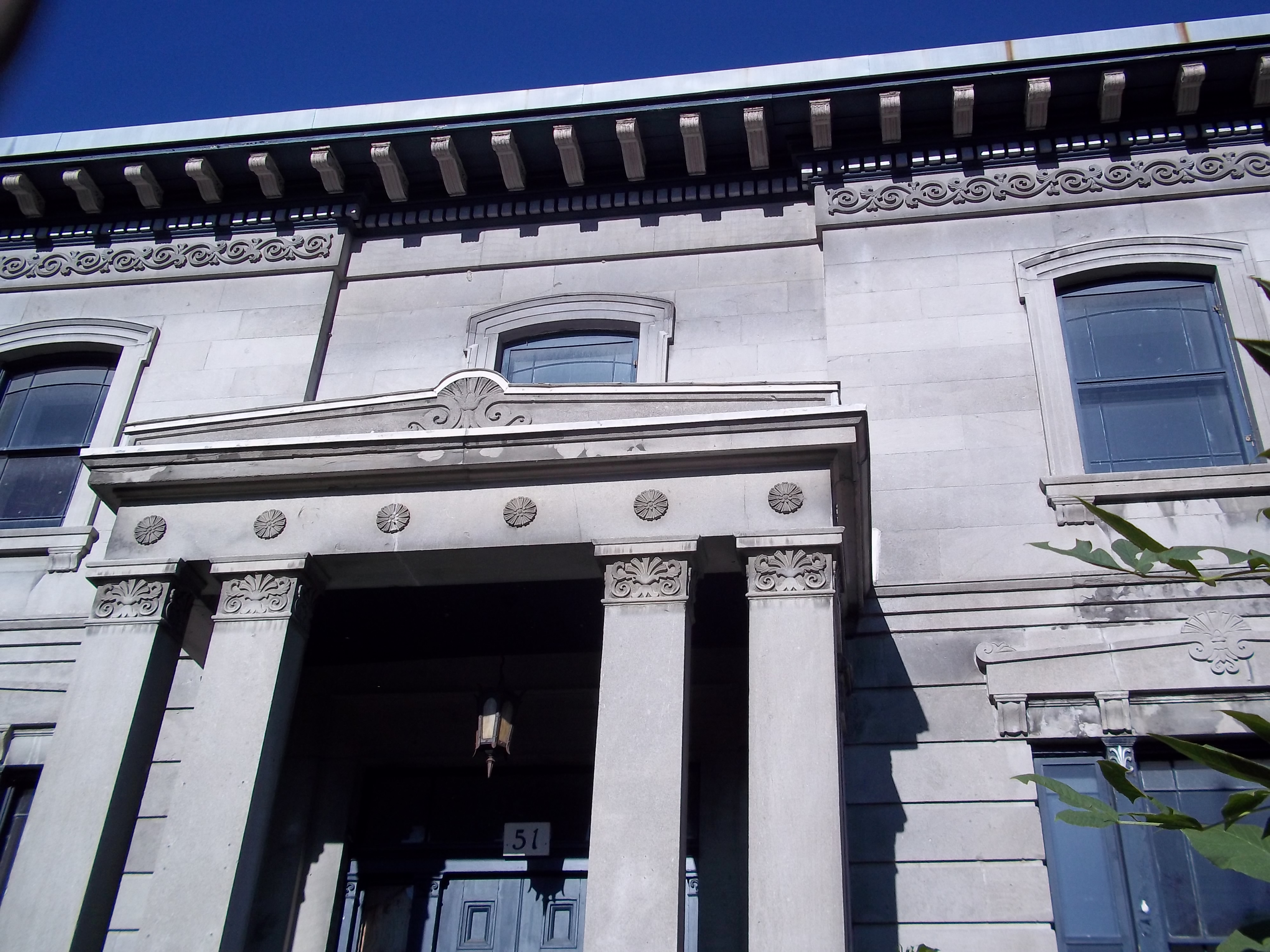
The Notman House at 51 Sherbrooke Street West was built 1843-45

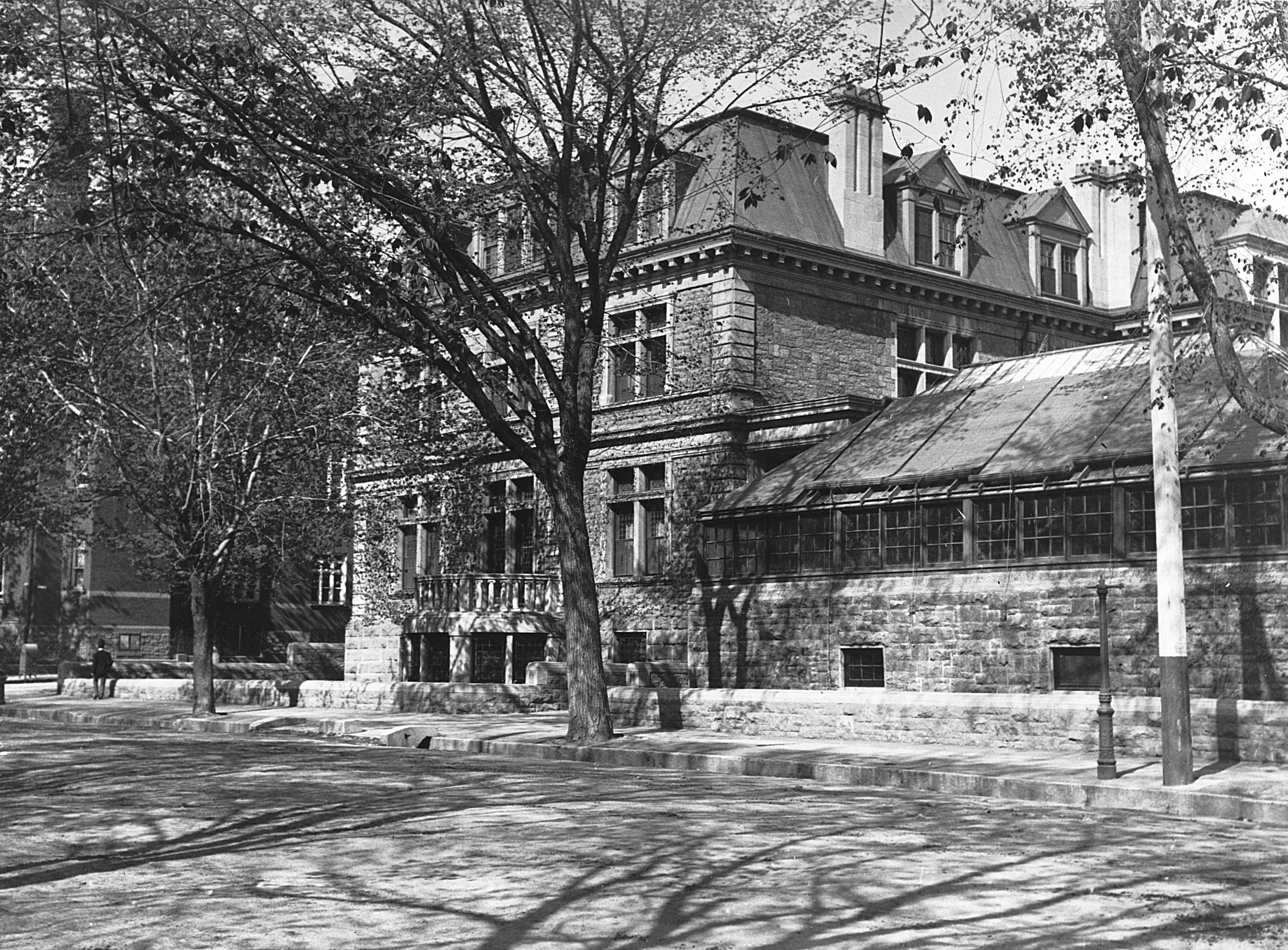
Van Horne Mansion on Sherbrooke. Built 1869, controversially demolished 1973

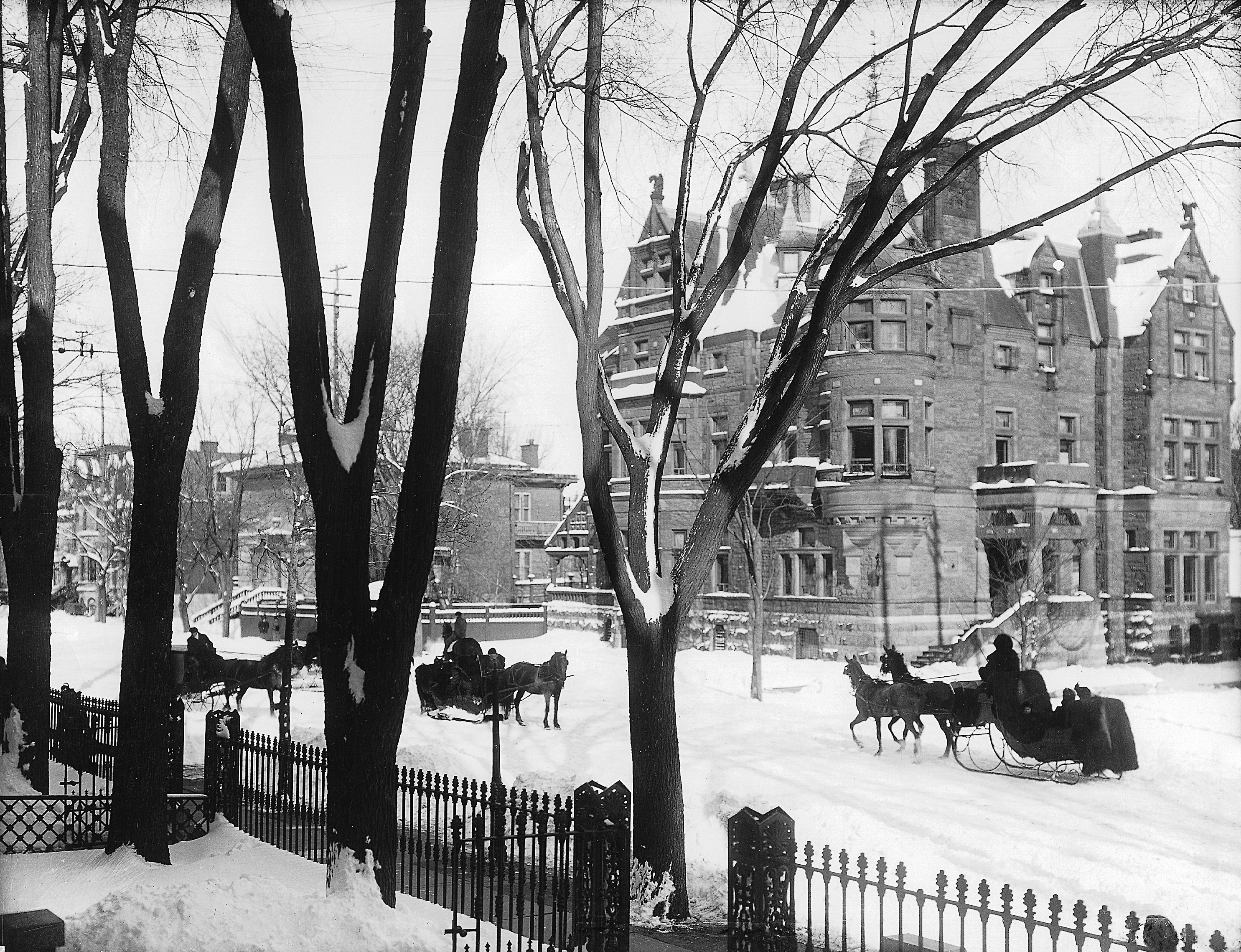
Sir George Drummond's House, built in the 1880s on Sherbrooke, at the corner of Drummond. Torn down in 1930, the site was used as a car wash

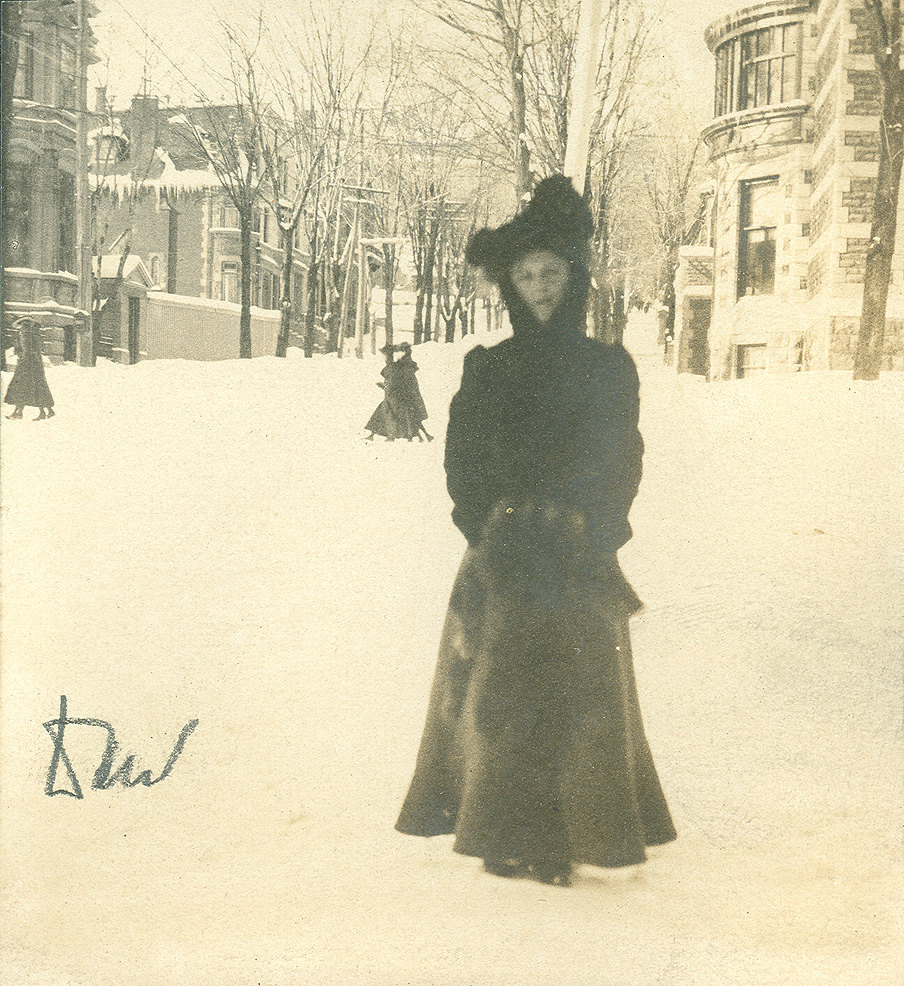
Marjory Clouston on Sherbrooke with Drummond Street leading up to Mount Royal behind her, 1902

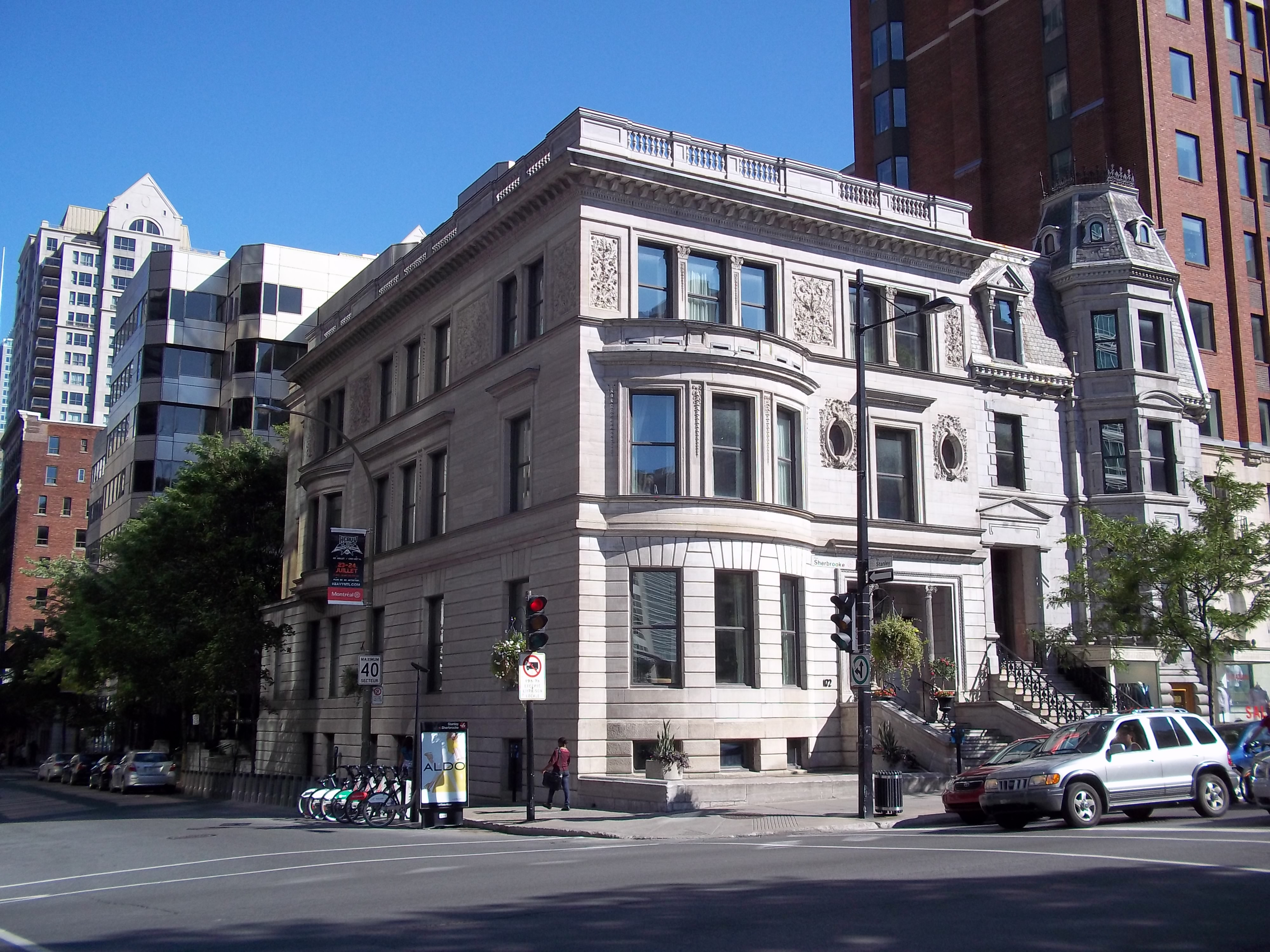
Lord Atholstan's House on Sherbrooke in the Golden Square Mile

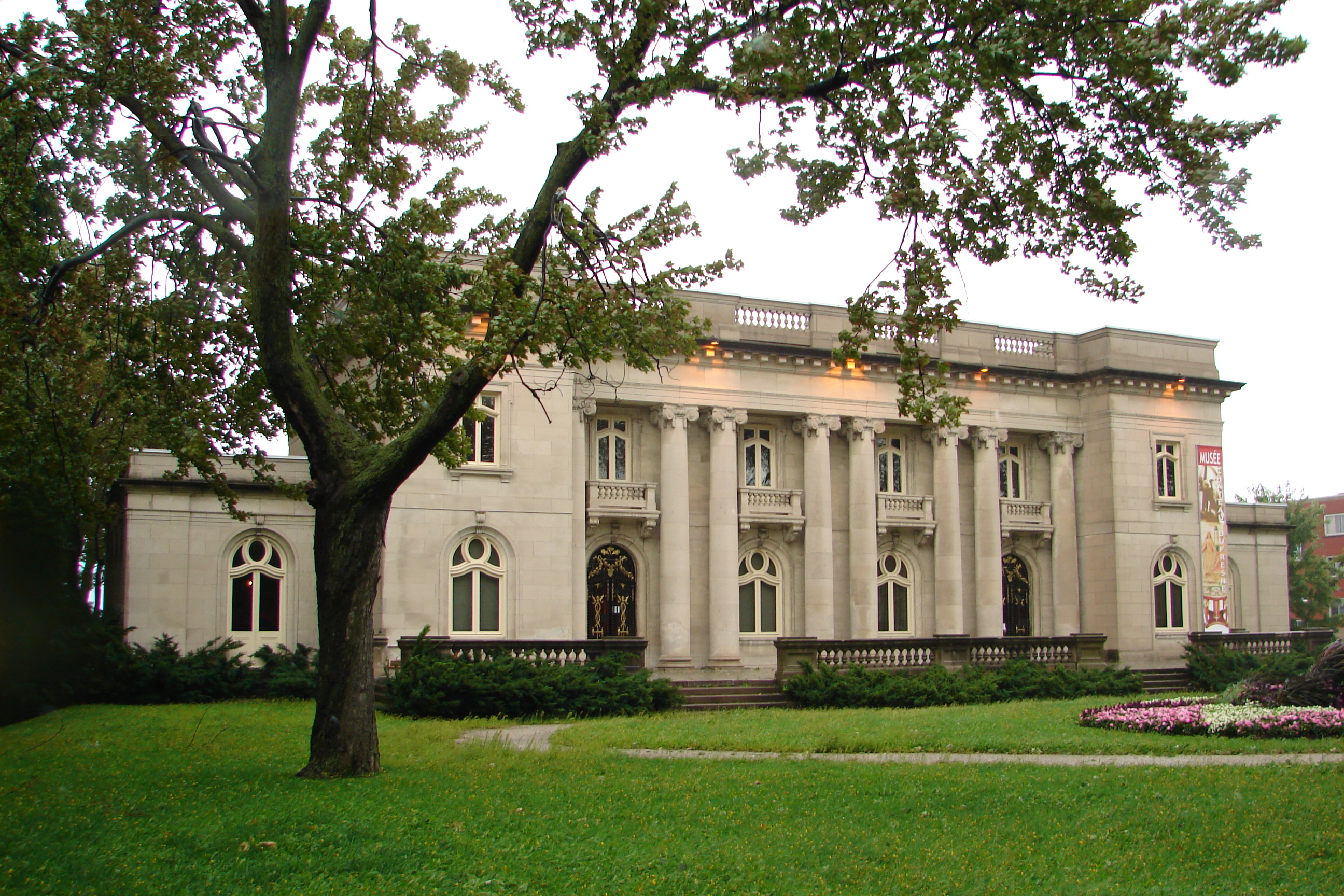
Château Dufresne Sherbrooke East

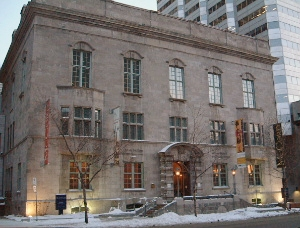
McCord Stewart Museum at 690 Sherbrooke Street West

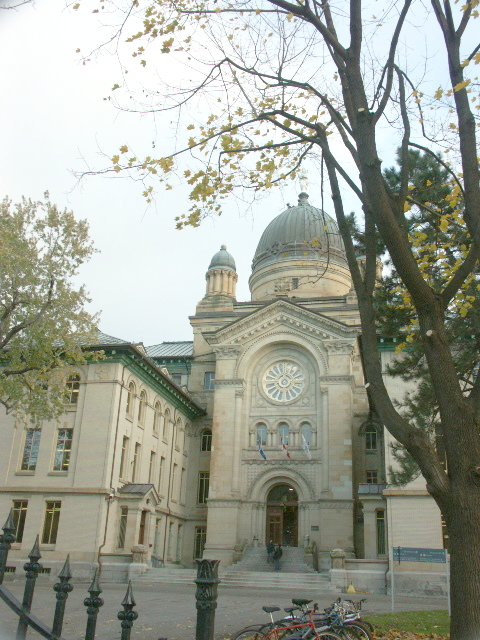
Dawson College

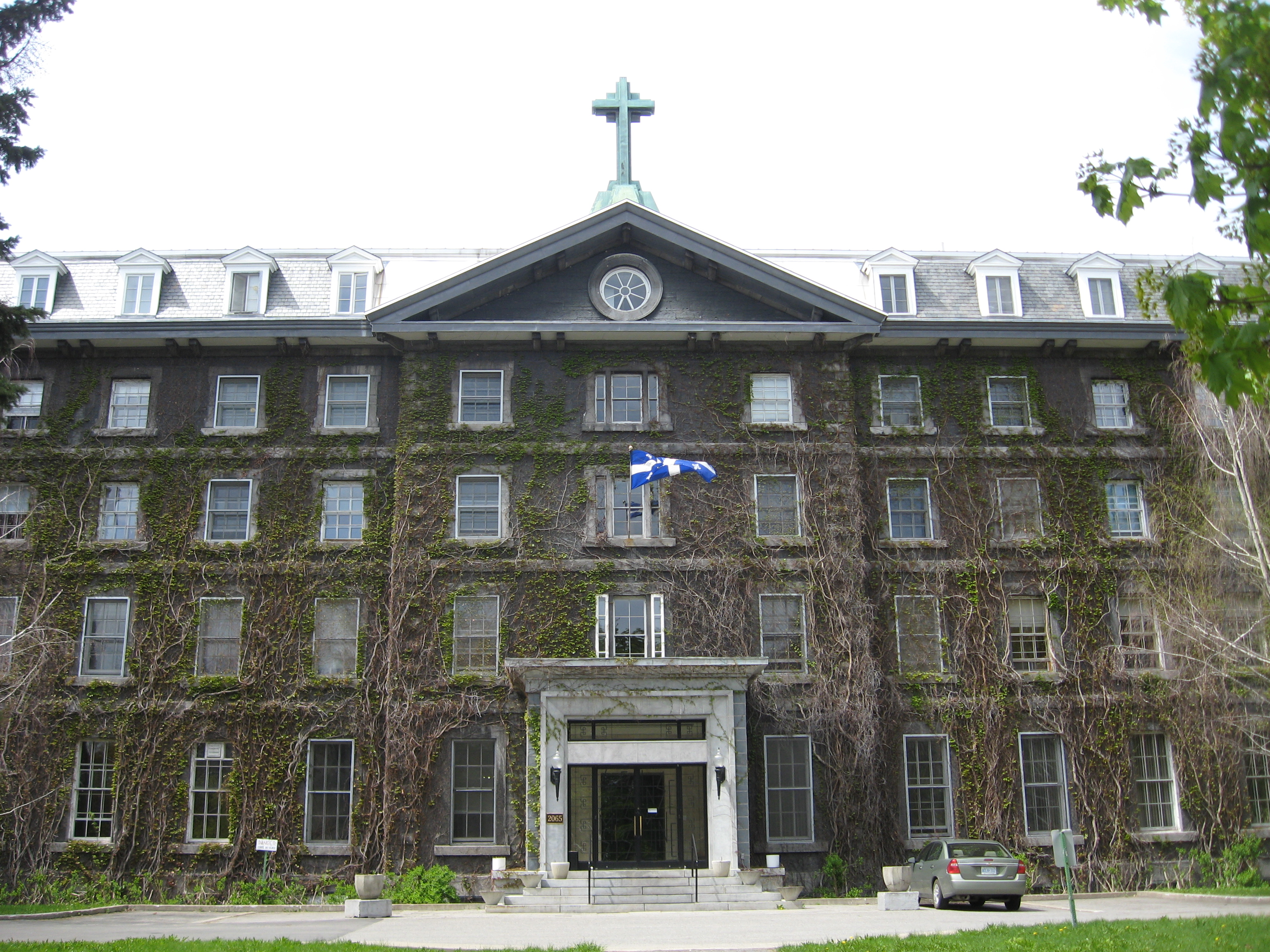
Collège de Montréal

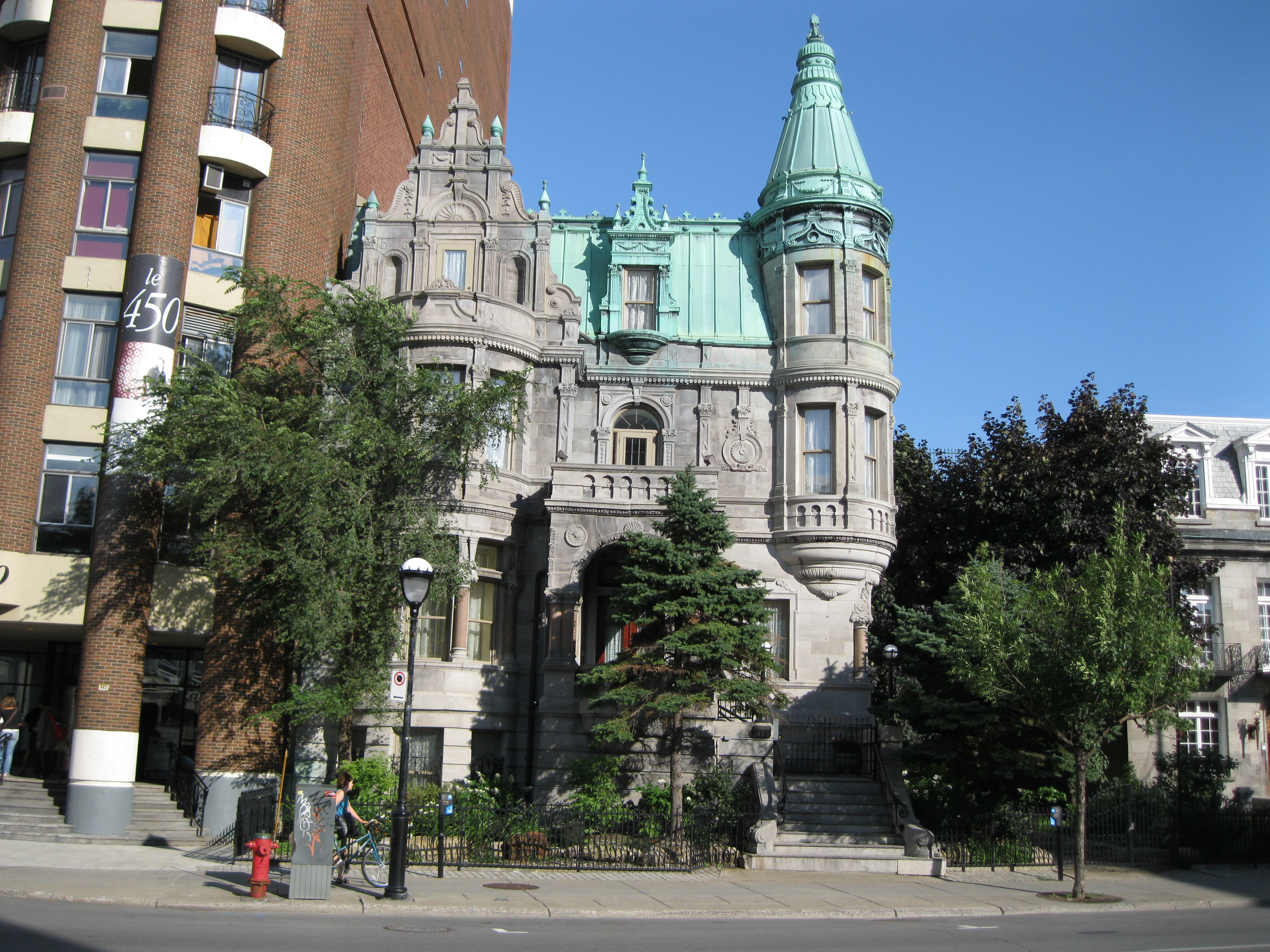
Maison Arthur Dubuc

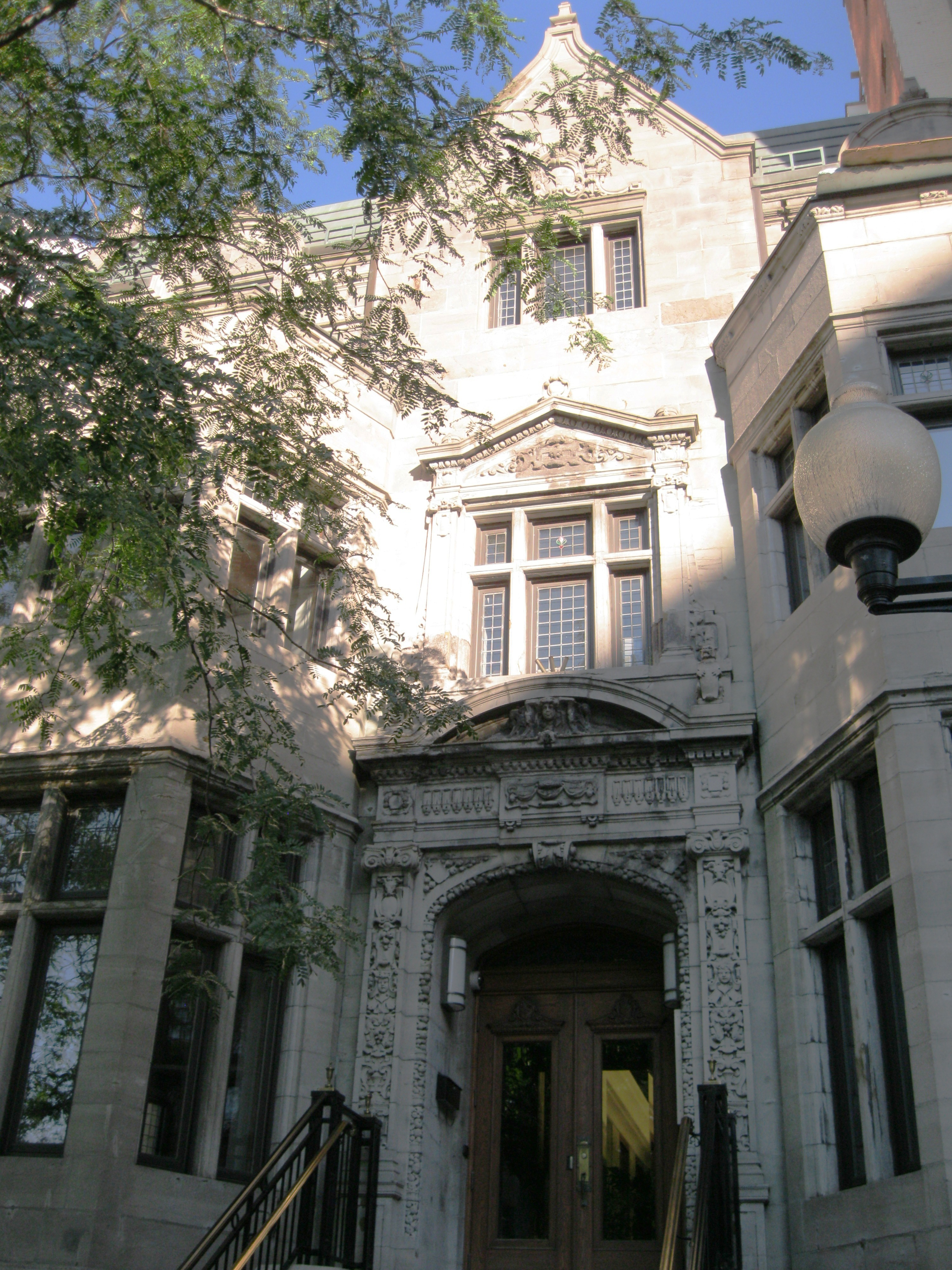
William Alexander Molson House

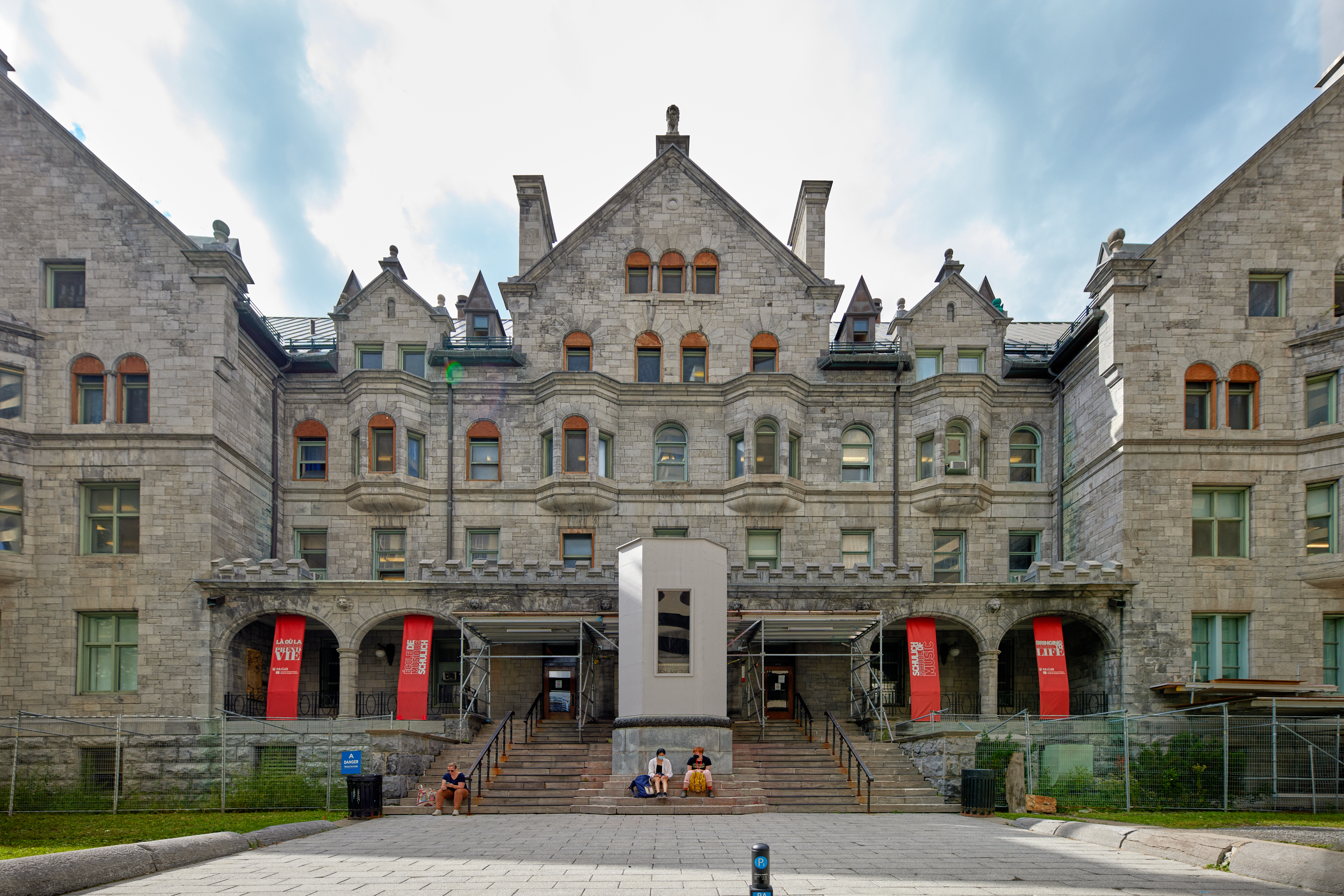
Strathcona Music Building, McGill University

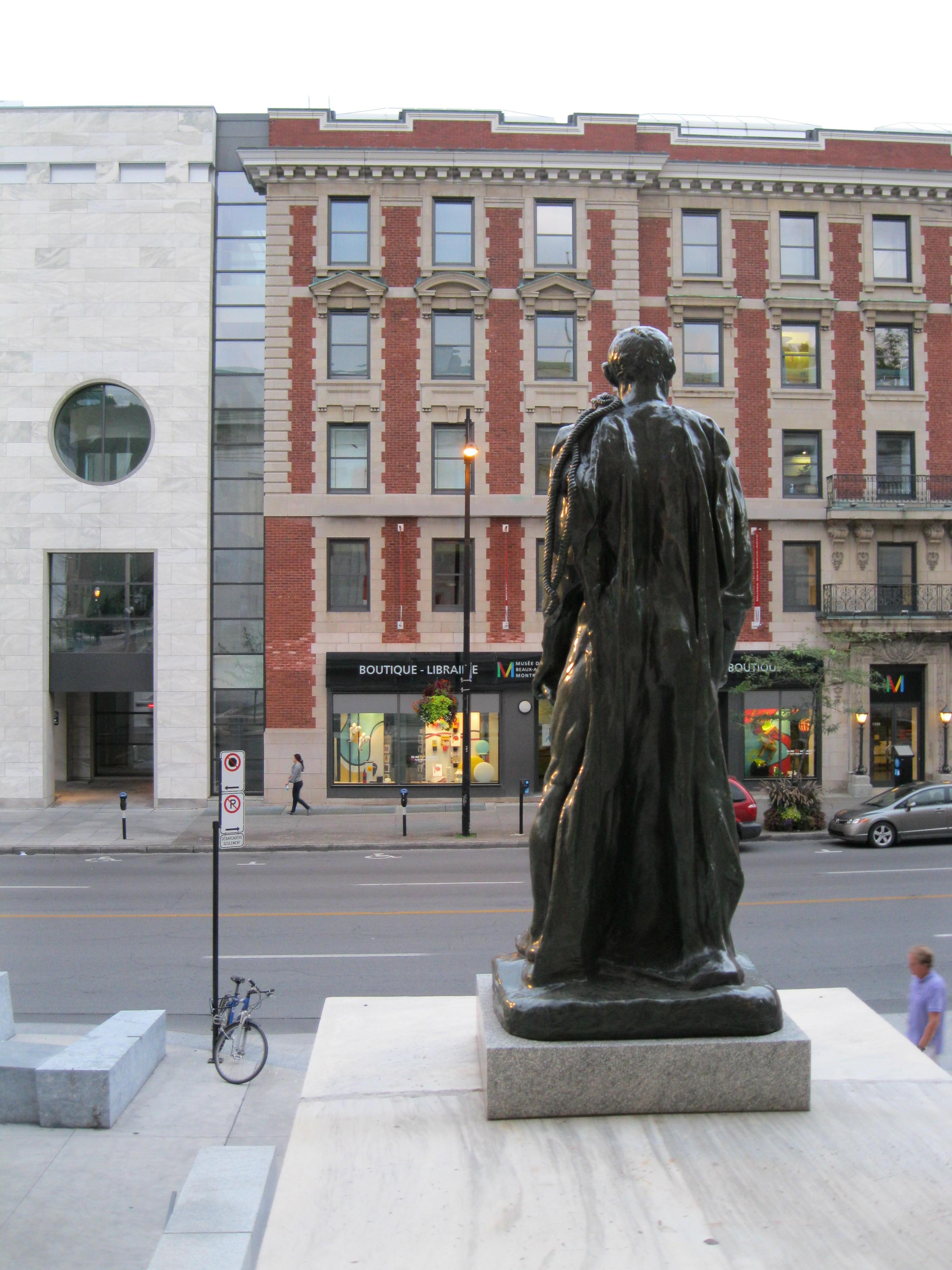
Jean d'Aire (1887) by Auguste Rodin in front of the Montreal Museum of Fine Arts

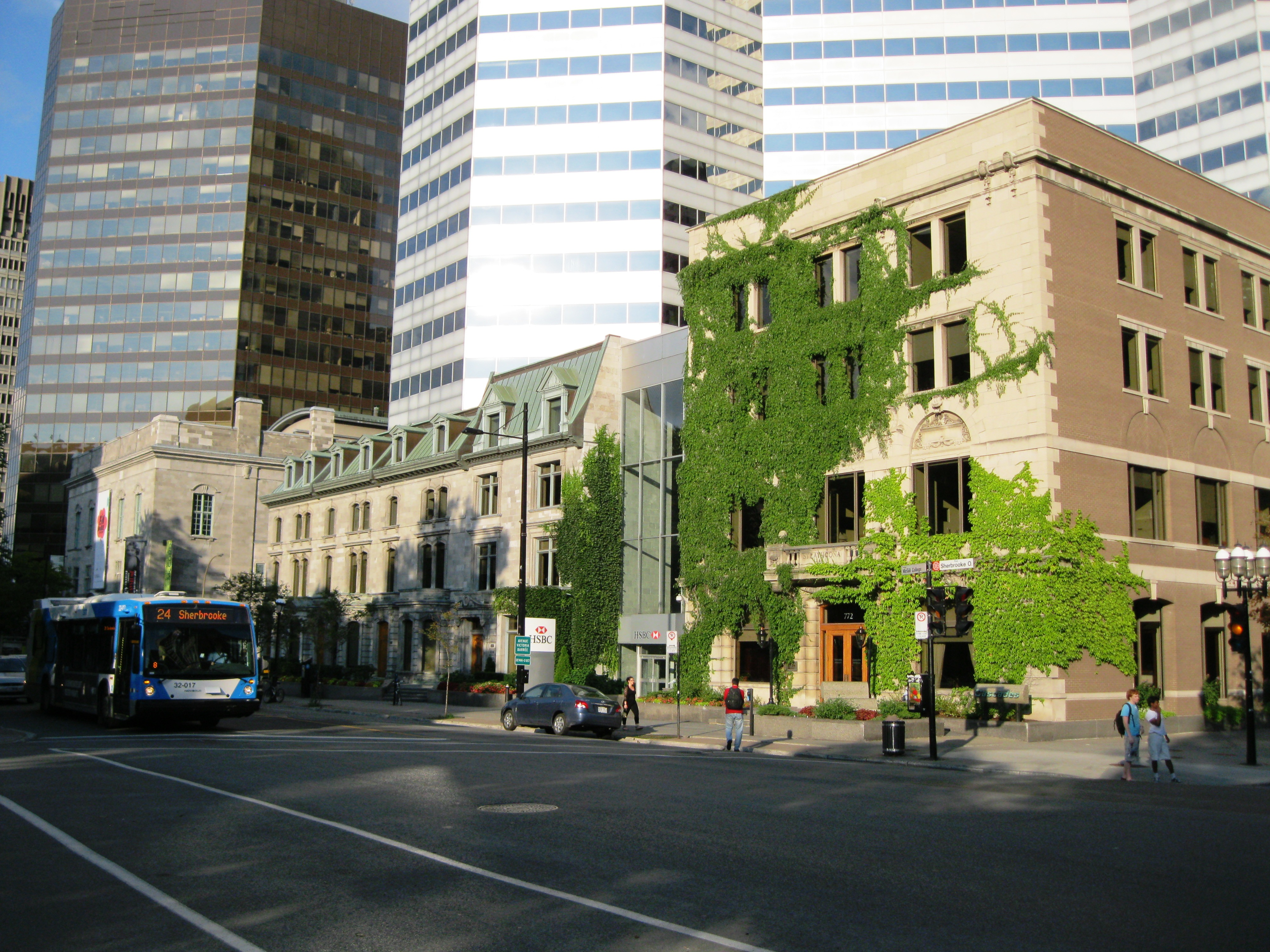
Houses on Sherbrooke Street West

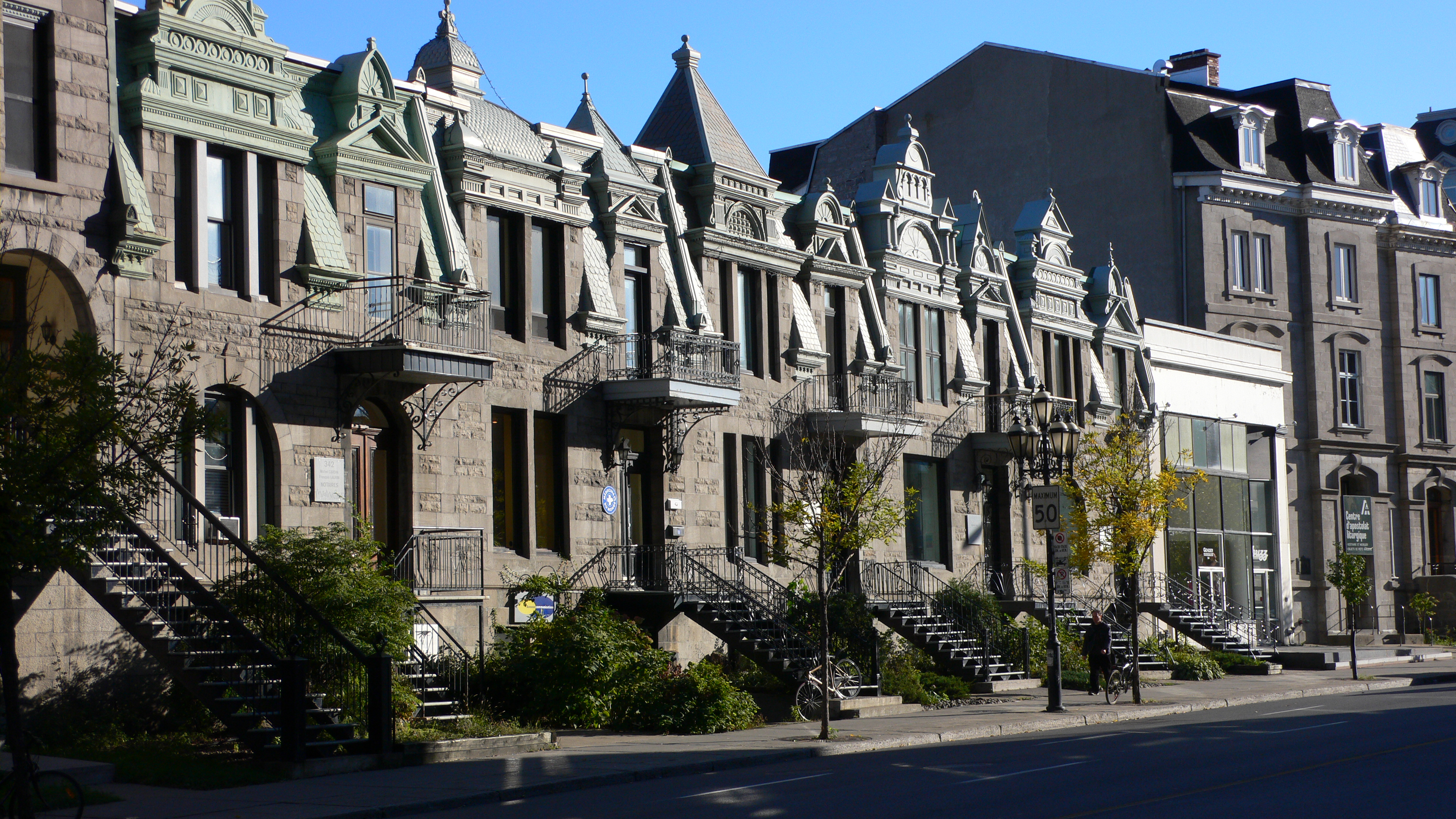
Houses on Sherbrooke Street East

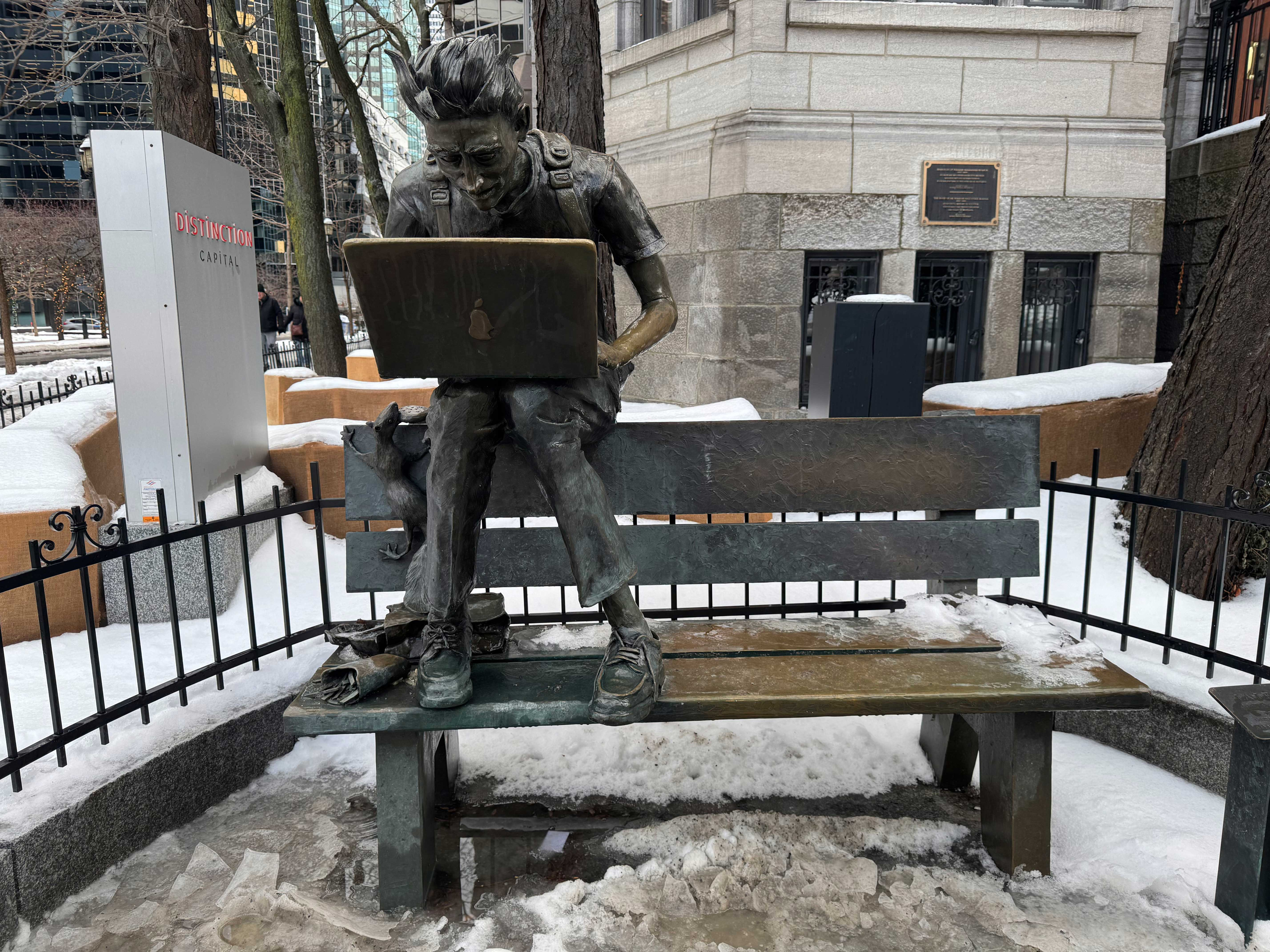
Bronze sculpture titled "La Leçon" ("The Lesson") at 888 Sherbrooke Street West, opposite Roddick Gates of McGill University
