= Montreal =

Largest city in Quebec, Canada

Montreal Montréal (French)
- City
- Ville de Montréal (French)
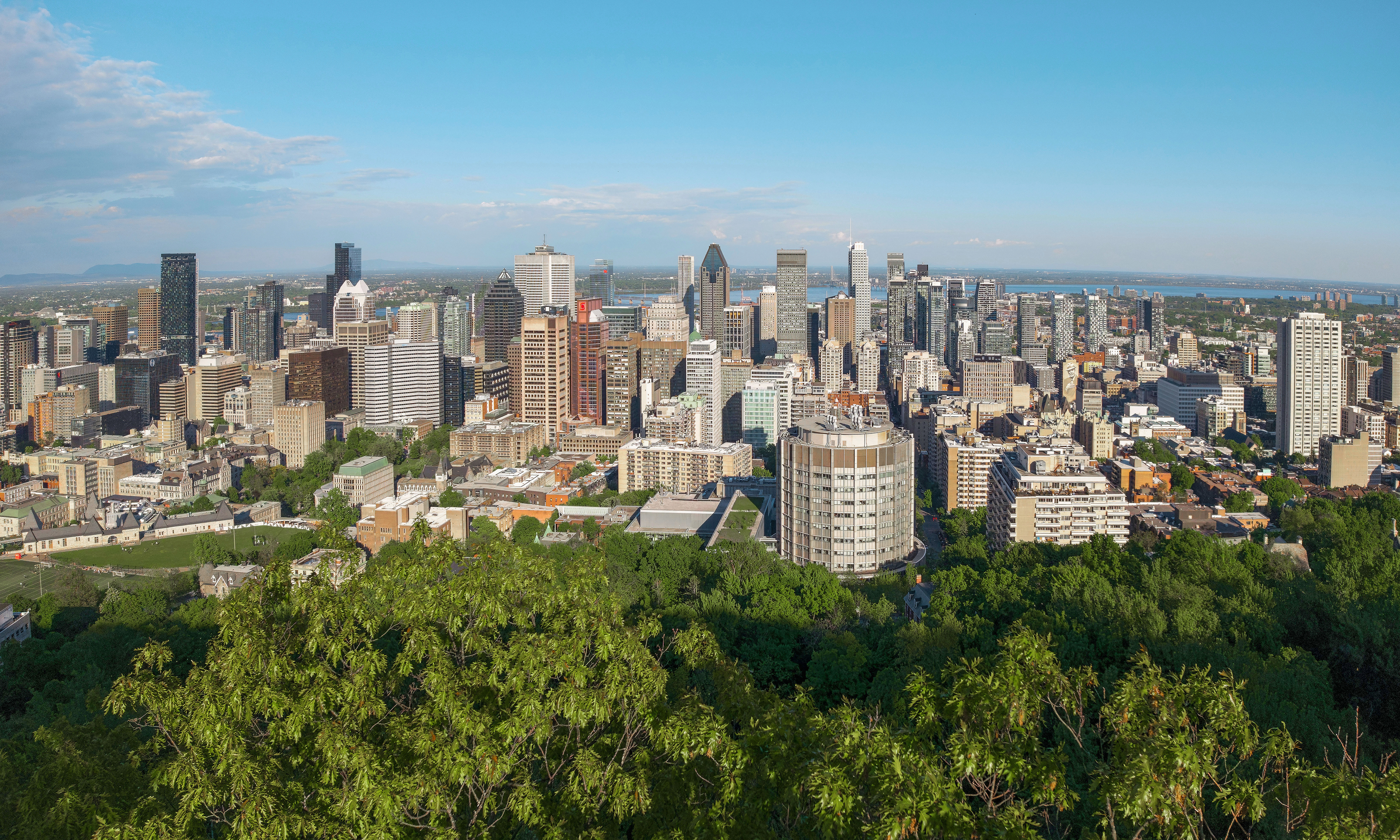
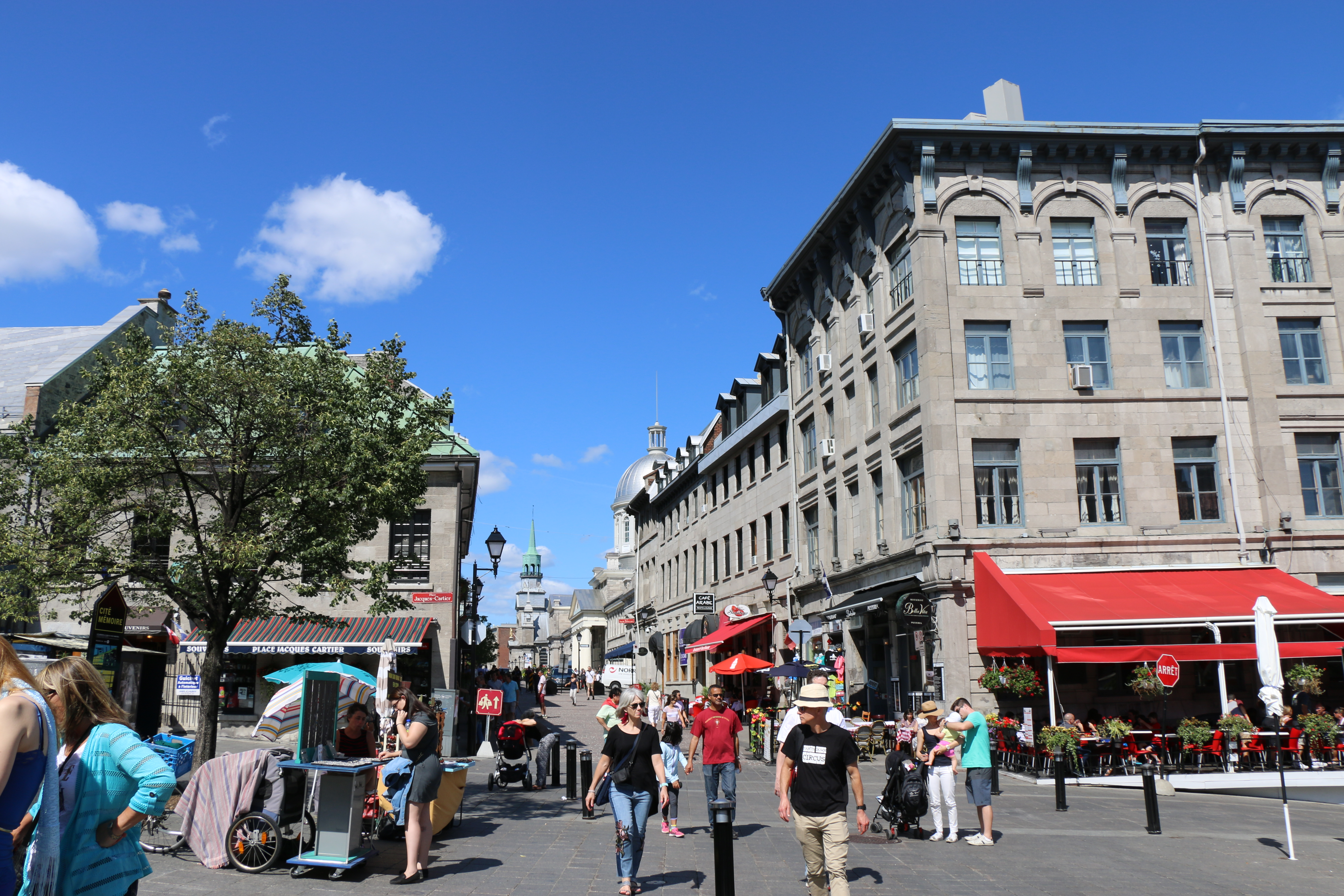
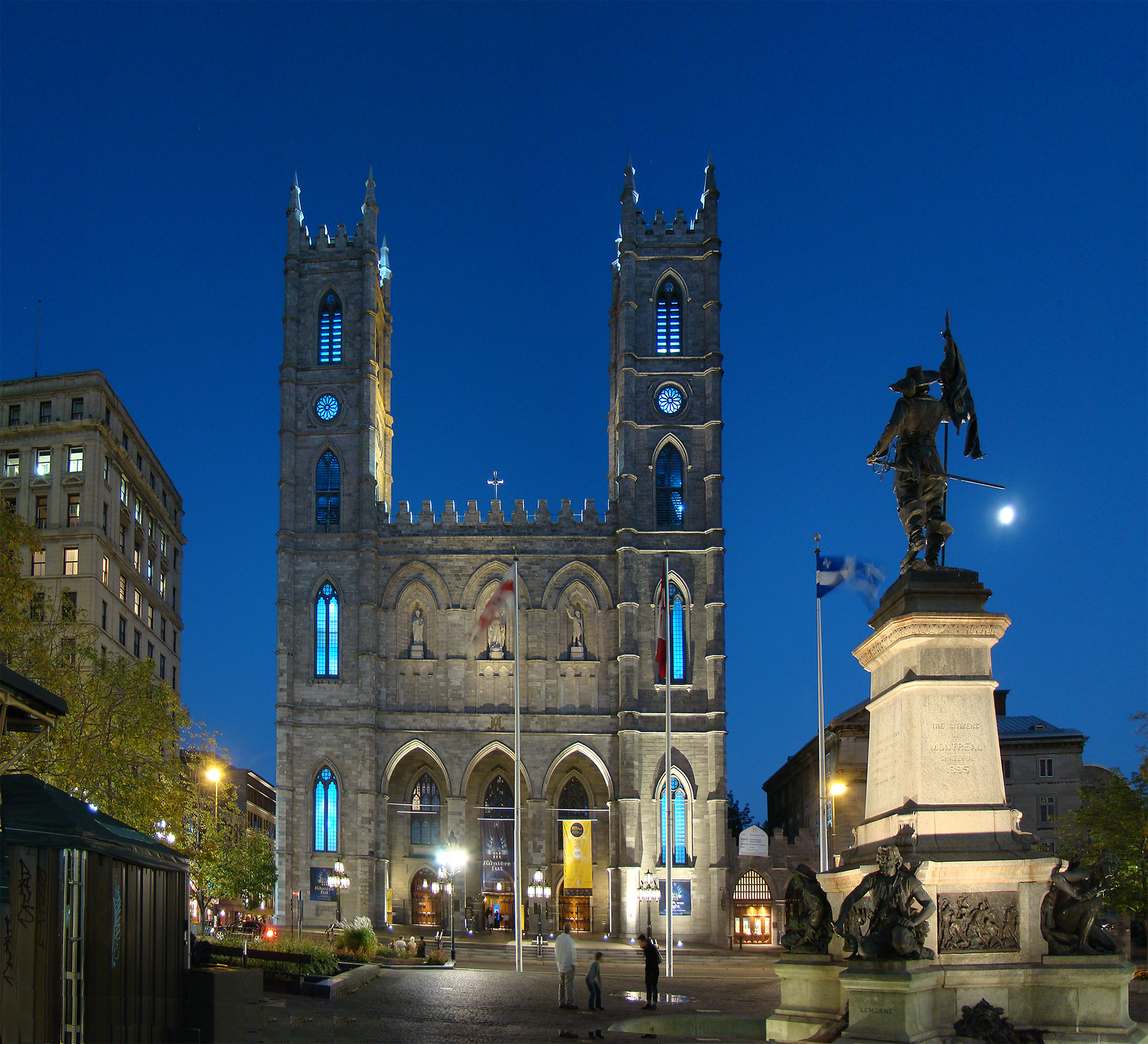
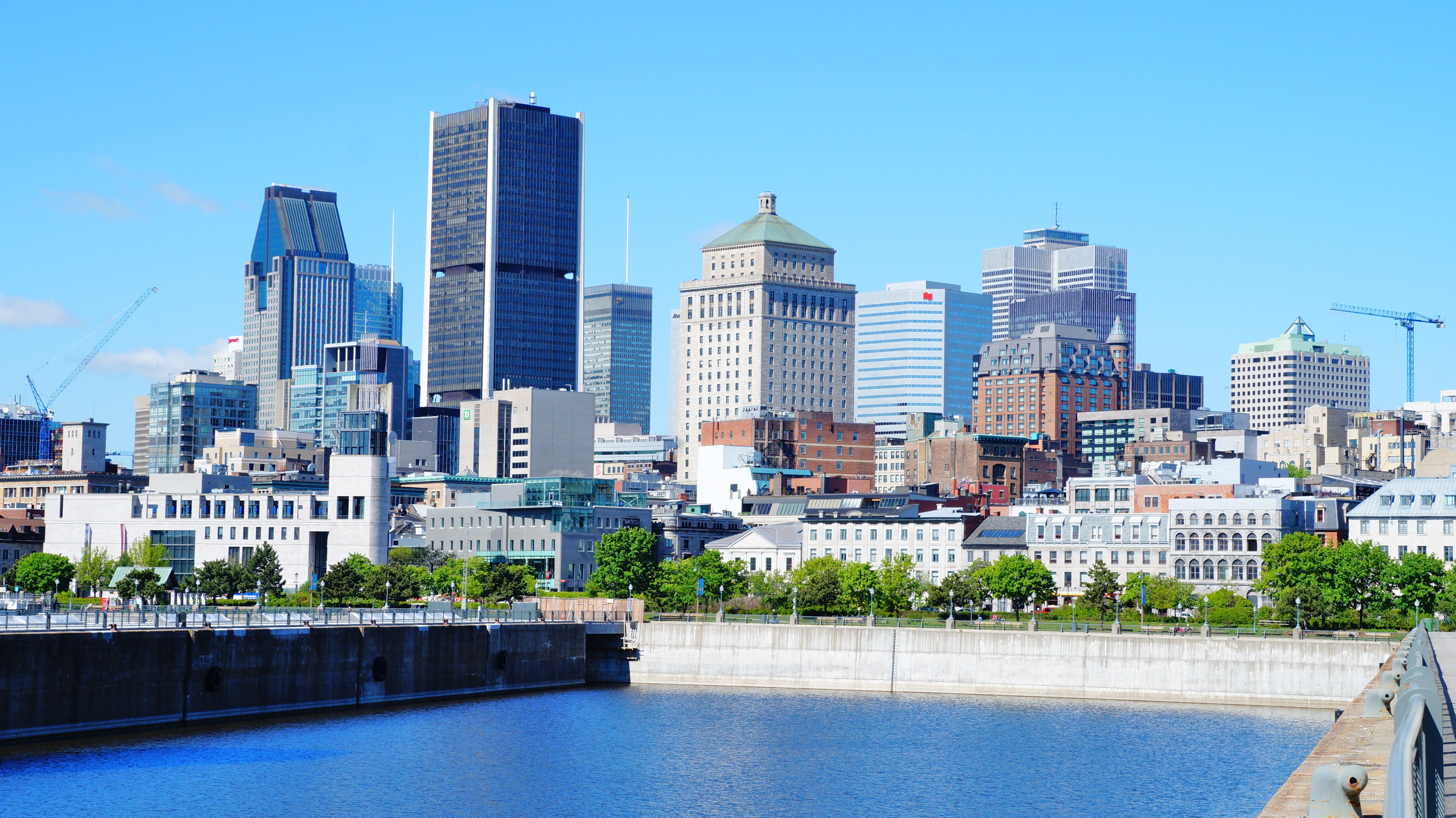
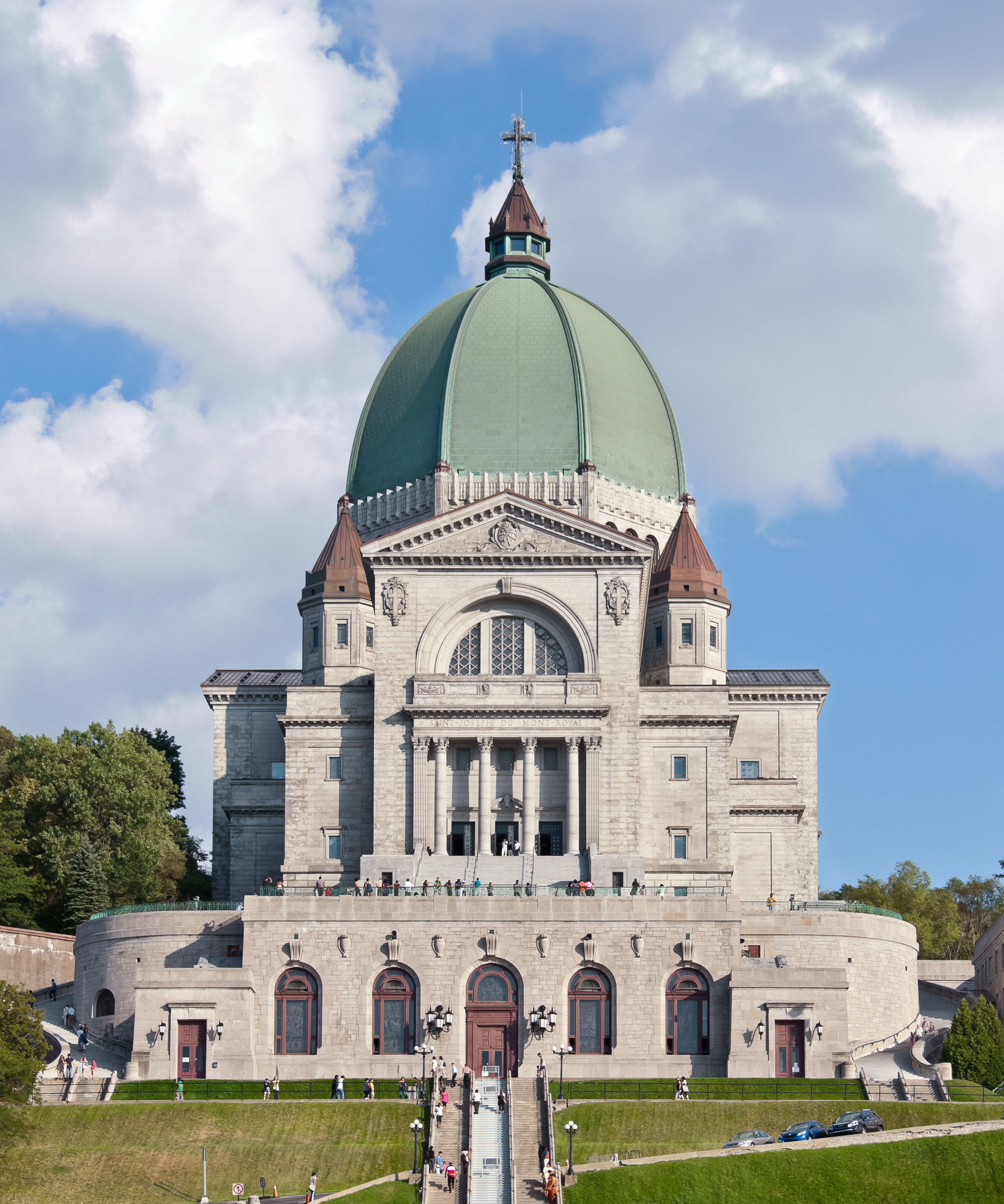
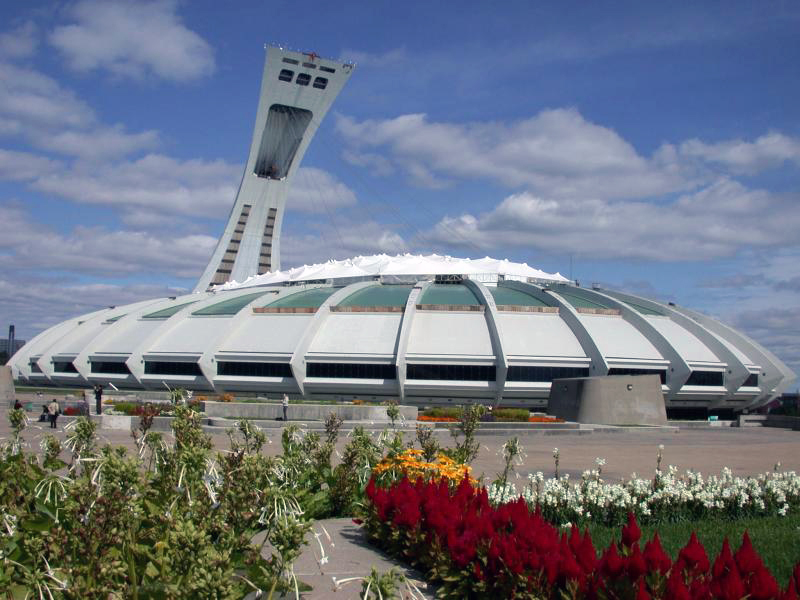
- Skyline of Downtown Montreal Old Montreal Notre-Dame Basilica Old Port of Montreal Saint Joseph's Oratory Olympic Stadium

- Flag Coat of arms Logo
- Nicknames: "MTL", "The 514", "The City of Festivals", "The City of Saints", "The City of a Hundred Steeples", "Sin City", "La Métropole"
- Motto: Concordia Salus ("well-being through harmony")
- Interactive map of Montreal
- Location within Canada Location within Quebec Location within North America
- Coordinates: 45°30′32″N 73°33′15″W
- Country: Canada
- Province: Quebec
- Region / Urban agglomeration: Montreal
- Founded: May 17, 1642; 384 years ago
- Incorporated: 1832; 194 years ago
- Constituted: January 1, 2002; 24 years ago
- Named for: Mount Royal
- Boroughs: List: Ahuntsic-Cartierville; Anjou; Côte-des-Neiges–Notre-Dame-de-Grâce; L'Île-Bizard–Sainte-Geneviève; LaSalle; Lachine; Le Plateau-Mont-Royal; Le Sud-Ouest; Mercier–Hochelaga-Maisonneuve; Montréal-Nord; Outremont; Pierrefonds-Roxboro; Rivière-des-Prairies–Pointe-aux-Trembles; Rosemont–La Petite-Patrie; Saint-Laurent; Saint-Léonard; Verdun; Ville-Marie; Villeray–Saint-Michel–Parc-Extension

Government
  - Type: Mayor–council
  - Body: Montreal City Council
  - Mayor: Soraya Martinez Ferrada
  - Federal riding: List: Ahuntsic-Cartierville; Bourassa; Dorval—Lachine—LaSalle; Hochelaga; Honoré-Mercier; La Pointe-de-l'Île; Lac-Saint-Louis; LaSalle—Émard—Verdun; Laurier—Sainte-Marie; Mount Royal; Notre-Dame-de-Grâce—Westmount; Outremont; Papineau; Pierrefonds—Dollard; Rosemont—La Petite-Patrie; Saint-Laurent; Saint-Léonard—Saint-Michel; Ville-Marie—Le Sud-Ouest—Île-des-Sœurs
  - Provincial riding: List: Acadie; Anjou–Louis-Riel; Bourassa-Sauvé; Camille-Laurin; Crémazie; D'Arcy-McGee; Gouin; Hochelaga-Maisonneuve; Jeanne-Mance–Viger; LaFontaine; Laurier-Dorion; Marguerite-Bourgeoys; Marquette; Mercier; Mont-Royal; Nelligan; Notre-Dame-de-Grâce; Outremont; Pointe-aux-Trembles; Robert-Baldwin; Rosemont; Saint-Henri–Sainte-Anne; Saint-Laurent; Sainte-Marie–Saint-Jacques; Tétreaultville; Verdun; Viau; Westmount–Saint-Louis
  - MPs: List of MPs: Sameer Zuberi; Mario Beaulieu; Alexandre Boulerice; Soraya Martinez Ferrada; Anju Dhillon; Patricia Lattanzio; Emmanuel Dubourg; Marc Garneau; Anthony Housefather; Mélanie Joly; Emmanuella Lambropoulos; David Lametti; Steven Guilbeault; Marc Miller; Pablo Rodríguez; Francis Scarpaleggia; Marjorie Michel; Rachel Bendayan

Area (2021)
  - Land: 364.74 km^{2} (140.83 sq mi)
  - Population centre: 1,382.47 km^{2} (533.77 sq mi)
  - Census metropolitan area: 4,670.10 km^{2} (1,803.14 sq mi)
- Highest elevation: 233 m (764 ft)
- Lowest elevation: 6 m (20 ft)

Population (2021)
  - Total: 1,762,949 (2nd)
  - Density: 4,833.5/km^{2} (12,519/sq mi)
  - PC: 3,675,219 (2nd)
  - PC density: 2,658.5/km^{2} (6,885/sq mi)
  - CMA: 4,291,732 (2nd)
  - CMA density: 919/km^{2} (2,380/sq mi)
- Demonyms: Montrealer; Montréalais(e)

GDP (Nominal, 2021)
  - CMA: CA$253.9 billion (US$203.12 billion)
  - Per capita: CA$58,636 (US$46,908.8)
- Time zone: UTC– 05:00 (EST)
  - Summer (DST): UTC– 04:00 (EDT)
- Postal codes: H: H1A, H1C-H3N, H3S-H3W, H4A-H4T, H4Z-H5B, H8R-H8Z, H9C-H9E, H9H, H9K
- Area codes: 514, 438 and 263
- Police: SPVM
- Website: montreal.ca

Montreal (Note: Canadian English: /ˌmʌntriˈɔːl/ MUN-tree-AWL or /ˌmɒn-/ MON-.) (French: Montréal) (Note: French pronunciation: [mɔ̃ʁeal].) is the largest city in the province of Quebec, the second-largest in Canada, and the eighth-largest in North America. Founded in 1642 as Ville-Marie, or "City of Mary", it now takes its name from Mount Royal, the triple-peaked mountain around which the early settlement was built. The city is centred on the Island of Montreal and several much smaller, peripheral islands, the largest of which is Île Bizard. It lies 196 kilometres (122 mi) east of the national capital, Ottawa, and 258 kilometres (160 mi) southwest of the provincial capital, Quebec City.

As of the 2021 Canadian census, the city had a population of 1,762,949 and a metropolitan population of 4,291,732, making it the second-largest metropolitan area in Canada after Toronto. French is the city's official language. In 2021, 85.7% of the population of the city of Montreal considered themselves fluent in French while 90.2% could speak it in the metropolitan area. Montreal is one of the most bilingual cities in Quebec and Canada, with 58.5% of the population able to speak both French and English. Montreal is the largest primarily French speaking city in the Americas.

Historically the commercial capital of Canada, Montreal was surpassed in population and economic strength by Toronto in the 1970s. It remains an important centre of art, culture, literature, film and television, music, commerce, aerospace, transport, finance, pharmaceuticals, technology, design, education, tourism, food, fashion, video game development, and world affairs. Montreal is the location of the headquarters of the International Civil Aviation Organization, and was named a UNESCO City of Design in 2006. In 2018, Montreal was ranked as a global city.

Montreal has hosted numerous important international events, including the 1967 International and Universal Exposition, and is the only Canadian city to have hosted the Summer Olympics, having done so in 1976. The city hosts the Canadian Grand Prix of Formula One; the Montreal International Jazz Festival, the largest jazz festival in the world; the Just for Laughs festival, the largest comedy festival in the world; and Les Francos de Montréal, the largest French-language music festival in the world. In sports, it is home to multiple professional teams, most notably the Canadiens of the National Hockey League, who have won the Stanley Cup a record 24 times.

== Etymology and original names ==
In the Ojibwe language, the land is called Mooniyaang or Moon’yaang which was "the first stopping place" in the Ojibwe migration story as related in the seven fires prophecy.

In the Mohawk language, the land is called Tiohtià:ke. This is an abbreviation of Teionihtiohtiá:kon, which loosely translates as "where the group divided/parted ways".

French settlers from La Flèche in the Loire Valley first named their new town, founded in 1642, Ville Marie ("City of Mary"), named for the Virgin Mary.

The current form of the name, Montréal, is generally thought to be derived from Mount Royal (Mont Royal in French), the triple-peaked hill in the heart of the city. There are multiple explanations for how Mont Royal became Montréal. In 16th-century French, the forms réal and royal were used interchangeably, so Montréal could simply be a variant of Mont Royal. In the second explanation, the name came from an Italian translation. Venetian geographer Giovanni Battista Ramusio used the name Monte Real to designate Mount Royal in his 1556 map of the region. However, this explanation is disputed by the Commission de toponymie du Québec.

In English, the accent mark is often omitted (Montreal); however, officially, the name includes the accent mark (Montréal), (Note: As can be seen on the official website) even though English rarely uses diacritical marks.

François de Belleforest was the first to use the form Montréal with reference to the entire region in 1575.

== History ==
=== Pre-European contact ===
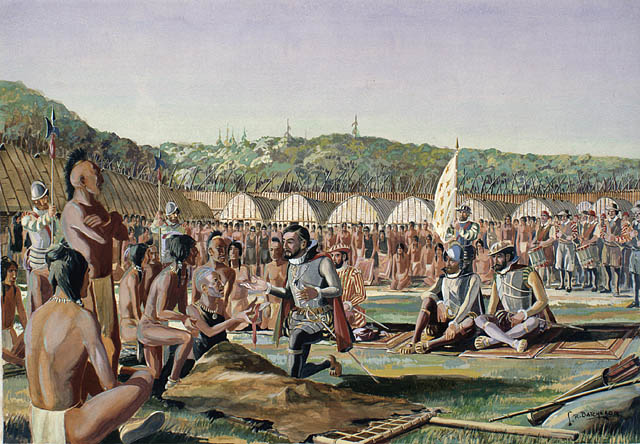
Jacques Cartier at Hochelaga. Arriving in 1535, Cartier was the first European to visit the area.

Archaeological evidence in the region indicates that First Nations native people occupied the island of Montreal as early as 4,000 years ago. By the year AD 1000, they had started to cultivate maize. Within a few hundred years, they had built fortified villages. The Saint Lawrence Iroquoians, an ethnically and culturally distinct group from the Iroquois nations of the Haudenosaunee (then based in present-day New York), established the village of Hochelaga at the foot of Mount Royal two centuries before the French arrived. Archeologists have found evidence of their habitation there and at other locations in the valley since at least the 14th century. The French explorer Jacques Cartier visited Hochelaga on October 2, 1535, and estimated the population of the native people at Hochelaga to be "over a thousand people".

=== Early European settlement (1600–1760) ===
In 1603, French explorer Samuel de Champlain reported that the St Lawrence Iroquoians and their settlements had disappeared altogether from the St Lawrence valley. This is believed to be due to outmigration, epidemics of European diseases, or intertribal wars. In 1611, Champlain established a fur trading post on the Island of Montreal on a site initially named La Place Royale. At the confluence of Petite Riviere and St. Lawrence River, it is where present-day Pointe-à-Callière stands. On his 1616 map, Champlain named the island Lille de Villemenon in honour of the sieur de Villemenon, a French dignitary who was seeking the viceroyship of New France. In 1639, Jérôme Le Royer de La Dauversière obtained the Seigneurial title to the Island of Montreal in the name of the Notre Dame Society of Montreal to establish a Roman Catholic mission to evangelize natives.

Dauversière hired Paul Chomedey de Maisonneuve, then age 30, to lead a group of colonists to build a mission on his new seigneury. The colonists left France in 1641 for Quebec and arrived on the island the following year. On May 17, 1642, Ville-Marie was founded on the southern shore of Montreal island, with Maisonneuve as its first governor. The settlement included a chapel and a hospital, under the command of Jeanne Mance. By 1643, Ville-Marie had come under Iroquois raids. In 1652, Maisonneuve returned to France to raise 100 volunteers to bolster the colonial population. If the effort had failed, Montreal was to be abandoned and the survivors re-located downriver to Quebec City. Before these 100 arrived in the fall of 1653, the population of Montreal was barely 50 people.

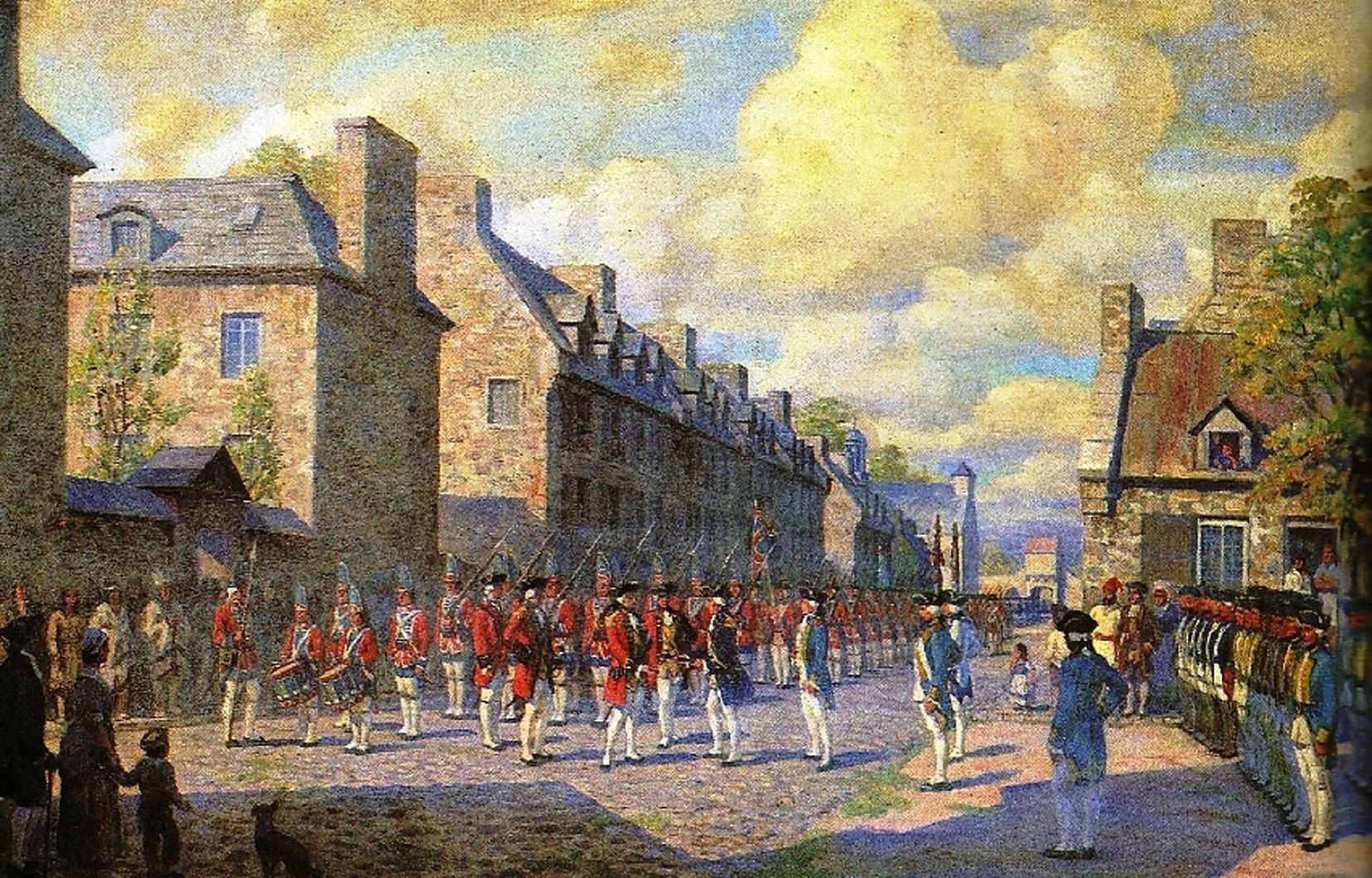
French authorities surrender the city of Montreal to the British after the Articles of Capitulation was signed in 1760.

By 1685, Ville-Marie was home to some 600 colonists, most of them living in modest wooden houses. Ville-Marie became a centre for the fur trade and a base for further exploration. In 1689, the English-allied Iroquois attacked Lachine on the Island of Montreal, committing the worst massacre in the history of New France. By the early 18th century, the Sulpician Order was established there. To encourage French settlement, it wanted the Mohawk to move away from the fur trading post at Ville-Marie. It had a mission village, known as Kahnewake, south of the St. Lawrence River. The fathers persuaded some Mohawk to make a new settlement at their former hunting grounds north of the Ottawa River. This became Kanesatake. In 1745, several Mohawk families moved upriver to create another settlement, known as Akwesasne. All three are now Mohawk reserves in Canada. The Canadian territory was ruled as a French colony until 1760, when Montreal fell to a British offensive during the Seven Years' War. The colony then surrendered to Great Britain.

Ville-Marie was the name for the settlement that appeared in all official documents until 1705, when Montreal appeared for the first time, although people referred to the "Island of Montreal" long before then.

=== American occupation (1775–1776) ===
As part of the American Revolution, the invasion of Quebec resulted after Benedict Arnold captured Fort Ticonderoga in present-day upstate New York in May 1775 as a launching point to Arnold's invasion of Quebec in September. While Arnold approached the Plains of Abraham, Montreal fell to American forces led by Richard Montgomery on November 13, 1775, after it was abandoned by Guy Carleton. After Arnold withdrew from Quebec City to Pointe-aux-Trembles on November 19, Montgomery's forces left Montreal on December 1 and arrived there on December 3 to plot to attack Quebec City, with Montgomery leaving David Wooster in charge of the city. Montgomery was killed in the failed attack and Arnold, who had taken command, sent Brigadier General Moses Hazen to inform Wooster of the defeat.

Wooster left Hazen in command on March 20, 1776, as he left to replace Arnold in leading further attacks on Quebec City. On April 19, Arnold arrived in Montreal to take over command from Hazen, who remained as his second-in-command. Hazen sent Colonel Timothy Bedel to form a garrison of 390 men 40 miles upriver in a garrison at Les Cèdres, Quebec, to defend Montreal against the British army. In the Battle of the Cedars, Bedel's lieutenant Isaac Butterfield surrendered to George Forster.

Forster advanced to Fort Senneville on May 23. By May 24, Arnold was entrenched in Montreal's borough of Lachine. Forster initially approached Lachine, then withdrew to Quinze-Chênes. Arnold's forces then abandoned Lachine to chase Forster. The Americans burned Senneville on May 26. After Arnold crossed the Ottawa River in pursuit of Forster, Forster's cannons repelled Arnold's forces. Forster negotiated a prisoner exchange with Henry Sherburne and Isaac Butterfield, resulting in a May 27 boating of their deputy Lieutenant Park being returned to the Americans. Arnold and Forster negotiated further and more American prisoners were returned to Arnold at Sainte-Anne-de-Bellevue, Quebec, ("Fort Anne") on May 30 (delayed two days by wind).

Arnold eventually withdrew his forces back to the New York fort of Ticonderoga by the summer. On June 15, Arnold's messenger approaching Sorel spotted Carleton returning with a fleet of ships and notified him. Arnold's forces abandoned Montreal (attempting to burn it down in the process) prior to the June 17 arrival of Carleton's fleet.

The Americans did not return British prisoners in exchange, as previously agreed, due to accusations of abuse, with Congress repudiating the agreement at the protest of George Washington. Arnold blamed Colonel Timothy Bedel for the defeat, removing him and Lieutenant Butterfield from command and sending them to Sorel for court-martial. The retreat of the American army delayed their court martial until August 1, 1776, when they were convicted and cashiered at Ticonderoga. Bedel was given a new commission by Congress in October 1777 after Arnold was assigned to defend Rhode Island in July 1777.

=== Modern history as city (1832–present) ===
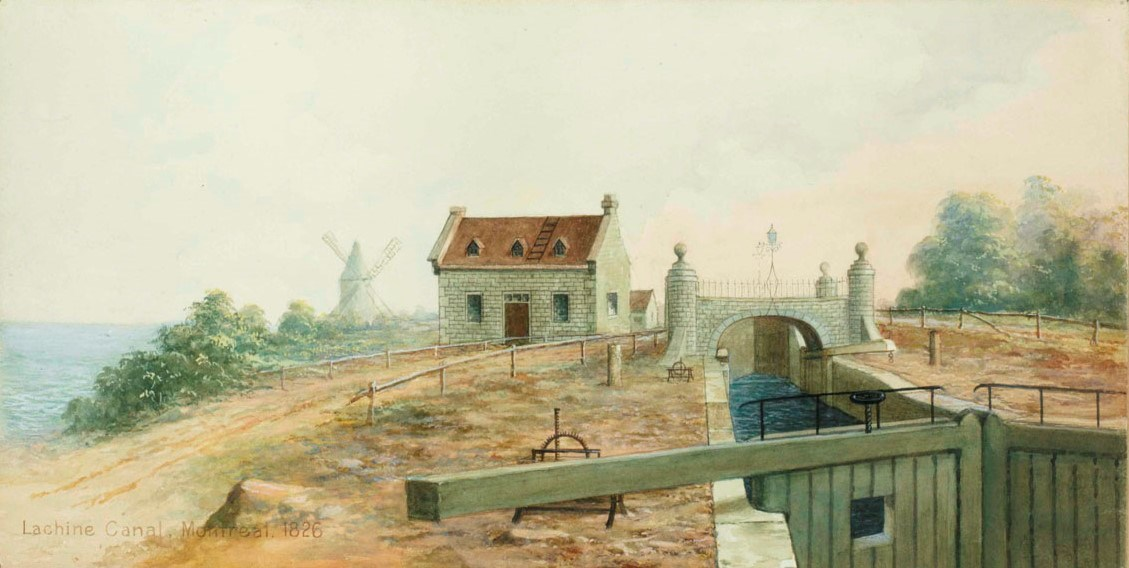
View of Lachine Canal in 1826, a year after it opened. It bypassed the rapids west of the city, linking Montreal with other continental markets.

Montreal was incorporated as a city in 1832. The opening of the Lachine Canal permitted ships to bypass the unnavigable Lachine Rapids, while the construction of the Victoria Bridge established Montreal as a major railway hub. The leaders of Montreal's business community started to build their homes in the Golden Square Mile from about 1850. By 1860, it was the largest city under British rule in North America, culturally and economically dominating the rest of Canada.

In the 19th century, maintaining Montreal's drinking water became increasingly difficult with the rapid increase in population. A majority of the drinking water was still coming from the city's harbour, which was busy and heavily trafficked, leading to the deterioration of the water within. In the mid-1840s, the City of Montreal installed a water system that would pump water from the St. Lawrence and into cisterns. The cisterns would then be transported to the desired location. This was not the first water system of its type in Montreal, as there had been one in private ownership since 1801. In the middle of the 19th century, water distribution was carried out by "fontainiers". The fountainiers would open and close water valves outside of buildings, as directed, all over the city. As they lacked modern plumbing systems it was impossible to connect all buildings at once and it also acted as a conservation method. However, the population was not finished rising — it rose from 58,000 in 1852 to 267,000 by 1901.

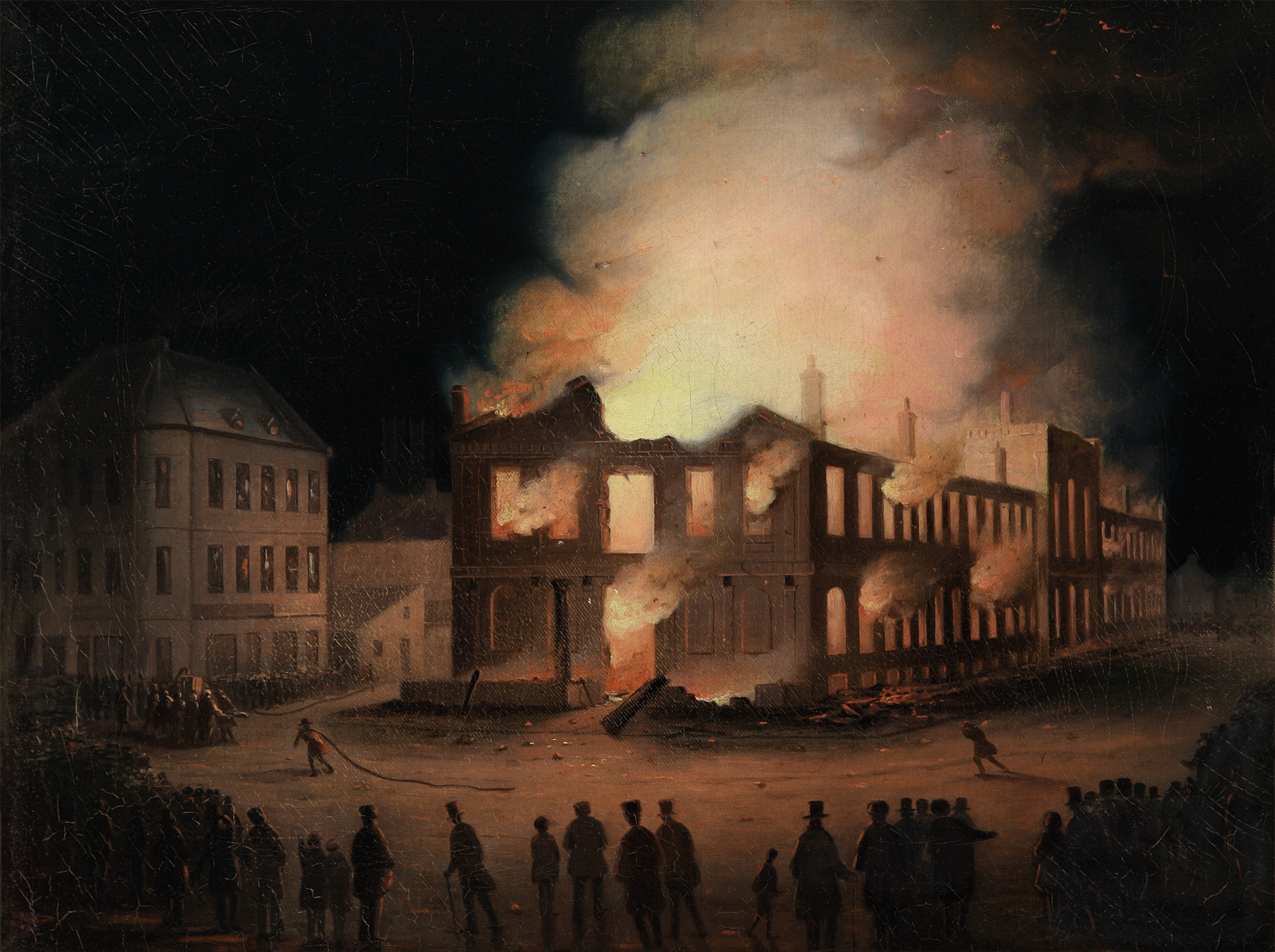
Political protests from Tories led to the burning of the Parliament Buildings in Montreal in 1849.

Montreal was the capital of the Province of Canada from 1844 to 1849, but lost its status when a Tory mob burnt down the Parliament building to protest the passage of the Rebellion Losses Bill. Thereafter, the capital rotated between Quebec City and Toronto until in 1857, Queen Victoria herself established Ottawa as the capital due to strategic reasons. The reasons were twofold. First, because it was located more in the interior of the Province of Canada, it was less susceptible to attack from the United States. Second, and perhaps more importantly, because it lay on the border between French and English Canada, Ottawa was seen as a compromise between Montreal, Toronto, Kingston and Quebec City, which were all vying to become the young nation's official capital. Ottawa retained the status as capital of Canada when the Province of Canada joined with Nova Scotia and New Brunswick to form the Dominion of Canada in 1867.

An internment camp was set up at Immigration Hall in Montreal from August 1914 to November 1918.

After World War I, the prohibition movement in the United States led to Montreal becoming a destination for Americans looking for alcohol. Unemployment remained high in the city and was exacerbated by the Stock Market Crash of 1929 and the Great Depression.

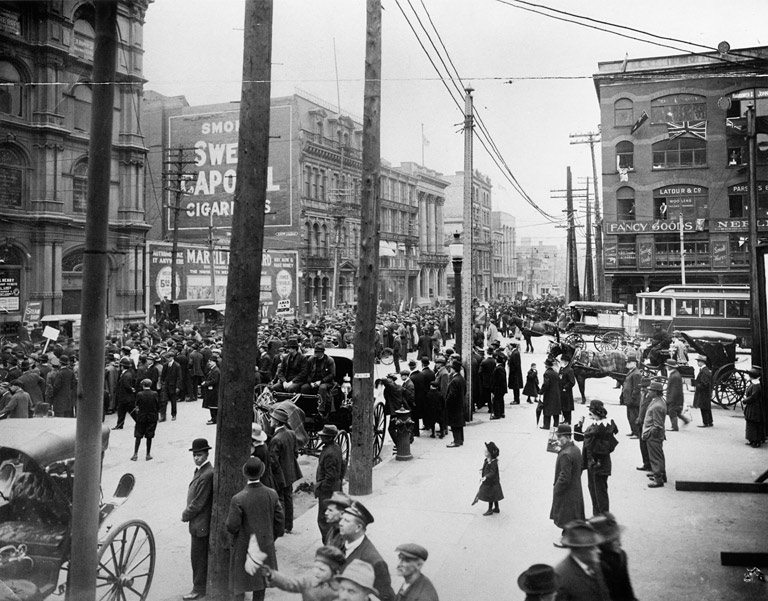
An anti-conscription rally in Montreal, 1917. During both World Wars, the city saw protest against the implementation of conscription.

During World War II, Mayor Camillien Houde protested against conscription and urged Montrealers to disobey the federal government's registry of all men and women. The federal government, part of the Allied states, was furious over Houde's stand and held him in a prison camp until 1944. That year, the government decided to institute conscription to expand the armed forces and fight the Axis powers. (See Conscription Crisis of 1944.)

Montreal was the official residence of the Luxembourg royal family in exile during World War II.

By 1951, Montreal's population had surpassed one million. However, Toronto's growth had begun challenging Montreal's status as the economic capital of Canada. Indeed, the volume of stocks traded at the Toronto Stock Exchange had already surpassed that traded at the Montreal Stock Exchange in the 1940s. The St. Lawrence Seaway opened in 1959, allowing vessels to bypass Montreal. In time, this development led to the end of the city's economic dominance as businesses moved to other areas. During the 1960s, there was continued growth as Canada's tallest skyscrapers, new expressways and the subway system known as the Montreal Metro were finished during this time. Montreal also held the World's Fair of 1967, better known as Expo67.

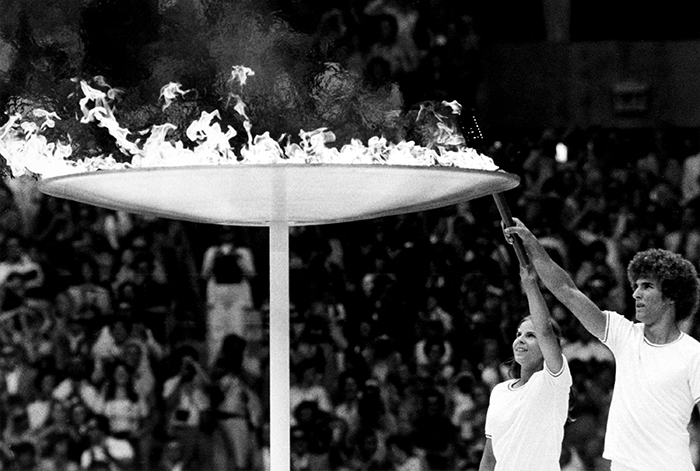
Lighting of the Olympic Torch inside Montreal's Olympic Stadium. The city hosted the 1976 Summer Olympics.

The 1970s ushered in a period of wide-ranging social and political changes, stemming largely from the concerns of the French-speaking majority about the conservation of their culture and language, given the traditional predominance of the English Canadian minority in the business arena. The October Crisis and the 1976 election of the Parti Québécois, which supported sovereign status for Quebec, resulted in the departure of many businesses and people from the city. In 1976, Montreal hosted the Summer Olympics. While the event brought the city international prestige and attention, the Olympic Stadium built for the event resulted in massive debt for the city. During the 1980s and early 1990s, Montreal experienced a slower rate of economic growth than many other major Canadian cities. Montreal was the site of the 1989 École Polytechnique massacre, one of Canada's worst mass shootings, where 25-year-old Marc Lépine shot and killed 14 people, all of them women, and wounded 14 other people before shooting himself at École Polytechnique.

Montreal was merged with the 27 surrounding municipalities on the Island of Montreal on January 1, 2002, creating a unified city encompassing the entire island. There was substantial resistance from the suburbs to the merger, with the perception being that it was forced on the mostly English suburbs by the Parti Québécois. As expected, this move proved unpopular and several mergers were later rescinded. Several former municipalities, totalling 13% of the population of the island, voted to leave the unified city in separate referendums in June 2004. The demerger took place on January 1, 2006, leaving 15 municipalities on the island, including Montreal. Demerged municipalities remain affiliated with the city through an agglomeration council that collects taxes from them to pay for numerous shared services. The 2002 mergers were not the first in the city's history. Montreal annexed 27 other cities, towns and villages beginning with Hochelaga in 1883, with the last prior to 2002 being Pointe-aux-Trembles in 1982.

The Montreal Skyline in 2019

The 21st century has brought with it a revival of the city's economic and cultural landscape. Helping Montreal continue to grow are: the construction of new residential skyscrapers, two super-hospitals (the Centre hospitalier de l'Université de Montréal and McGill University Health Centre), the creation of the Quartier des Spectacles, reconstruction of the Turcot Interchange, reconfiguration of the Decarie and Dorval interchanges, construction of the new Réseau express métropolitain, gentrification of Griffintown, subway line extensions and the purchase of new subway cars, the complete revitalization and expansion of Trudeau International Airport, the completion of Quebec Autoroute 30, the reconstruction of the Champlain Bridge and the construction of a new toll bridge to Laval.

== Geography ==
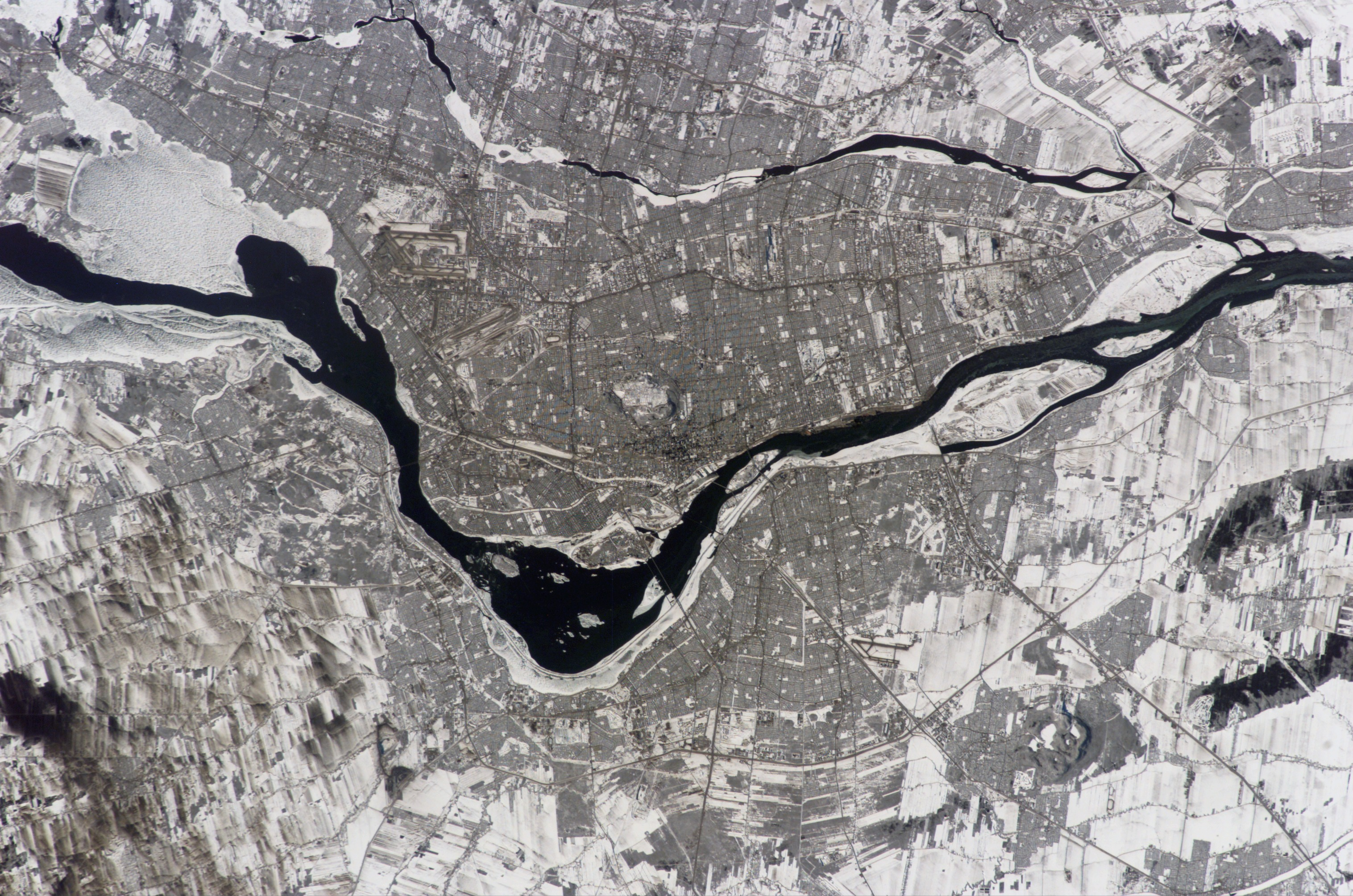
The island of Montreal at the confluence of the Saint Lawrence and Ottawa rivers

Montreal is in the southwest of the province of Quebec. The city covers most of the Island of Montreal at the confluence of the Saint Lawrence and Ottawa Rivers. The port of Montreal lies at one end of the Saint Lawrence Seaway, the river gateway that stretches from the Great Lakes to the Atlantic. Montreal is defined by its location between the Saint Lawrence river to its south and the Rivière des Prairies to its north. The city is named after the most prominent geographical feature on the island, a three-head mountain called Mount Royal, topped at 232 metres (761 ft) above sea level.

Montreal is at the centre of the Montreal Metropolitan Community, and is bordered by the city of Laval to the north; Longueuil, Saint-Lambert, Brossard, and other municipalities to the south; Repentigny to the east and the West Island municipalities to the west. The enclaves of Westmount, Montreal West, Hampstead, Côte Saint-Luc, and the Town of Mount Royal are all surrounded by Montreal, while Montreal East is surrounded by Montreal on three sides.

=== Climate ===
Montreal

Climate chart (precipitation, max. and min. temperature)
J	F	M	A	M	J	J	A	S	O	N	D
86 −5 −14	66 −3 −12	77 2 −7	90 11 1	86 19 8	84 24 14	91 27 17	94 26 16	89 21 11	103 13 5	84 6 −2	92 −1 −9
- █ Average max. and min. temperatures in °C
- █ Precipitation totals in mm
- Source: Environment Canada
Imperial conversion
J	F	M	A	M	J	J	A	S	O	N	D
3.4 23 8	2.6 26 10	3 36 20	3.5 52 34	3.4 67 47	3.3 76 57	3.6 80 62	3.7 78 60	3.5 70 52	4.1 56 40	3.3 43 29	3.6 30 16
- █ Average max. and min. temperatures in °F
- █ Precipitation totals in inches

Montreal is classified as a hot-summer and warm-summer humid continental climate (Köppen climate classification: Dfa and Dfb). Summers are hot and humid with a daily maximum average of 26 to 27 °C (79 to 81 °F) in July; temperatures in excess of 30 °C (86 °F) are common. Conversely, cold fronts can bring crisp, drier and windy weather in the early and later parts of summer.

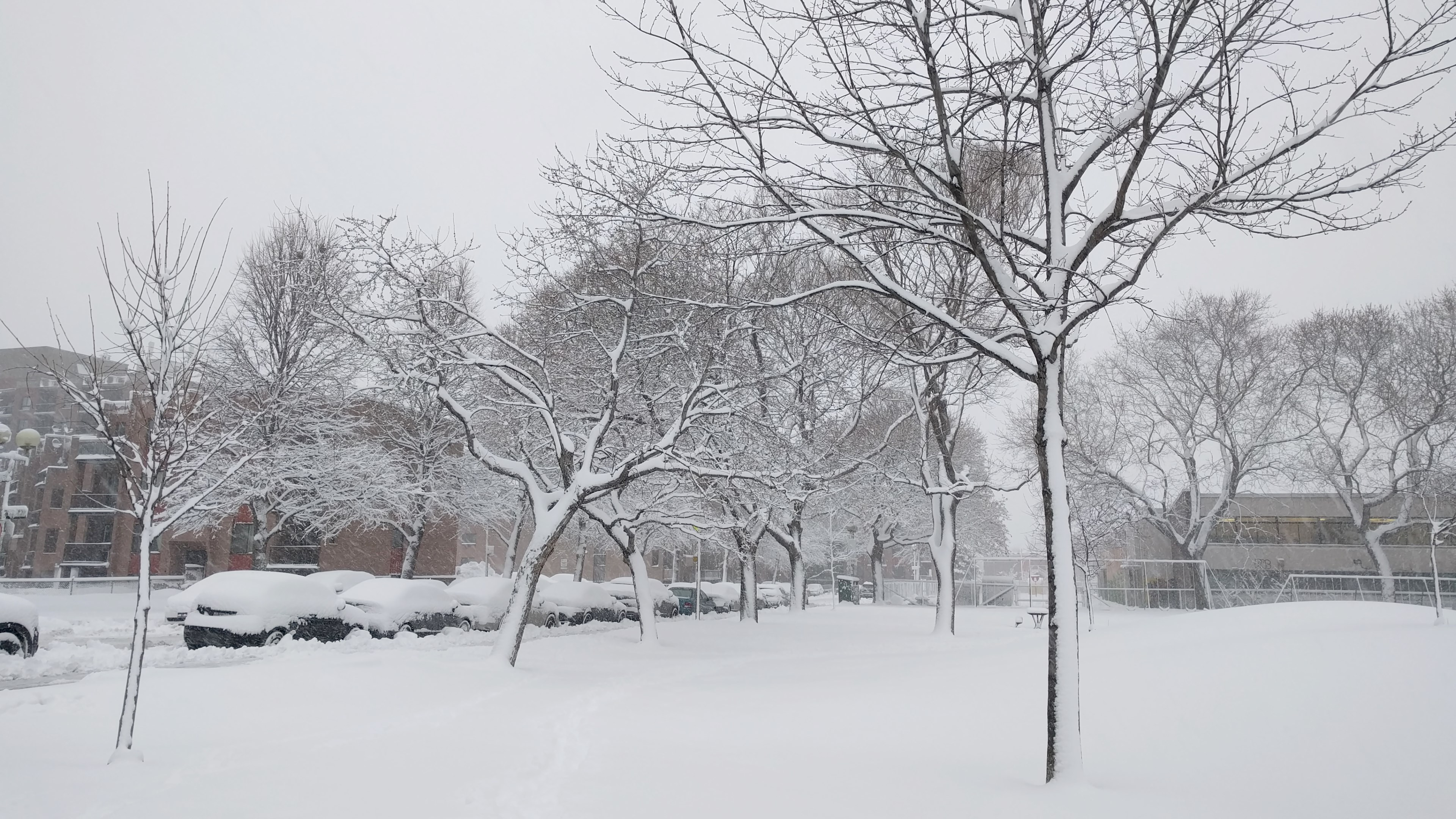
Winters in Montreal bring cold, snowy, windy, and at times, icy weather.

Winter brings cold, snowy, windy, and, at times, icy weather, with a daily average ranging from −10.5 to −9 °C (13.1 to 15.8 °F) in January. However, some winter days rise above freezing, allowing for rain on an average of 4 days in January and February each. Usually, snow covering some or all bare ground lasts on average from the first or second week of December until March. While the air temperature has not fallen below −30 °C (−22 °F) for more than 30 years, the wind chill often makes the temperature feel this low to exposed skin.

Spring and fall are pleasantly mild but prone to drastic temperature changes; spring even more so than fall. Late season heat waves as well as "Indian summers" are possible. Early and late season snow storms can occur in November and March, and more rarely in April. Montreal is generally snow free from late April to late October. However, snow can fall in early to mid-October as well as early May on rare occasions.

The lowest temperature in Environment Canada's books was −37.8 °C (−36 °F) on January 15, 1957, and the highest temperature was 37.6 °C (99.7 °F) on August 1, 1975, both at Dorval International Airport.

Before modern weather record keeping (which dates back to 1871 for McGill), a minimum temperature almost 5 degrees lower was recorded at 7 a.m. on January 10, 1859, where it registered at −42 °C (−44 °F).

Annual precipitation is around 1,000 mm (39 in), including an average of about 210 cm (83 in) of snowfall, which occurs from November through March. Thunderstorms are common from late spring through summer to early fall; additionally, tropical storms or their remnants can cause heavy rains and gales. Montreal averages 2,050 hours of sunshine annually, with summer being the sunniest season, though slightly wetter than the others in terms of total precipitation—mostly from thunderstorms.

Climate data for Montreal (Montréal–Trudeau International Airport) WMO ID: 71627; coordinates 45°28′N 73°45′W; elevation: 36 m (118 ft); 1991−2020 normals, extremes 1941−present
Month	Jan	Feb	Mar	Apr	May	Jun	Jul	Aug	Sep	Oct	Nov	Dec	Year
Record high humidex	13.5	14.7	28.0	33.8	40.9	45.0	45.8	46.8	42.8	34.1	26	18.1	46.8
Record high °C (°F)	13.9 (57.0)	15.1 (59.2)	25.8 (78.4)	30.0 (86.0)	36.6 (97.9)	35.0 (95.0)	36.1 (97.0)	37.6 (99.7)	33.5 (92.3)	28.3 (82.9)	24.3 (75.7)	18.0 (64.4)	37.6 (99.7)
Mean maximum °C (°F)	7.1 (44.8)	6.7 (44.1)	13.5 (56.3)	23.3 (73.9)	29.3 (84.7)	31.4 (88.5)	32.4 (90.3)	31.5 (88.7)	29.4 (84.9)	23.2 (73.8)	17.0 (62.6)	10.0 (50.0)	33.2 (91.8)
Mean daily maximum °C (°F)	−5.0 (23.0)	−3.4 (25.9)	2.4 (36.3)	11.3 (52.3)	19.4 (66.9)	24.2 (75.6)	26.7 (80.1)	25.7 (78.3)	21.1 (70.0)	13.2 (55.8)	6.1 (43.0)	−1.2 (29.8)	11.7 (53.1)
Daily mean °C (°F)	−9.2 (15.4)	−8.0 (17.6)	−2.0 (28.4)	6.2 (43.2)	13.9 (57.0)	19.0 (66.2)	21.7 (71.1)	20.6 (69.1)	16.0 (60.8)	8.9 (48.0)	2.3 (36.1)	−5.0 (23.0)	7.0 (44.6)
Mean daily minimum °C (°F)	−13.5 (7.7)	−12.4 (9.7)	−6.5 (20.3)	1.1 (34.0)	8.3 (46.9)	13.8 (56.8)	16.7 (62.1)	15.6 (60.1)	10.9 (51.6)	4.5 (40.1)	−1.7 (28.9)	−8.7 (16.3)	2.3 (36.1)
Mean minimum °C (°F)	−25.3 (−13.5)	−22.6 (−8.7)	−18.2 (−0.8)	−6.3 (20.7)	1.2 (34.2)	6.8 (44.2)	11.2 (52.2)	9.1 (48.4)	3.4 (38.1)	−3.0 (26.6)	−10.4 (13.3)	−20.6 (−5.1)	−26.3 (−15.3)
Record low °C (°F)	−37.8 (−36.0)	−33.9 (−29.0)	−29.4 (−20.9)	−15.0 (5.0)	−4.4 (24.1)	0.0 (32.0)	6.1 (43.0)	3.3 (37.9)	−2.2 (28.0)	−7.2 (19.0)	−19.4 (−2.9)	−32.4 (−26.3)	−37.8 (−36.0)
Record low wind chill	−49.1	−46.0	−42.9	−26.3	−9.9	0.0	0.0	0.0	−4.8	−11.6	−30.7	−46.0	−49.1
Average precipitation mm (inches)	85.8 (3.38)	65.5 (2.58)	77.2 (3.04)	90.0 (3.54)	85.6 (3.37)	83.6 (3.29)	91.1 (3.59)	93.6 (3.69)	89.2 (3.51)	103.1 (4.06)	84.2 (3.31)	91.9 (3.62)	1,040.8 (40.98)
Average rainfall mm (inches)	32.8 (1.29)	16.9 (0.67)	37.3 (1.47)	74.9 (2.95)	85.6 (3.37)	83.6 (3.29)	91.2 (3.59)	93.6 (3.69)	89.2 (3.51)	101.6 (4.00)	67.4 (2.65)	44.2 (1.74)	818.3 (32.22)
Average snowfall cm (inches)	52.0 (20.5)	47.1 (18.5)	37.1 (14.6)	14.8 (5.8)	0.0 (0.0)	0.0 (0.0)	0.0 (0.0)	0.0 (0.0)	0.0 (0.0)	1.1 (0.4)	16.3 (6.4)	48.2 (19.0)	216.6 (85.3)
Average precipitation days (≥ 0.2 mm)	17.1	13.7	13.7	12.4	13.8	12.9	12.8	11.2	11.3	13.5	14.3	16.8	163.3
Average rainy days (≥ 0.2 mm)	4.5	3.8	7.0	11.4	13.7	12.9	12.8	11.2	11.3	13.2	11.1	6.7	119.6
Average snowy days (≥ 0.2 cm)	15.4	12.4	9.0	3.0	0.04	0.0	0.0	0.0	0.0	0.63	4.8	12.8	58.2
Average relative humidity (%) (at 1500 LST)	68.1	63.0	57.8	50.7	49.8	53.6	55.5	56.1	58.2	61.4	66.4	71.9	59.4
Average dew point °C (°F)	−13.0 (8.6)	−12.2 (10.0)	−7.6 (18.3)	−1.5 (29.3)	6.0 (42.8)	12.2 (54.0)	15.4 (59.7)	14.9 (58.8)	11.1 (52.0)	4.4 (39.9)	−1.8 (28.8)	−8.0 (17.6)	1.7 (35.1)
Mean monthly sunshine hours	101.2	127.8	164.3	178.3	228.9	240.3	271.5	246.3	182.2	143.5	83.6	83.6	2,051.3
Percentage possible sunshine	35.7	43.7	44.6	44.0	49.6	51.3	57.3	56.3	48.3	42.2	29.2	30.7	44.4
Average ultraviolet index	1	2	3	5	6	7	7	7	5	3	1	1	4
Source 1: Environment and Climate Change Canada (sun 1981–2010) (November maximum) (November humidex) and Weather Atlas (UV index)
Source 2: weatherstats.ca (for dewpoint and monthly/yearly average absolute maximum/minimum temperature)

== Architecture ==
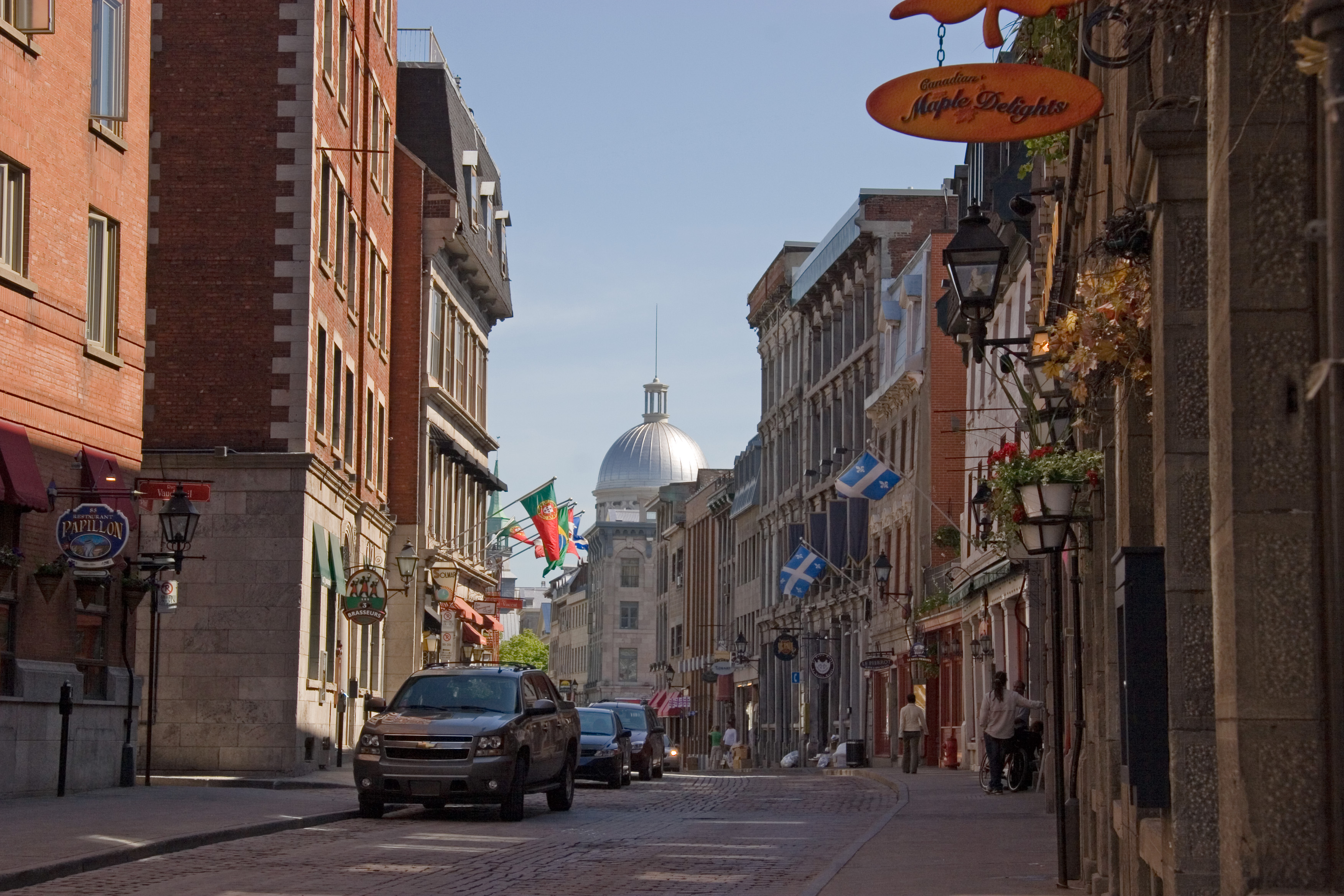
Many colonial era buildings can be found in Old Montreal with several dating as far back as the late 17th century.

For over a century and a half, Montreal was the industrial and financial centre of Canada. This legacy has left a variety of buildings including factories, elevators, warehouses, mills, and refineries, that today provide an invaluable insight into the city's history, especially in the downtown area and the Old Port area. There are 50 National Historic Sites of Canada, more than any other city.

Some of the city's earliest still-standing buildings date back to the late 17th and early 18th centuries. Although most are clustered around the Old Montreal area, such as the Sulpician Seminary adjacent to Notre-Dame Basilica that dates back to 1687, and Château Ramezay, which was built in 1705, examples of early colonial architecture are dotted throughout the city. Situated in Lachine, the Le Ber-Le Moyne House is the oldest complete building in the city, built between 1669 and 1671. In Point St. Charles, visitors can see the Maison Saint-Gabriel, which can trace its history back to 1698. There are many historic buildings in Old Montreal in their original form: Notre-Dame Basilica, Bonsecours Market, and the 19th‑century headquarters of all major Canadian banks on St. James Street (French: Rue Saint Jacques). Montreal's earliest buildings are characterized by their uniquely French influence and grey stone construction.

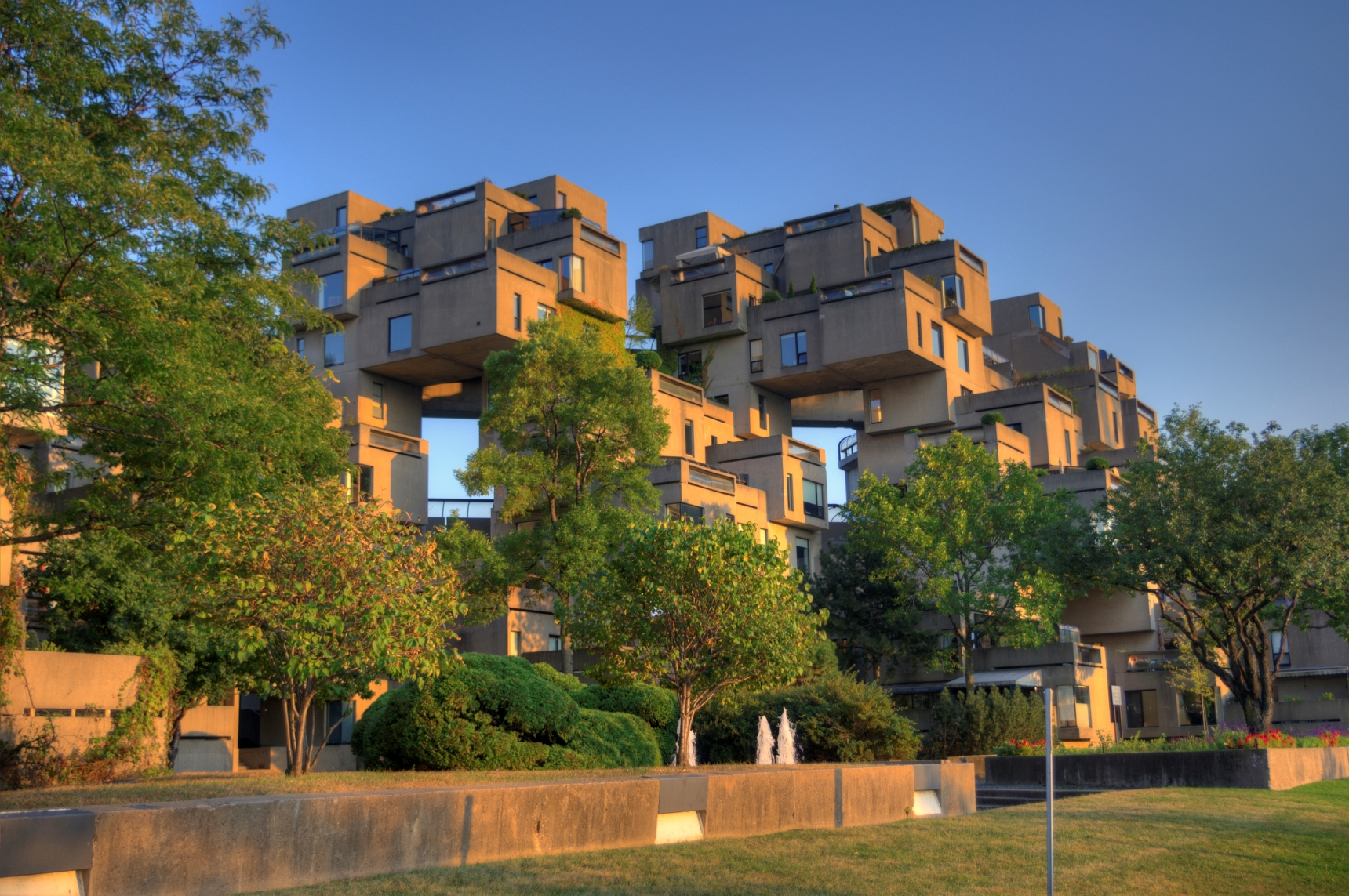
Habitat 67 is a model community and housing complex developed for Expo 67 World Fair.

A few notable examples of the city's 20th-century architecture include Saint Joseph's Oratory, completed in 1967, Ernest Cormier's Art Deco Université de Montréal main building, the landmark Place Ville Marie office tower, and the controversial Olympic Stadium and surrounding structures. Pavilions designed for the 1967 International and Universal Exposition, popularly known as Expo 67, featured a wide range of architectural designs. Though most pavilions were temporary structures, several have become landmarks, including Buckminster Fuller's geodesic dome U.S. Pavilion, now the Montreal Biosphere, and Moshe Safdie's striking Habitat 67 apartment complex.

The Montreal Metro has public artwork by some of the biggest names in Quebec culture.

In 2006, Montreal was named a UNESCO City of Design, one of only three design capitals in the world (the others being Berlin and Buenos Aires). This distinguished title recognizes Montreal's design community. Since 2005, the city has been home to the International Council of Graphic Design Associations (Icograda) and the International Design Alliance (IDA).

The Underground City (officially RÉSO), an important tourist attraction, is an underground network connecting shopping centres, pedestrian thoroughfares, universities, hotels, restaurants, bistros, subway stations and more, in and around downtown with 32 km (20 mi) of tunnels over 12 km^{2} (4.6 sq mi) in the most densely populated part of Montreal.

== Neighbourhoods ==
Map of boroughs and neighbourhoods on the island of Montreal

The city is composed of 19 large boroughs, subdivided into neighbourhoods. The boroughs are: Côte-des-Neiges–Notre-Dame-de-Grâce, Le Plateau-Mont-Royal (The Plateau Mount Royal), Outremont and Ville-Marie in the centre; Mercier–Hochelaga-Maisonneuve, Rosemont–La Petite-Patrie and Villeray–Saint-Michel–Parc-Extension in the east; Anjou, Montréal-Nord, Rivière-des-Prairies–Pointe-aux-Trembles and Saint-Léonard in the northeast; Ahuntsic-Cartierville, L'Île-Bizard–Sainte-Geneviève, Pierrefonds-Roxboro and Saint-Laurent in the northwest; and Lachine, LaSalle, Le Sud-Ouest (The Southwest) and Verdun in the south.

Many of these boroughs were independent cities that were forced to merge with Montreal in January 2002 following the 2002 municipal reorganization of Montreal.

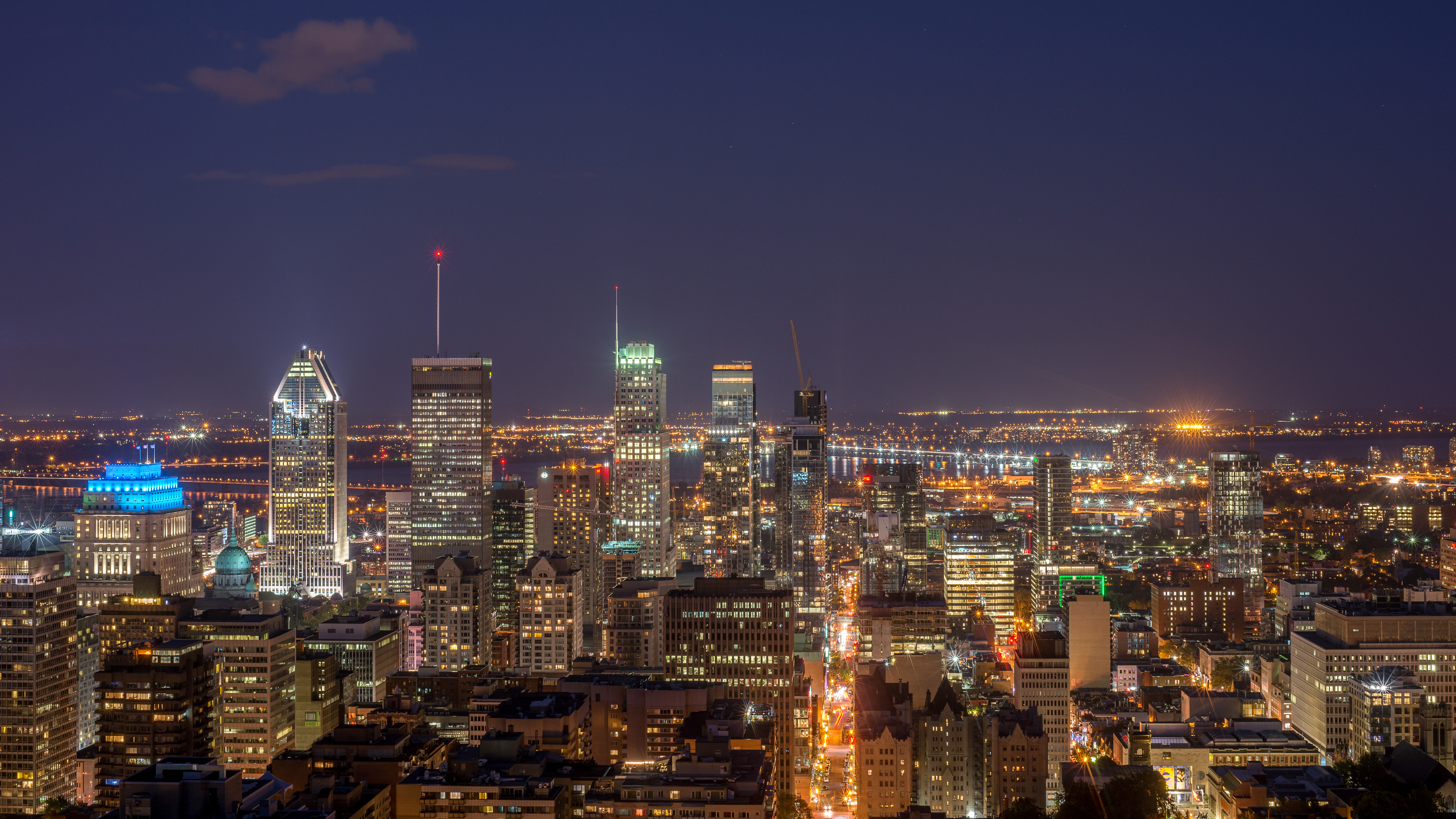
A view of Downtown Montreal from Mount Royal. Many neighbourhoods, including downtown, are in the borough of Ville-Marie.

The borough with the most neighbourhoods is Ville-Marie, which includes downtown, the historic district of Old Montreal, Chinatown, the Gay Village, the Latin Quarter, the gentrified Quartier international and Cité Multimédia as well as the Quartier des spectacles which is under development. Other neighbourhoods of interest in the borough include the affluent Golden Square Mile neighbourhood at the foot of Mount Royal and the Shaughnessy Village/Concordia U area home to thousands of students at Concordia University. The borough also comprises most of Mount Royal Park, Saint Helen's Island, and Notre-Dame Island.

The Plateau Mount Royal borough was a working class francophone area. The largest neighbourhood is the Plateau (not to be confused with the whole borough), which was undergoing considerable gentrification as of 2009, and a 2001 study deemed it as Canada's most creative neighbourhood because artists comprise 8% of its labour force. The neighbourhood of Mile End in the northwestern part of the borough has been a very multicultural area of the city, and features two of Montreal's well-known bagel establishments, St-Viateur Bagel and Fairmount Bagel. The McGill Ghetto is in the extreme southwestern portion of the borough, its name being derived from the fact that it is home to thousands of McGill University students and faculty members.

The Southwest borough was home to much of the city's industry during the late 19th and early-to-mid 20th century. The borough included Goose Village and was historically home to the traditionally working-class Irish neighbourhoods of Griffintown and Point Saint Charles as well as the low-income neighbourhoods of Saint Henri and Little Burgundy.

Other notable neighbourhoods include the multicultural areas of Notre-Dame-de-Grâce and Côte-des-Neiges in the Côte-des-Neiges–Notre-Dame-de-Grace borough, and Little Italy in the borough of Rosemont–La Petite-Patrie and Hochelaga-Maisonneuve, home of the Olympic Stadium in the borough of Mercier–Hochelaga-Maisonneuve.

=== Old Montreal ===
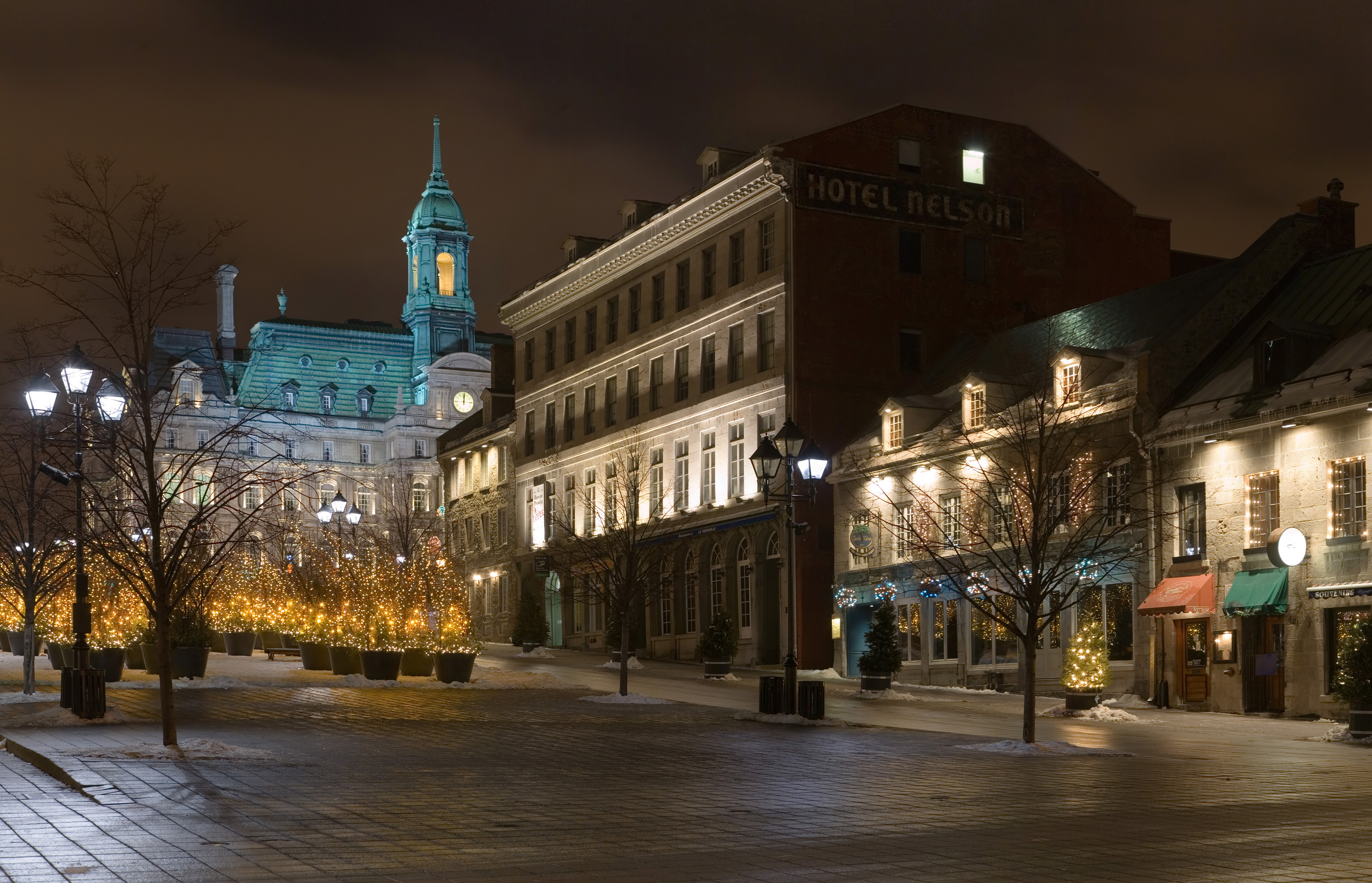
Place Jacques-Cartier is a major public square and attraction in Old Montreal.

Old Montreal is a historic area southeast of downtown containing many attractions such as the Old Port of Montreal, Place Jacques-Cartier, Montreal City Hall, the Bonsecours Market, Place d'Armes, Pointe-à-Callière Museum, the Notre-Dame de Montréal Basilica, and the Montreal Science Centre.

Architecture and cobbled streets in Old Montreal have been maintained or restored. Old Montreal is accessible from the downtown core via the underground city and is served by several STM bus routes and Metro stations, ferries to the South Shore and a network of bicycle paths.

The riverside area adjacent to Old Montreal is known as the Old Port. It was once the site of the Port of Montreal, but its shipping operations have been moved to a larger site downstream, leaving the former location as a recreational and historical area maintained by Parks Canada. The new Port of Montreal is Canada's largest container port and the largest inland port on Earth.

=== Mount Royal ===
The mountain is the site of Mount Royal Park, one of Montreal's largest greenspaces. The park, most of which is wooded, was designed by Frederick Law Olmsted, who also designed New York's Central Park, and was inaugurated in 1876.

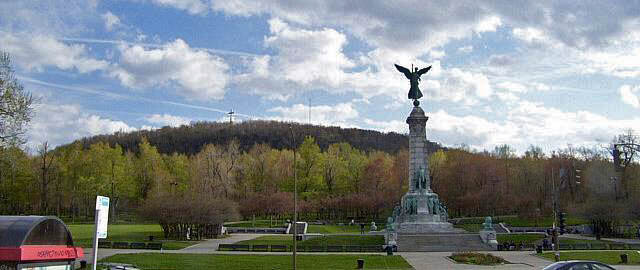
View of Mont-Royal's eastern slope from the George-Étienne Cartier Monument. The park is one of Montreal's largest open space reserves.

The park contains two belvederes, the more prominent of which is the Kondiaronk Belvedere, a semicircular plaza with a chalet overlooking Downtown Montreal. Other features of the park are Beaver Lake, a small man-made lake, a short ski slope, a sculpture garden, Smith House, an interpretive centre, and a well-known monument to Sir George-Étienne Cartier. The park hosts athletic, tourist and cultural activities.

The mountain is home to two major cemeteries, Notre-Dame-des-Neiges (founded in 1854) and Mount Royal (1852). Mount Royal Cemetery is a 165 acres (67 ha) terraced cemetery on the north slope of Mount Royal in the borough of Outremont. Notre Dame des Neiges Cemetery is much larger, predominantly French-Canadian and officially Catholic. More than 900,000 people are buried there.

Mount Royal Cemetery contains more than 162,000 graves and is the final resting place for a number of notable Canadians. It includes a veterans section with several soldiers who were awarded the British Empire's highest military honour, the Victoria Cross. In 1901, the Mount Royal Cemetery Company established the first crematorium in Canada.

The first cross on the mountain was placed there in 1643 by Paul Chomedey de Maisonneuve, the founder of the city, in fulfilment of a vow he made to the Virgin Mary when praying to her to stop a disastrous flood. Today, the mountain is crowned by a 31.4 m-high (103 ft) illuminated cross, installed in 1924 by the John the Baptist Society and now owned by the city. It was converted to fibre optic light in 1992. The new system can turn the lights red, blue, or purple, the last of which is used as a sign of mourning between the death of the Pope and the election of the next.

In 2024, Elie-Wiesel Park was inaugurated on de Courtrai Avenue near Décarie Boulevard and Westbury Avenue in the Snowdon district in Côte-des-Neiges–Notre-Dame-de-Grâce in honour of Elie Wiesel, the Holocaust survivor, writer, professor, and Nobel Peace Prize winner; it has a playground, relaxation area, walking trails, furniture, green spaces, and unique water features.

== Demographics ==
Population history of Montreal
Year	Pop.	±%
1666	625	—
1667	760	+21.6%
1681	1,418	+86.6%
1685	724	−48.9%
1688	1,360	+87.8%
1692	801	−41.1%
1695	1,468	+83.3%
1698	1,185	−19.3%
1706	2,025	+70.9%
1739	4,210	+107.9%
1754	4,000	−5.0%
1765	5,733	+43.3%
1790	18,000	+214.0%
1825	31,516	+75.1%
1831	27,297	−13.4%
1841	40,356	+47.8%
1851	57,715	+43.0%
1861	90,323	+56.5%
1871	130,022	+44.0%
1881	176,263	+35.6%
1891	254,278	+44.3%
1901	325,653	+28.1%
1911	490,504	+50.6%
1921	618,506	+26.1%
1931	818,577	+32.3%
1941	903,007	+10.3%
1951	1,021,520	+13.1%
1961	1,201,559	+17.6%
1971	1,214,352	+1.1%
1976	1,080,545	−11.0%
1981	1,018,609	−5.7%
1986	1,015,420	−0.3%
1991	1,017,666	+0.2%
1996	1,016,376	−0.1%
2001	1,039,534	+2.3%
2006	1,620,693	+55.9%
2011	1,649,519	+1.8%
2016	1,704,694	+3.3%
2021	1,762,949	+3.4%
Note: Many boroughs were independent cities that were forced to merge with Montreal in January 2002 following the 2002 municipal reorganization of Montreal. Source: 2016, 2021

In the 2021 Canadian census conducted by Statistics Canada, Montreal had a population of 1,762,949 living in 816,338 of its 878,542 total private dwellings, a change of 3.4% from its 2016 population of 1,704,694. With a land area of 364.74 km^{2} (140.83 sq mi), it had a population density of 4,833.4/km^{2} (12,518.6/sq mi) in 2021.

At the same census Statistics Canada the Census metropolitan area had a population of 4,291,732, an increase of 4.6% from its 2016 population of 4,104,074.

The 2021 census recorded 270,430 (15.3%) children between 0 and 14 years of age, while 295,475 (16.8%) were 65 and over.

According to Statistics Canada, by 2030, the Greater Montreal Area is expected to number 5,275,000 with 1,722,000 being visible minorities.

=== Ethnicity ===
People of European ethnicities formed the largest cluster of ethnic groups. The largest reported European ethnicities in the 2006 census were French (23%), Italians (10%), Irish (5%), English (4%), Scottish (3%), and Spanish (2%).

The panethnic breakdown of the city of Montreal as per the 2021 census was European (Note: Statistic includes all persons that did not make up part of a visible minority or an indigenous identity.) (1,038,940 residents or 60.3% of the population), African (198,610; 11.5%), Middle Eastern (Note: Statistic includes total responses of "West Asian" and "Arab" under visible minority section on census.) (159,435; 9.3%), South Asian (79,670; 4.6%), Latin American (78,150; 4.5%), Southeast Asian (Note: Statistic includes total responses of "Filipino" and "Southeast Asian" under visible minority section on census.) (65,260; 3.8%), East Asian (Note: Statistic includes total responses of "Chinese", "Korean", and "Japanese" under visible minority section on census.) (64,825; 3.8%), Indigenous (15,315; 0.9%), and Other/Multiracial (Note: Statistic includes total responses of "Visible minority, n.i.e." and "Multiple visible minorities" under visible minority section on census.) (23,010; 1.3%).

Visible minorities comprised 38.8% of the city of Montreal population in the 2021 census. The five most numerous visible minorities are Black Canadians (11.5%), Arab Canadians (8.2%), South Asian Canadians (4.6%), Latin Americans (4.5%), and Chinese Canadians (3.3%). Furthermore, some 27.2% of the population Greater Montreal are members of a visible minority group as of 2021, up from 5.2% in 1981. Visible minorities are defined by the Canadian Employment Equity Act as "persons, other than Aboriginals, who are non-white in colour".

=== Language ===
As of the 2021 Census, 47.0% of Montreal residents spoke French alone as a first language, while 13.0% spoke English alone. Some 2% spoke both English and French as first languages, 2.6% spoke both French and a non-official language and 1.5% spoke both English and a non-official language. 0.8% of residents spoke English, French and a non-official language as first languages. 32.8% of residents spoke one non-official language as a first language, and 0.3% spoke multiple non-official languages as first languages. The most common were Arabic (5.7%), Spanish (4.6%), Italian (3.3%), Chinese languages (2.7%), Haitian Creole (1.6%), Vietnamese (1.1%), and Portuguese (1.0%).

=== Immigration ===
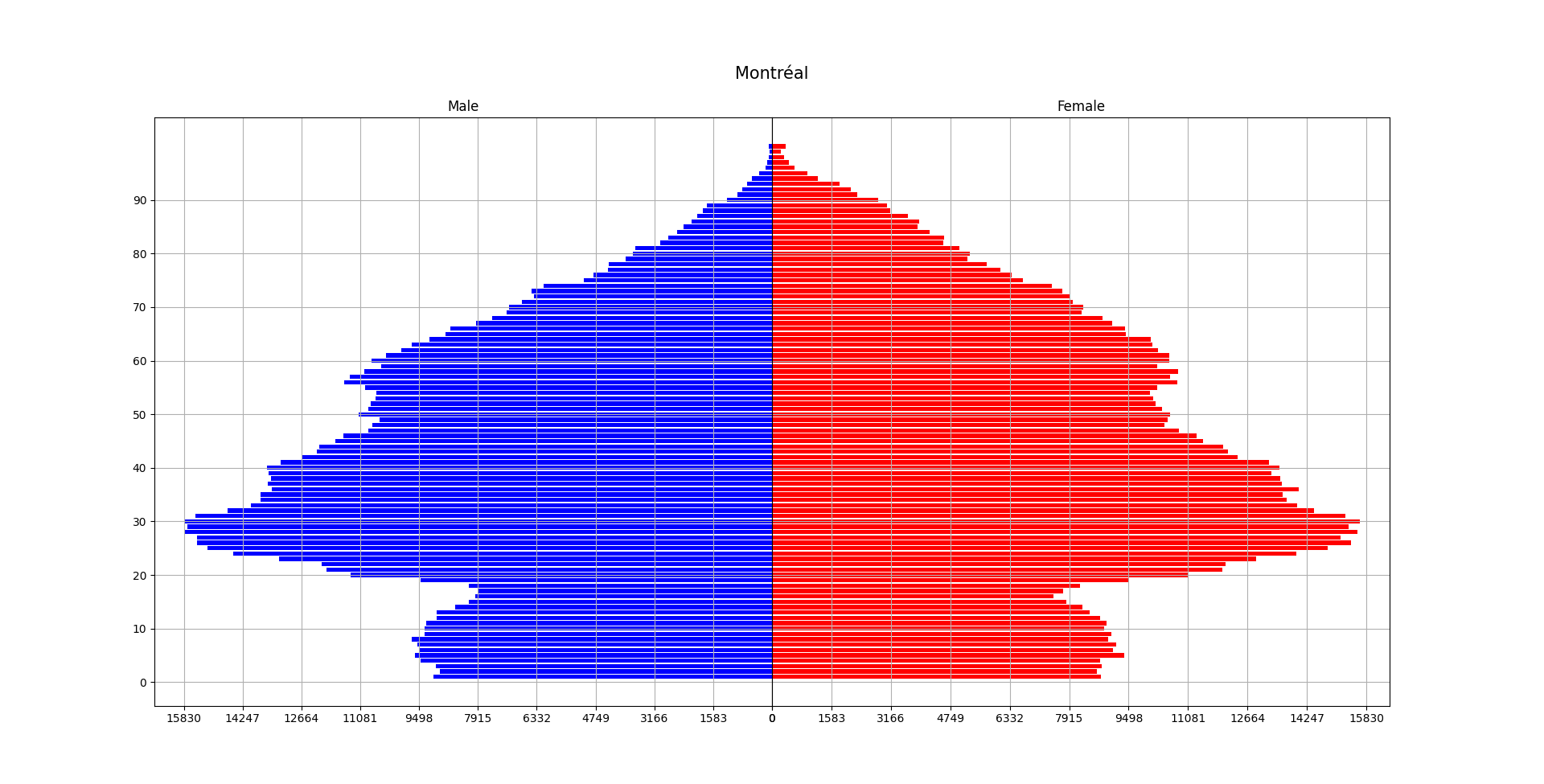
Population age pyramid of Montréal (2021 Census)

The 2021 census reported that immigrants (individuals born outside Canada) comprise 576,125 persons or 33.4% of the total population of Montreal. Of the total immigrant population, the top countries of origin were Haiti (47,550 residents or 8.3% of the population), Algeria (43,840; 7.6%), France (39,275; 6.8%), Morocco (33,005; 5.7%), Italy (30,215; 5.2%), China (26,335; 4.6%), the Philippines (20,475; 3.6%), Lebanon (17,455; 3.0%), Vietnam (16,395; 2.8%), and India (13,575; 2.4%).

=== Religion ===
Religion in Montreal (2021)
Religion	Percent (%)
Christian	49.5%
No religion	31.0%
Muslim	12.7%
Jewish	2.1%
Hindu	1.8%
Buddhist	1.5%
Sikh	0.9%
Other	0.5%

The Greater Montreal Area is predominantly Catholic; however, weekly church attendance in Quebec was among the lowest in Canada in 1998. Historically, Montreal has been a centre of Roman Catholicism in North America with its numerous seminaries and churches, including the Notre-Dame Basilica, the Cathédrale Marie-Reine-du-Monde, and Saint Joseph's Oratory.

Some 49.5% of the total population was Christian in 2021, largely Roman Catholic (35.0%), primarily because of descendants of original French settlers, and others of Italian and Irish origins. Protestants, which include members of Anglican, United and Lutheran churches and who are largely of British and German descent, formed 11.3% of the population; a further 3.2% consisted mostly of Orthodox Christians, mainly of Greek origin but also including members of Russian, Ukrainian, and Armenian Orthodox churches.

Islam is the largest non-Christian religious group, with 218,395 members in 2021, the second-largest concentration of Muslims in Canada at 12.7%. The Jewish community in Montreal had a population of 90,780. In cities such as Côte Saint-Luc and Hampstead, Jewish people constitute the majority, or a substantial part of the population. In 1971 the Jewish community in Greater Montreal numbered 109,480. Political and economic uncertainties about potential Quebec independence led many to leave Montreal and the province of Quebec for Toronto.

== Economy ==
Montreal has the second-largest economy of Canadian cities based on GDP and the largest in Quebec. In 2019, Metropolitan Montreal was responsible for CA$234.0 billion of Quebec's CA$425.3 billion GDP. The city is today an important centre of commerce, finance, industry, technology, culture, world affairs and is the headquarters of the Montreal Exchange. In recent decades, the city’s economy was widely seen as weaker than that of Toronto and other major Canadian cities, but it has recently experienced a revival.

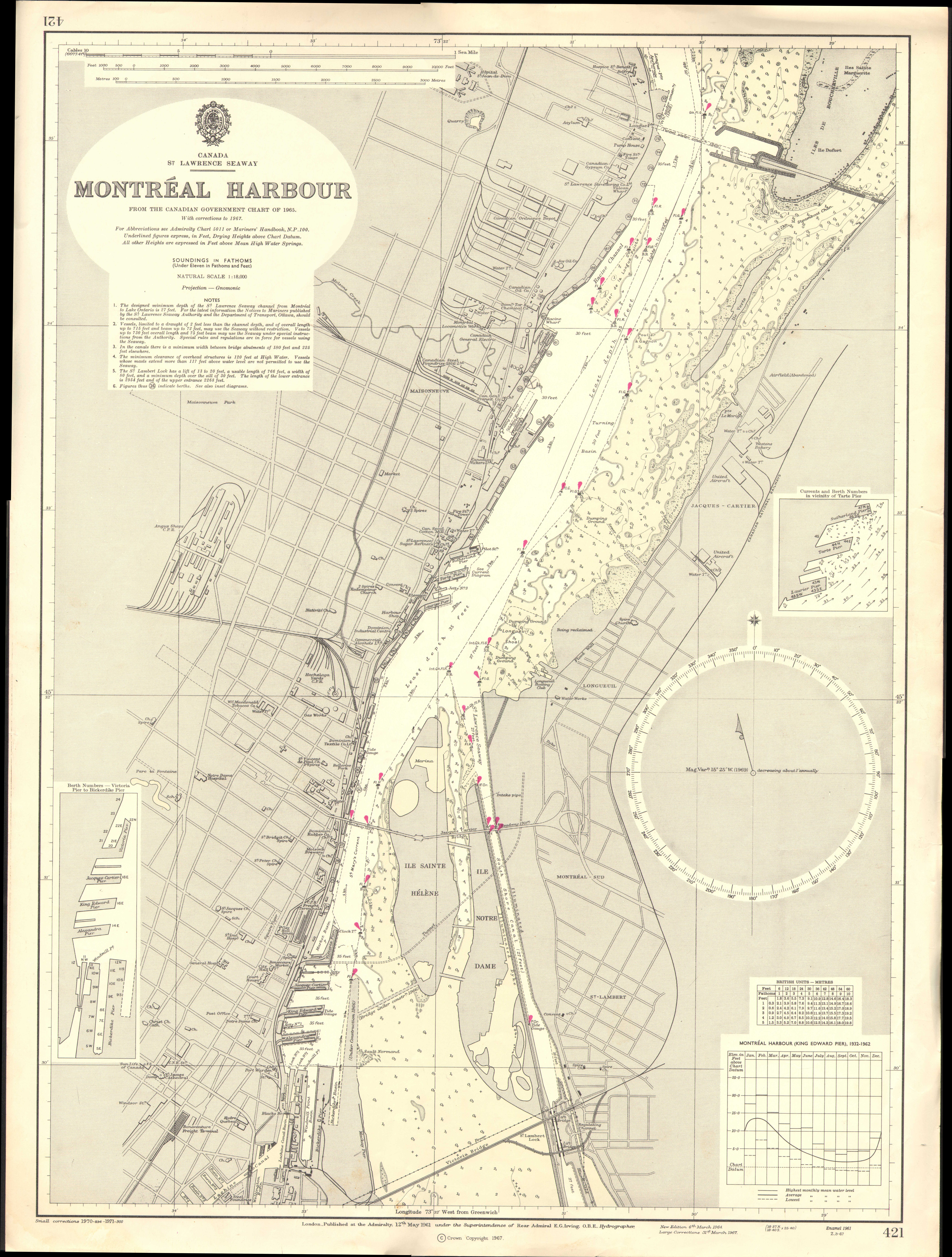
1967 nautical chart of Montreal Harbour

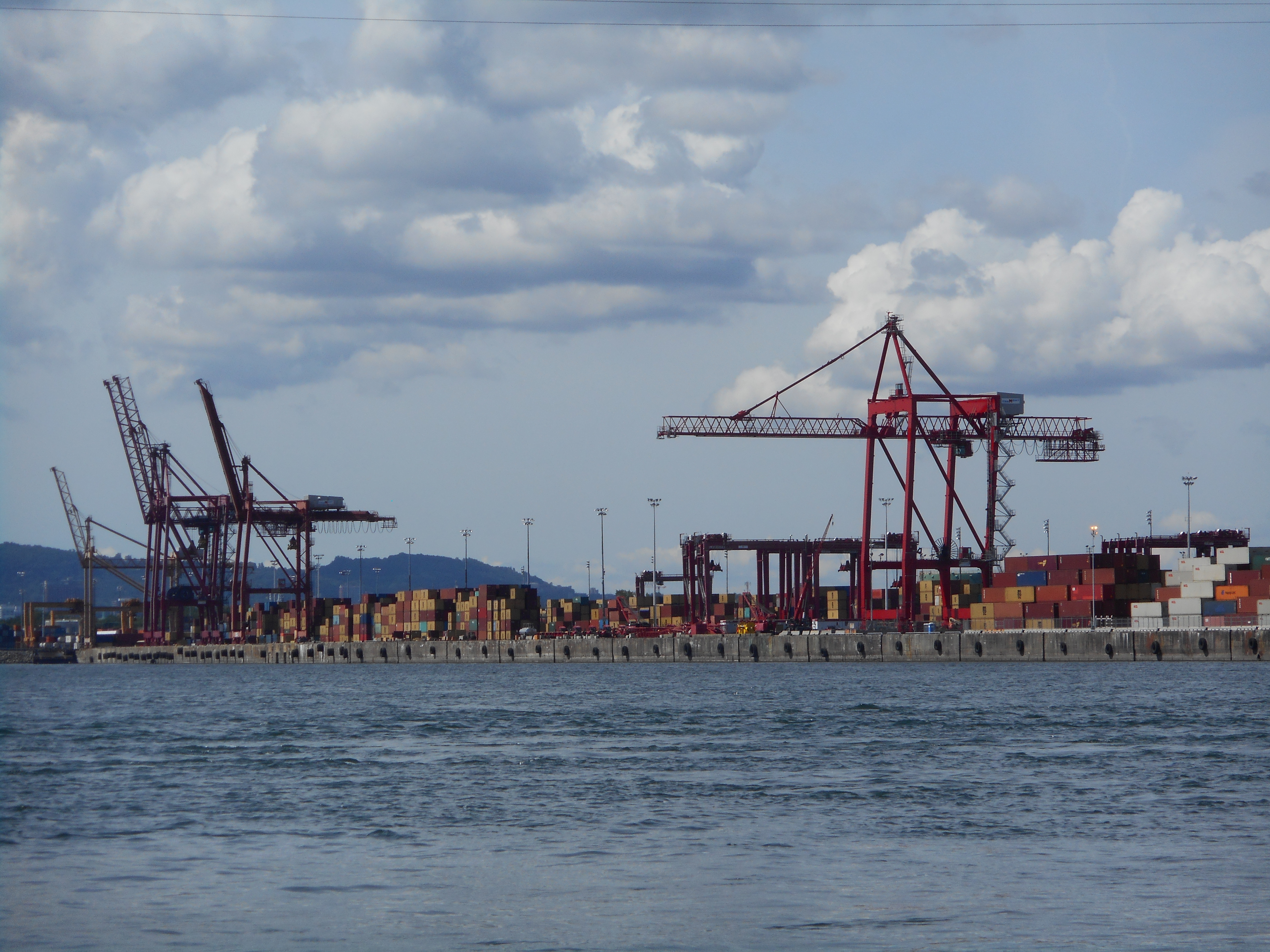
The Port of Montreal

Industries include aerospace, electronic goods, pharmaceuticals, printed goods, software engineering, telecommunications, textile and apparel manufacturing, tobacco, petrochemicals, and transportation. The service sector is also strong and includes civil, mechanical and process engineering, finance, higher education, and research and development. In 2002, Montreal was the fourth-largest centre in North America in terms of aerospace jobs. The Port of Montreal is one of the largest inland ports in the world, handling 26 million tonnes of cargo annually as of 2008. As one of the most important ports in Canada, it remains a transshipment point for grain, sugar, petroleum products, machinery, and consumer goods. For this reason, Montreal is the railway hub of Canada and has always been an extremely important rail city; it is home to the headquarters of the Canadian National Railway, and was home to the headquarters of the Canadian Pacific Railway until 1995.

The headquarters of the Canadian Space Agency is in Longueuil, southeast of Montreal. Montreal also hosts the headquarters of the International Civil Aviation Organization (ICAO, a United Nations body); the World Anti-Doping Agency (an Olympic body); the Airports Council International (the association of the world's airports – ACI World); the International Air Transport Association (IATA), IATA Operational Safety Audit and the International Gay and Lesbian Chamber of Commerce (IGLCC), as well as some other international organizations in various fields.

Montreal is a centre of film and television production. The headquarters of Alliance Films and five studios of the Academy Award-winning National Film Board of Canada are in the city, as well as the head offices of Telefilm Canada, the national feature-length film and television funding agency and Télévision de Radio-Canada. Given its eclectic architecture and broad availability of film services and crew members, Montreal is a popular filming location for feature-length films, and sometimes stands in for European locations. The city is also home to many recognized cultural, film, and music festivals (Just For Laughs, Just For Laughs Gags, Montreal International Jazz Festival, and others), which contribute significantly to its economy. It is also home to one of the world's largest cultural enterprises, the Cirque du Soleil.

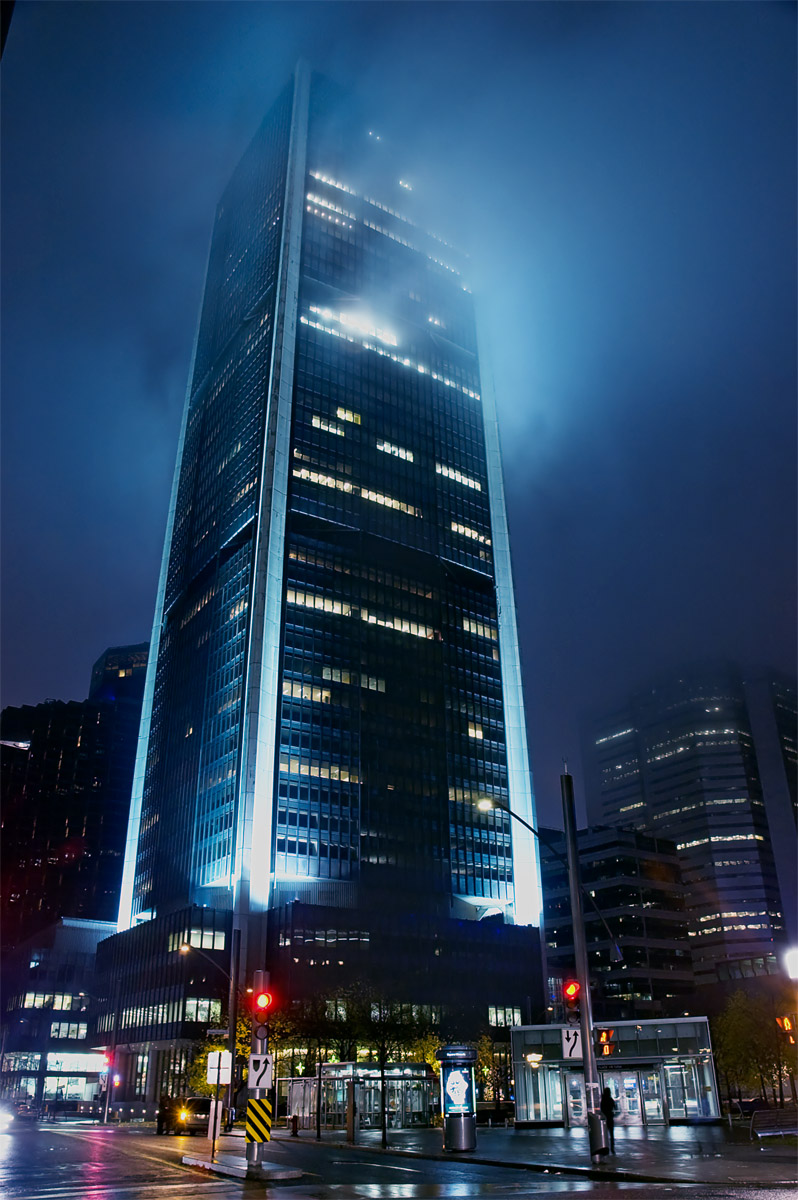
Tour de la Bourse has been home to the Montreal Exchange from 1965 to 2018, subsequently also including offices of various companies, entities and professional firms.

Montreal is also a global hub for artificial intelligence research with many companies involved in this sector, such as Facebook AI Research (FAIR), Microsoft Research, Google Brain, DeepMind, Samsung Research and Thales Group (cortAIx). The city is also home to Mila (research institute), an artificial intelligence research institute with over 500 researchers specializing in the field of deep learning, the largest of its kind in the world.

The video game industry has been booming in Montreal since November 2, 1995, coinciding with the opening of Ubisoft Montreal. Recently, the city has attracted world leading game developers and publishers studios such as EA, Eidos Interactive, BioWare, Artificial Mind and Movement, Strategy First, THQ, and Gameloft mainly because of the quality of local specialized labour, and tax credits offered to the corporations. In 2010, Warner Bros. Interactive Entertainment, a division of Warner Bros., announced that it would open a video game studio. Relatively new to the video game industry, it will be Warner Bros. first studio opened, not purchased, and will develop games for such Warner Bros. franchises as Batman and other games from their DC Comics portfolio. The studio will create 300 jobs.

Montreal plays an important role in the finance industry. The sector employs approximately 100,000 people in the Greater Montreal Area. The city is home to the Montreal Exchange, the oldest stock exchange in Canada and the only financial derivatives exchange in the country. The corporate headquarters of the Bank of Montreal and Royal Bank of Canada, two of the biggest banks in Canada, were in Montreal. While both banks moved their headquarters to Toronto, Ontario, their legal corporate offices remain in Montreal. The city is home to head offices of two smaller banks, National Bank of Canada and Laurentian Bank of Canada. The Caisse de dépôt et placement du Québec, an institutional investor managing assets totalling $408 billion CAD, has its main business office in Montreal. Many foreign subsidiaries operating in the financial sector also have offices in Montreal, including HSBC, Aon, Société Générale, BNP Paribas and AXA.

Several companies are headquartered in Greater Montreal Area including Rio Tinto Alcan, Bombardier Inc., Canadian National Railway, CGI Group, Air Canada, Air Transat, CAE, Saputo, Cirque du Soleil, Stingray Group, Quebecor, Ultramar, Kruger Inc., Jean Coutu Group, Uniprix, Proxim, Domtar, Le Château, Power Corporation, Cellcom Communications, Bell Canada. Standard Life, Hydro-Québec, AbitibiBowater, Pratt and Whitney Canada, Molson, Tembec, Canada Steamship Lines, Fednav, Alimentation Couche-Tard, SNC-Lavalin, MEGA Brands, Aeroplan, Agropur, Metro Inc., Laurentian Bank of Canada, National Bank of Canada, Transat A.T., Via Rail, GardaWorld, Novacam Technologies, SOLABS, Dollarama, Rona, Lallemand and the Caisse de dépôt et placement du Québec.

The Montreal Oil Refining Centre is the largest refining centre in Canada, with companies like Petro-Canada, Ultramar, Gulf Oil, Petromont, Ashland Canada, Parachem Petrochemical, Coastal Petrochemical, Interquisa (Cepsa) Petrochemical, Nova Chemicals, and more. Shell decided to close the refining centre in 2010, throwing hundreds out of work and causing an increased dependence on foreign refineries for eastern Canada.

== Culture ==
Montreal was referred to as "Canada's Cultural Capital" by Monocle magazine. The city is Canada's centre for French-language television productions, radio, theatre, film, multimedia, and print publishing. Montreal's many cultural communities have given it a distinct local culture. Montreal was designated as the World Book Capital for the year 2005 by UNESCO.

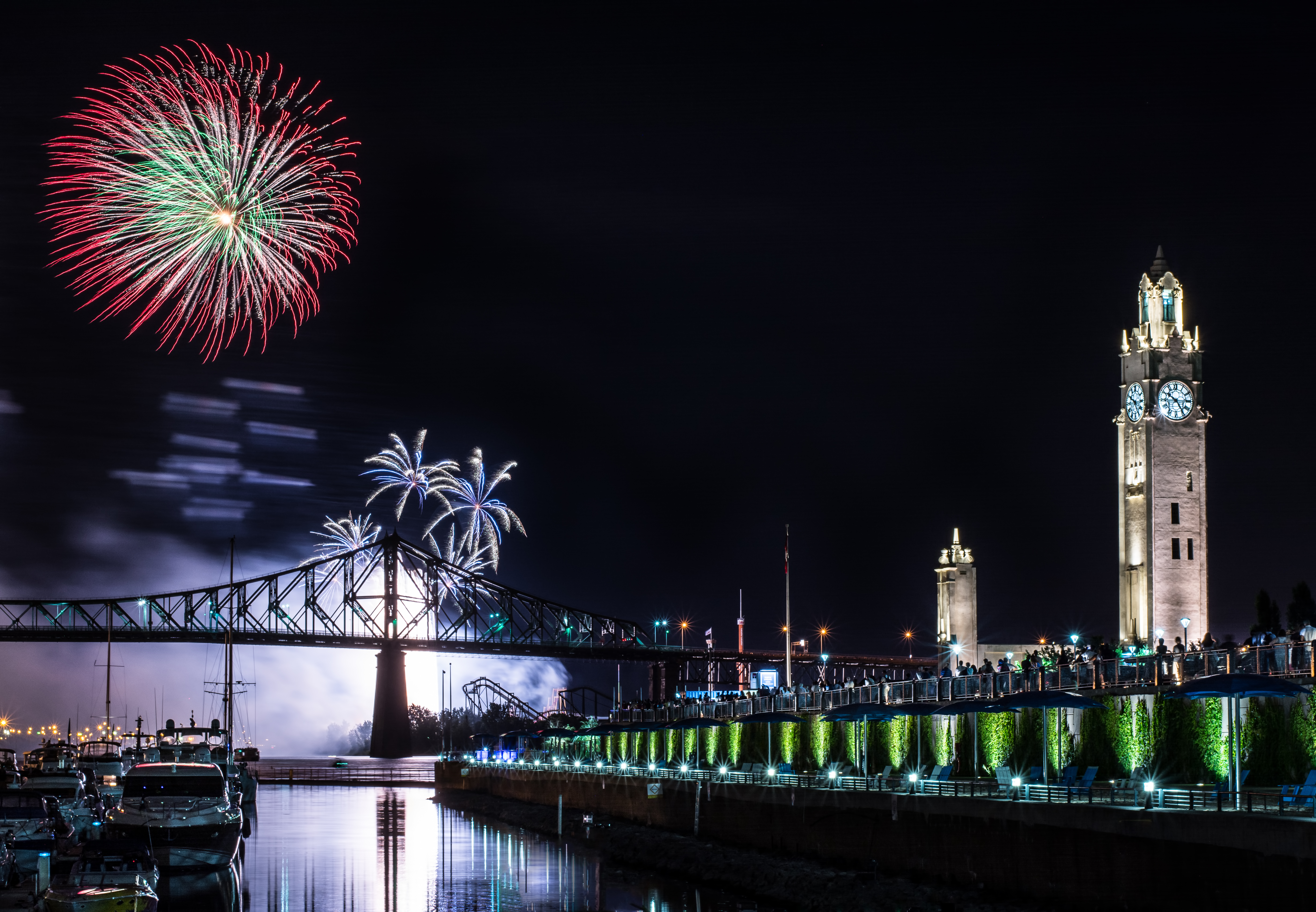
Montreal Fireworks Festival is the world's largest annual fireworks festival. The city hosts a number of festivals annually.

Being at the confluence of the French and English traditions, Montreal has developed a unique and distinguished cultural face. The city has produced much talent in the fields of visual arts, theatre, dance, and music, with a tradition of producing both jazz and rock music. Another distinctive characteristic of cultural life is the vibrancy of its downtown, particularly during summer, prompted by cultural and social events, including its more than 100 annual festivals, the largest being the Montreal International Jazz Festival which is the largest jazz festival in the world. Other popular events have included Just for Laughs (the largest comedy festival in the world), the Montreal World Film Festival, the Festival du nouveau cinéma, the Fantasia Film Festival, Les FrancoFolies de Montréal, Nuits d'Afrique, Pop Montreal, Divers/Cité, Fierté Montréal and the Montreal Fireworks Festival, Igloofest, Piknic Électronik, Montréal en Lumiere, Osheaga, Heavy Montréal, Mode + Design, Montréal complètement cirque, MUTEK, Black and Blue, and many smaller festivals. Montreal is also widely recognized for its diverse and vibrant night life, which is considered a vital part of the local cultural ecosystem.

A cultural hub of classical art and a venue for many summer festivals, the Place des Arts is a complex of different concert halls and theatre halls surrounding a large square in the eastern portion of downtown. Place des Arts serves as the headquarters for the Montreal Symphony Orchestra. The Orchestre Métropolitain and the chamber orchestra, I Musici de Montréal, are two other well-regarded Montreal orchestras. Also performing at Place des Arts are the Opéra de Montréal and the city's chief ballet company Les Grands Ballets Canadiens. Internationally recognized avant-garde dance troupes such as Compagnie Marie Chouinard, La La La Human Steps, O Vertigo, and the Fondation Jean-Pierre Perreault have toured the world and worked with international popular artists on videos and concerts. The unique choreography of these troupes has paved the way for the success of the world-renowned Cirque du Soleil.

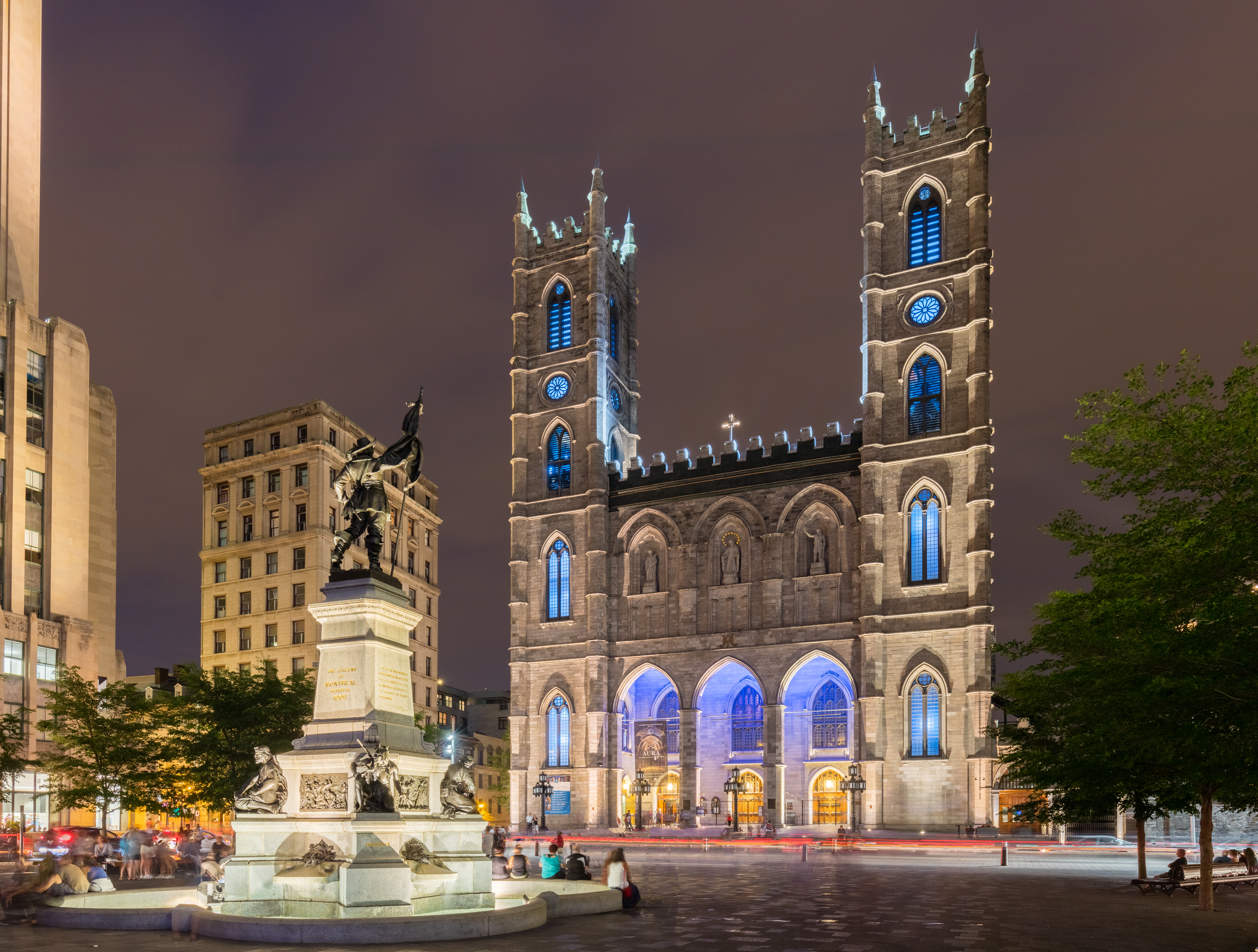
View of the Notre-Dame Basilica from Place d'Armes. The number of churches in Montreal led it to be called "the city of a hundred steeples".

Nicknamed la ville aux cent clochers (the city of a hundred steeples), Montreal is renowned for its churches. There are an estimated 650 churches on the island, with 450 of them dating back to the 1800s or earlier. Mark Twain noted, "This is the first time I was ever in a city where you couldn't throw a brick without breaking a church window." The city has four Roman Catholic basilicas: Mary, Queen of the World Cathedral, Notre-Dame Basilica, St Patrick's Basilica, and Saint Joseph's Oratory. The Oratory is the largest church in Canada, with the second largest copper dome in the world, after Saint Peter's Basilica in Rome.

Beginning in the 1940s, Quebec literature began to shift from pastoral tales romanticizing the French-Canadian countryside to writing set in the multicultural city of Montreal. Notable pioneering works describing the character of the city include Gabrielle Roy's 1945 novel Bonheur d'occasion, translated as The Tin Flute, and Gwethalyn Graham's 1944 novel Earth and High Heaven. Subsequent writers of fiction who have set their work in Montreal have included Mordecai Richler, Claude Jasmin, Michel Tremblay, Francine Noel, and Heather O'Neill, among many others.

== Sports ==
The most popular sport is ice hockey. The professional hockey team, the Montreal Canadiens, is one of the Original Six teams of the National Hockey League (NHL), and has won an NHL-record 24 Stanley Cup championships. The Canadiens' most recent Stanley Cup victory came in 1993. They have major rivalries with the Toronto Maple Leafs and Boston Bruins, both of which are also Original Six teams, and with the Ottawa Senators, the closest team geographically. The Canadiens have played at the Bell Centre since 1996. Prior to that, they played at the Montreal Forum.

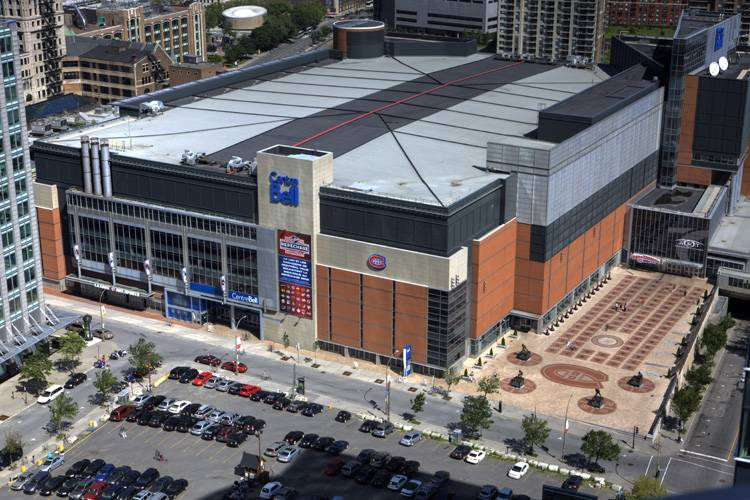
Opened in 1996, the Bell Centre is a sports and entertainment complex and the home arena for the Montreal Canadiens.

The Montreal Alouettes of the Canadian Football League (CFL) play at Percival Molson Memorial Stadium on the campus of McGill University for their regular-season games. Late season and playoff games are sometimes played at the much larger, enclosed Olympic Stadium, which also hosted the 2008 Grey Cup. The Alouettes have won the Grey Cup eight times, most recently in 2023. The Alouettes have had two periods on hiatus. During the second one, the Montreal Machine played in the World League of American Football in 1991 and 1992. The McGill Redbirds, Concordia Stingers, and Université de Montréal Carabins play in the U Sports football league.

Montreal has a storied baseball history. The city was the home of the minor-league Montreal Royals of the International League until 1960. In 1946, Jackie Robinson broke the Baseball colour line with the Royals in an emotionally difficult year; Robinson was forever grateful for the local fans' fervent support. Major League Baseball came to town in the form of the Montreal Expos in 1969. They played their games at Jarry Park Stadium until moving into Olympic Stadium in 1977. After 36 years in Montreal, the team relocated to Washington, D.C., in 2005 and re-branded themselves as the Washington Nationals.

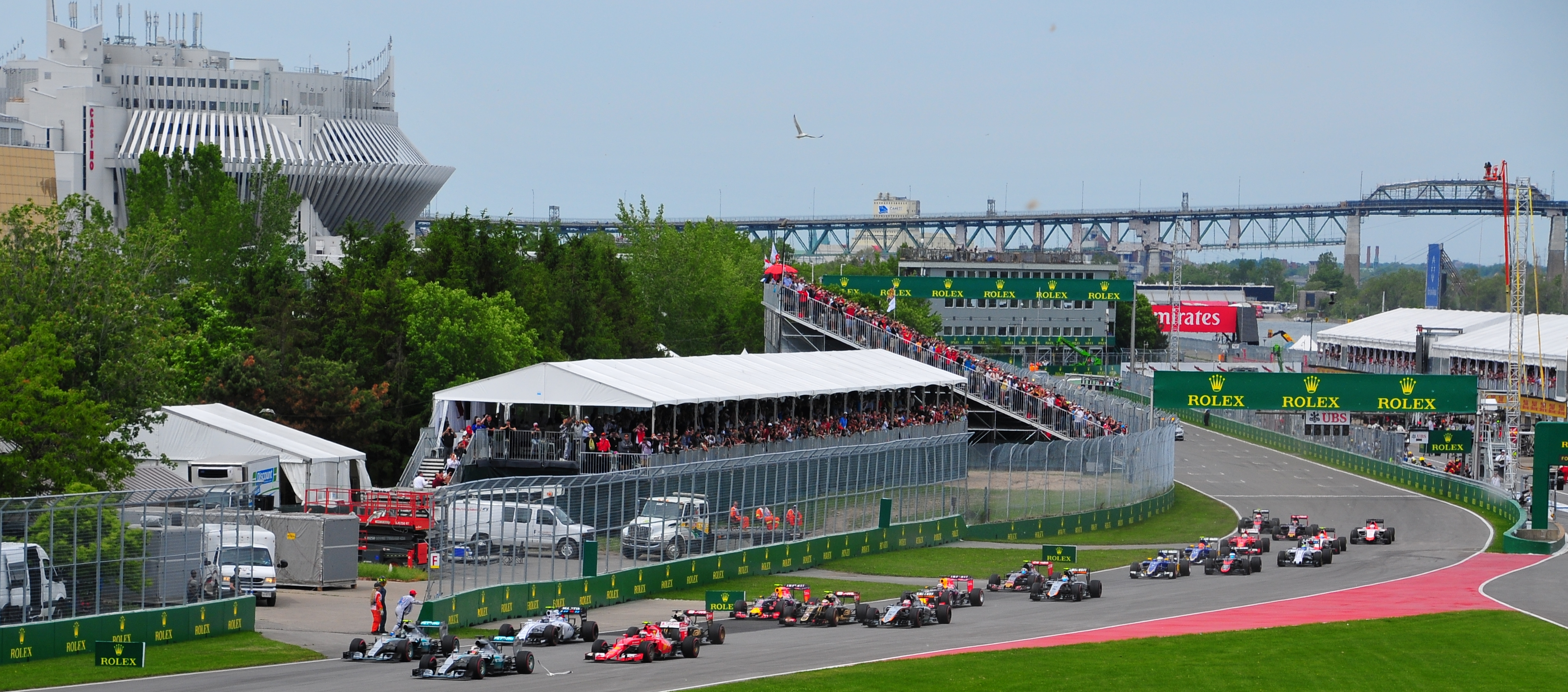
Montreal is the site of the Canadian Grand Prix, an annual Formula One auto race.

CF Montréal (formerly known as the Montreal Impact) are the city's professional soccer team. They play at a soccer-specific stadium called Saputo Stadium. They joined Major League Soccer in 2012. The Montreal games of the 2007 FIFA U-20 World Cup and 2014 FIFA U-20 Women's World Cup were held at Olympic Stadium, and the venue hosted Montreal games in the 2015 FIFA Women's World Cup.

Montreal is the site of a high-profile auto racing event each year: the Canadian Grand Prix of Formula One (F1) racing. This race takes place on the Circuit Gilles Villeneuve on Île Notre-Dame. In 2009, the race was dropped from the Formula One calendar, to the chagrin of some fans, but the Canadian Grand Prix returned to the Formula One calendar in 2010. It was dropped from the calendar again in 2020 and 2021, due to COVID-19 pandemic, but racing resumed in 2022, with the 2022 Canadian Grand Prix. The Circuit Gilles Villeneuve also hosted a round of the Champ Car World Series from 2002 to 2007, and was home to the NAPA Auto Parts 200, a NASCAR Nationwide Series race, and the Montréal 200, a Grand Am Rolex Sports Car Series race.

Uniprix Stadium, built in 1993 on the site of Jarry Park, is used for the National Bank Open (formerly known as the Rogers Cup) men's and women's tennis tournaments. The men's tournament is a Masters 1000 event on the ATP Tour, and the women's tournament is a Premier tournament on the WTA Tour. The men's and women's tournaments alternate between Montreal and Toronto every year.

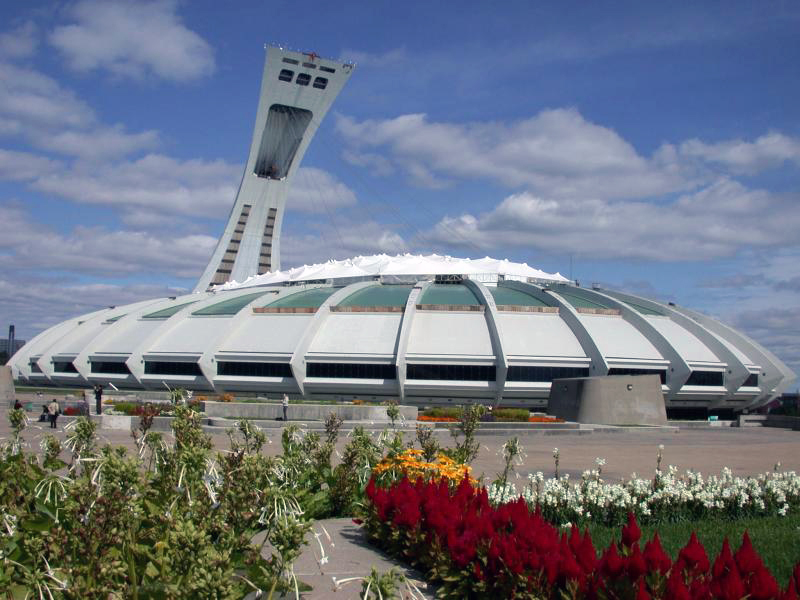
The Olympic Stadium was built for the 1976 Summer Olympics in Montreal. It is used by MLS's CF Montréal for select games.

Montreal was the host of the 1976 Summer Olympic Games. The stadium cost $1.5 billion; with interest that figure ballooned to nearly $3 billion, and was paid off in December 2006. Montreal also hosted the first ever World Outgames in the summer of 2006, attracting over 16,000 participants engaged in 35 sporting activities.

Montreal was the host city for the 17th unicycling world championship and convention (UNICON) in August 2014. The city was also the host of the UCI Road World Championships in September 2026.

== Media ==
Montreal is Canada's second-largest media market, and the centre of Canada's francophone media industry.

There are four over-the-air English-language television stations: CBMT-DT (CBC Television), CFCF-DT (CTV), CKMI-DT (Global) and CJNT-DT (Citytv). There are also five over-the-air French-language television stations: CBFT-DT (Ici Radio-Canada), CFTM-DT (TVA), CFJP-DT (Noovo), CIVM-DT (Télé-Québec), and CFTU-DT (Canal Savoir).

Montreal has three daily newspapers, the English-language Montreal Gazette and the French-language Le Journal de Montréal, and Le Devoir; another French-language daily, La Presse, became an online daily in 2018. There are two free French dailies, Métro and 24 Heures. Montreal has numerous weekly tabloids and community newspapers serving various neighbourhoods, ethnic groups and schools.

== Government ==
The head of the city government in Montreal is the mayor, who is first among equals in the city council. As of 2026, the mayor is Soraya Martinez Ferrada.

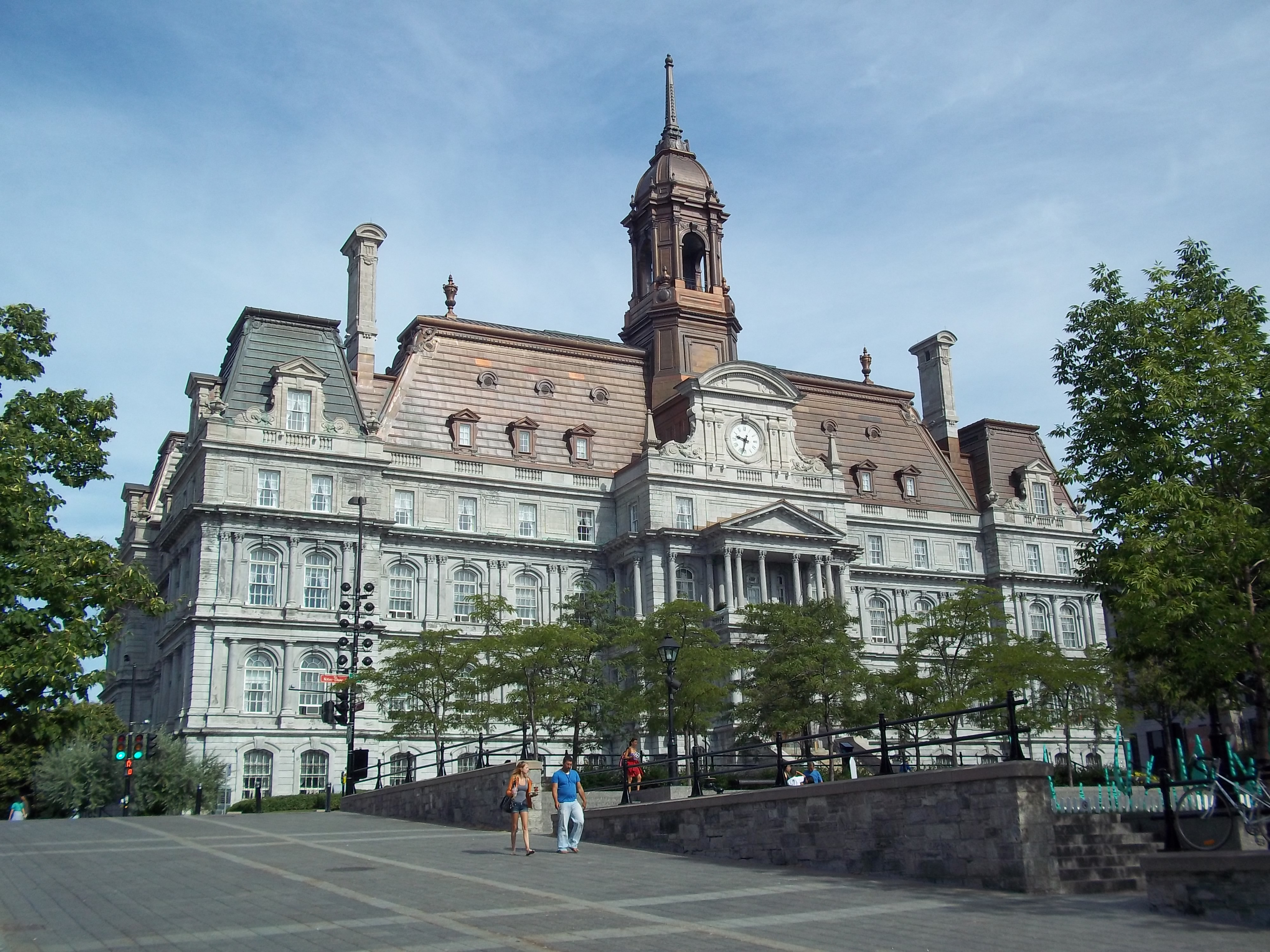
Completed in 1878, Montreal City Hall is the seat of local government.

The city council is a democratically elected institution and is the final decision-making authority in the city, although much power is centralized in the executive committee. The council consists of 65 members from all boroughs. The council has jurisdiction over many matters, including public security, agreements with other governments, subsidy programs, the environment, urban planning, and a three-year capital expenditure program. The council is required to supervise, standardize or approve certain decisions made by the borough councils.

Reporting directly to the council, the executive committee exercises decision-making powers similar to those of the cabinet in a parliamentary system and is responsible for preparing various documents including budgets and by-laws, submitted to the council for approval. The decision-making powers of the executive committee cover, in particular, the awarding of contracts or grants, the management of human and financial resources, supplies and buildings. It may also be assigned further powers by the city council.

Standing committees are the prime instruments for public consultation. They are responsible for the public study of pending matters and for making the appropriate recommendations to the council. They also review the annual budget forecasts for departments under their jurisdiction. A public notice of meeting is published in both French and English daily newspapers at least seven days before each meeting. All meetings include a public question period. The standing committees, of which there are seven, have terms lasting two years. In addition, the City Council may decide to create special committees at any time. Each standing committee is made up of seven to nine members, including a chairman and a vice-chairman. The members are all elected municipal officers, with the exception of a representative of the government of Quebec on the public security committee.

The city is only one component of the larger Montreal Metropolitan Community (Communauté Métropolitaine de Montréal, CMM), which is in charge of planning, coordinating, and financing economic development, public transportation, garbage collection and waste management, etc., across the metropolitan area. The president of the CMM is the mayor of Montreal. The CMM covers 4,360 km^{2} (1,680 sq mi), with 3.6 million inhabitants in 2006.

Montreal is the seat of the judicial district of Montreal, which includes the city and the other communities on the island.

The island of Montreal elects 18 Members of Parliament to the House of Commons in Ottawa.

Montréal federal election results
Year	Liberal		Conservative		Bloc Québécois		New Democratic		Green	
2021	48%	348,308	9%	64,857	19%	133,718	18%	132,395	2%	14,565
2019	48%	377,036	8%	63,376	20%	156,398	16%	129,517	6%	45,845

Montréal provincial election results
Year	CAQ		Liberal		QC solidaire		Parti Québécois	
2018	18%	119,806	38%	254,069	25%	164,153	13%	89,353
2014	11%	81,844	54%	414,477	14%	106,335	19%	149,792

== Policing ==
Law enforcement on the island itself is provided by the Service de Police de la Ville de Montréal, or the SPVM for short.

== Crime ==
Since 1975, when Montreal's homicide rate peaked at around 10.3 per 100,000 people with a total of 112 murders, the overall crime rate in Montreal has declined, with a few notable exceptions, reaching a minimum in 2016 with 23 murders. Sex crimes have increased 14.5 per cent between 2015 and 2016 and fraud cases have increased by 13 per cent over the same period. The major criminal organizations active in Montreal are the Rizzuto crime family, Hells Angels and West End Gang. However, in the 2020s, the city has seen an increase in overall crime, with a notable increase in homicides. 25 homicides were reported in 2020 which matched the number reported in 2019. The next year saw a 48% increase in murders with a total of 37 in 2021, giving the city a homicide rate of around 2.1 per 100,000 people. The Montreal Police Annual Report for 2021 showed that there were 144 shootings across the city, or an average of one shooting every 2.5 days. In comparison, there were 71 shootings recorded the year before. 2022 saw another 10.8% increase in homicides, with a total of 41 being reported (giving a slightly higher homicide rate of 2.3 per 100,000 people), the highest number since 2007, when there were 42. In 2025, the Greater Montreal’s homicide rate was 1.16 per 100,000 inhabitants, with 31 homicides in Montreal alone.

== Education ==
The education system in Quebec is different from other systems in North America. Between high school (which ends at grade 11) and university, students must go through an additional school called CEGEP. CEGEPs offer pre-university (2-years) and technical (3-years) programs. In Montreal, seventeen CEGEPs offer courses in French and five in English.

French-language elementary and secondary public schools in Montreal are operated by the Centre de services scolaire de Montréal (CSSDM), Centre de services scolaire Marguerite-Bourgeoys and the Centre de services scolaire de la Pointe-de-l'Île.

English-language elementary and secondary public schools on Montreal Island are operated by the English Montreal School Board and the Lester B. Pearson School Board.

With four universities, ten other degree-awarding institutions, and 12 CEGEPs in an 8 km (5.0 mi) radius, Montreal has the highest concentration of post-secondary students of all major cities in North America (4.38 students per 100 residents, followed by Boston at 4.37 students per 100 residents).

=== Higher education in English ===
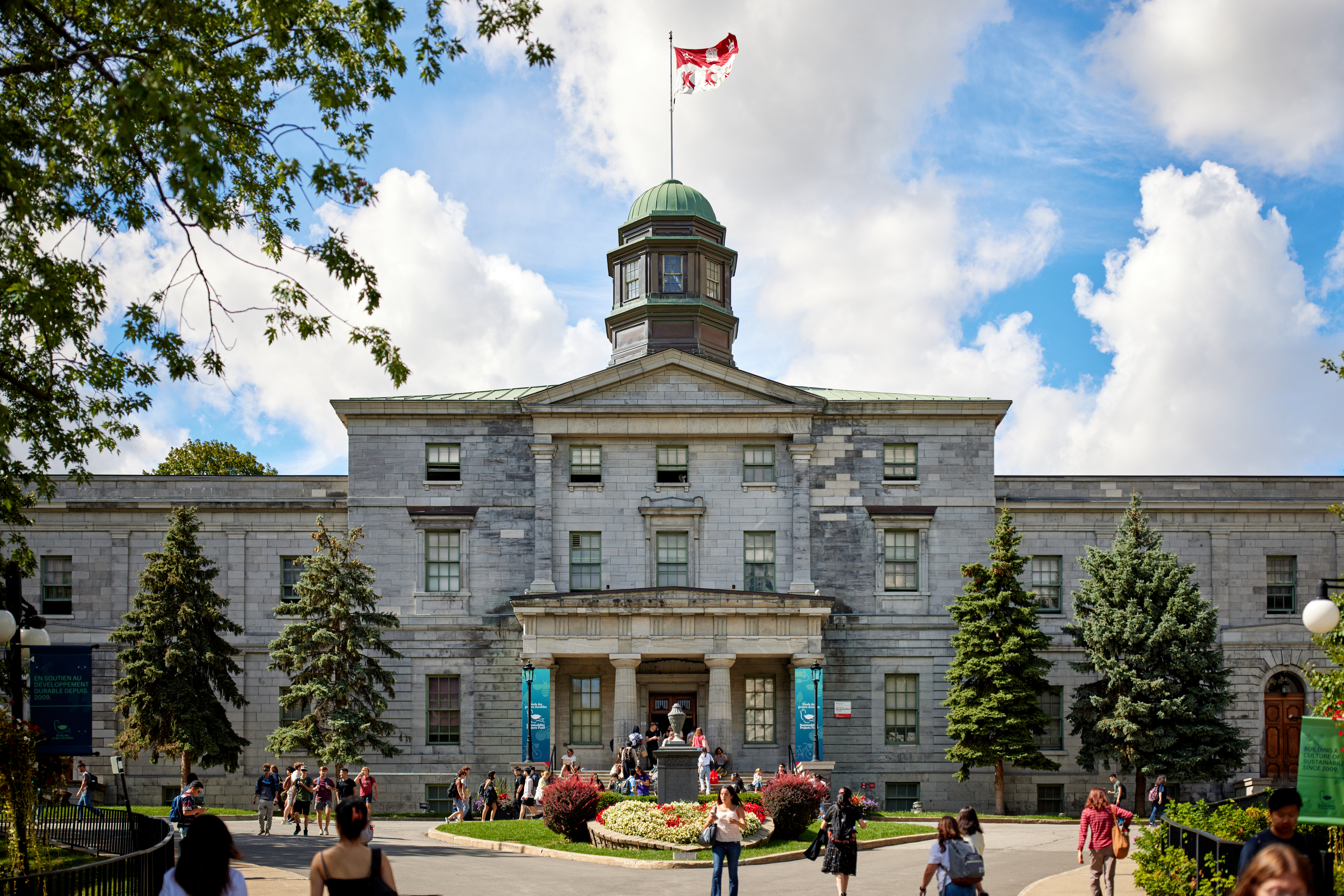
Established in 1821, McGill University is the oldest operating university in Montreal.

- McGill University is one of Canada's leading post-secondary institutions and is widely regarded as a world-class institution.
- Concordia University was created from the merger of Sir George Williams University and Loyola College in 1974.

=== Higher education in French ===
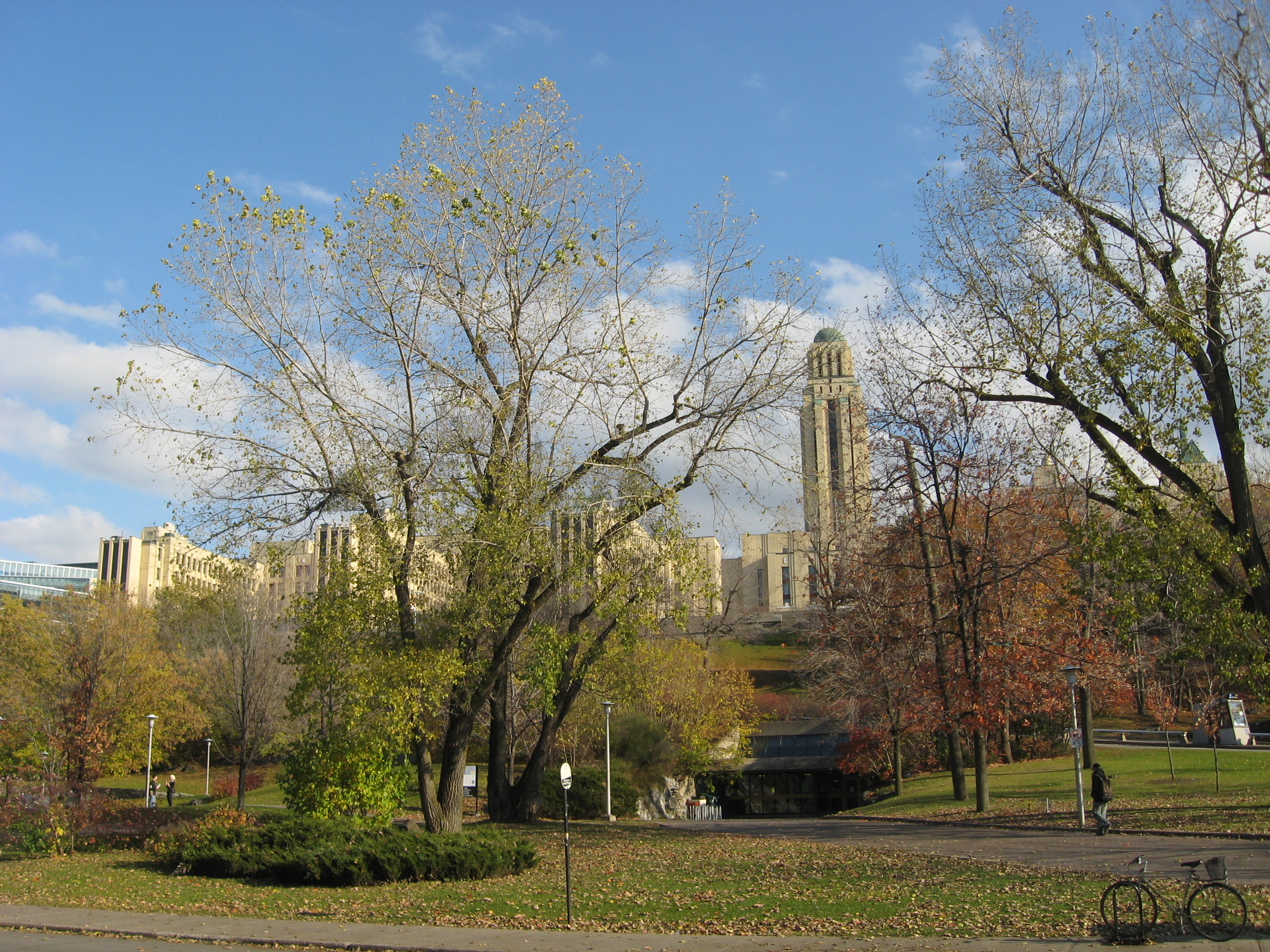
Université de Montréal from the Montreal Metro station. The institution is the largest university in the city.

- Université de Montréal (UdeM) is the second largest research university in Canada. Two separate institutions are affiliated to the university: the École Polytechnique Montréal (School of Engineering) and HEC Montréal (School of Business). HEC Montréal was founded in 1907.
- Université du Québec à Montréal (UQAM) is the Montreal campus of Université du Québec. UQAM generally specializes in liberal arts, although many programs related to the sciences are available.
  - The Université du Québec network also has three separately run schools in Montreal, notably the École de technologie supérieure (ETS), the École nationale d'administration publique (ÉNAP) and the Institut national de la recherche scientifique (INRS).
- L'Institut de formation théologique de Montréal des Prêtres de Saint-Sulpice (IFTM) specializes in theology and philosophy.
- Institut d'hôtellerie et de tourisme du Québec (IHTQ) offers an Applied Bachelor in Hospitality and Hotel Management.
- Conservatoire de musique du Québec à Montréal offers both a Bachelor and a Master program in classical music.

Additionally, two French-language universities, Université de Sherbrooke and Université Laval have campuses in the nearby suburb of Longueuil on Montreal's south shore. The Faculté de théologie évangélique is Nova Scotia's Acadia University Montreal based serving French Protestant community in Canada by offering both a Bachelor and a Master program in theology

== Transportation ==
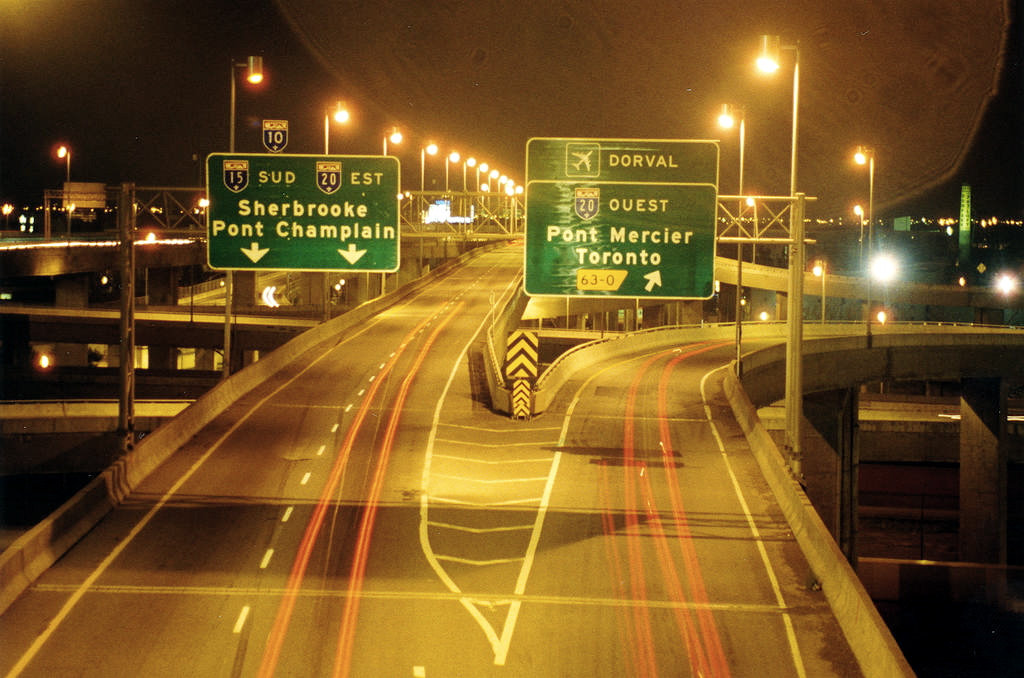
Montreal is a hub for Quebec's autoroute system of controlled-access highways.

Like many major cities, Montreal has a problem with vehicular traffic congestion. Commuting traffic from the cities and towns in the West Island (such as Dollard-des-Ormeaux and Pointe-Claire) is compounded by commuters entering the city that use twenty-four road crossings from numerous off-island suburbs on the North and South Shores. The width of the Saint Lawrence River has made the construction of fixed links to the south shore expensive and difficult. There are presently four road bridges (including two of the country's busiest) along with one bridge-tunnel, two railway bridges, and a metro line. The far narrower Rivière des Prairies to the city's north, separating Montreal from Laval, is spanned by nine road bridges (seven to the city of Laval and two that span directly to the north shore) and a Metro line.

The island of Montreal is a hub for the Quebec Autoroute system, and is served by Quebec Autoroutes A-10 (known as the Bonaventure Expressway on the island of Montreal), A-15 (aka the Décarie Expressway south of the A-40 and the Laurentian Autoroute to the north of it), A-13 (aka Chomedey Autoroute), A-20, A-25, A-40 (part of the Trans-Canada Highway system, and known as "The Metropolitan" or simply "The Met" in its elevated mid-town section), A-520 and R-136 (aka the Ville-Marie Autoroute). Many of these Autoroutes are frequently congested at rush hour. However, in recent years, the government has acknowledged this problem and is working on long-term solutions to alleviate the congestion. One such example is the extension of Quebec Autoroute 30 on Montreal's south shore, which will be a bypass for trucks and intercity traffic.

=== Société de transport de Montréal ===
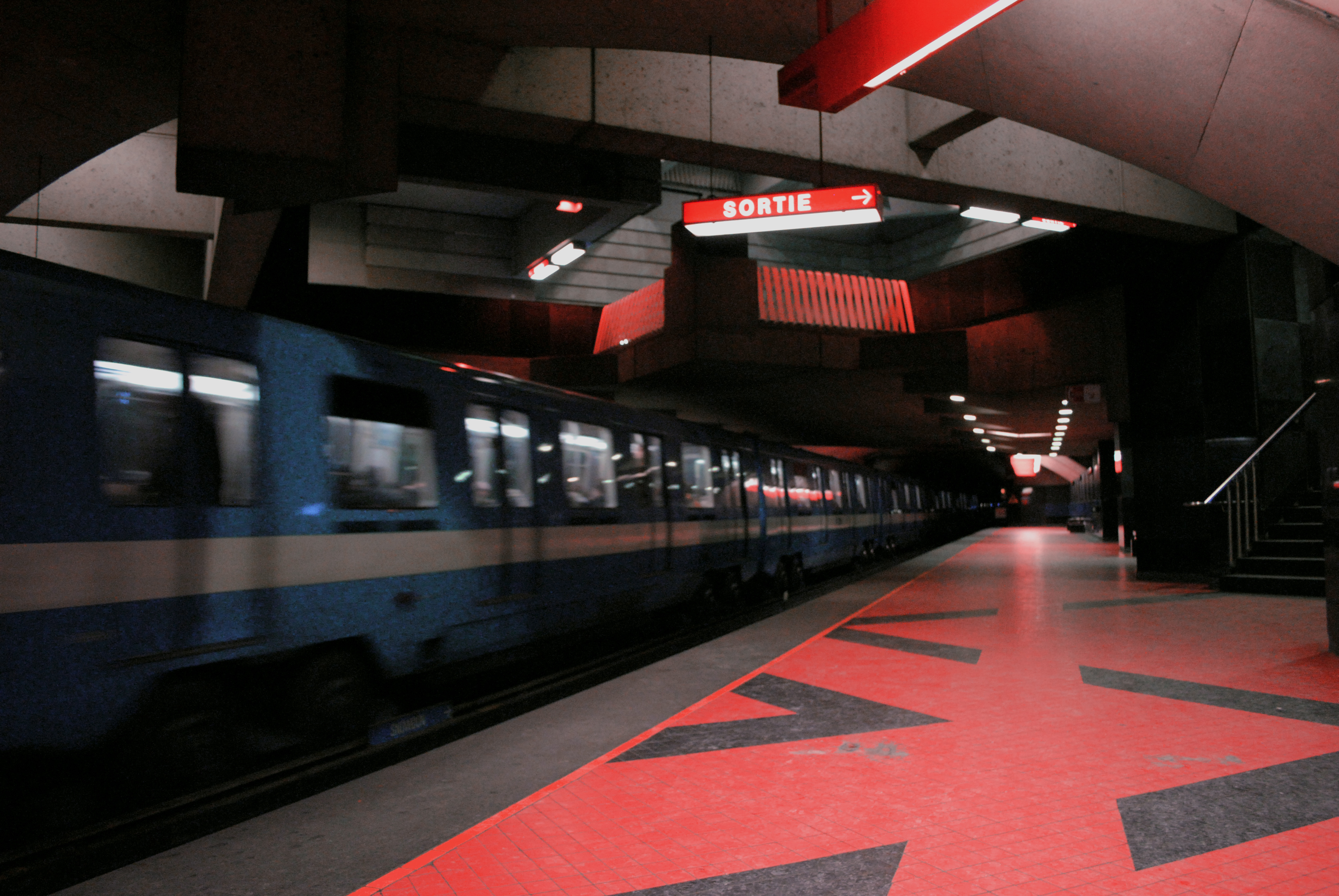
A train departs from Acadie station. The Montreal Metro has 68 stations and four lines.

Public local transport is served by a network of buses, subways, and commuter trains that extend across and off the island. The subway and bus system are operated by the Société de transport de Montréal (STM, 'Montreal Transit Company'). The STM bus network consists of 203 daytime and 23 night time routes. STM bus routes serve 1,347,900 passengers on an average weekday in 2010. It also provides adapted transport and wheelchair-accessible buses. The STM won the award of Outstanding Public Transit System in North America by the APTA in 2010. It was the first time a Canadian company won this prize.

The Metro was inaugurated in 1966 and has 68 stations on four lines. Total daily passengers is 1,050,800 passengers on an average weekday (as of Q1 2010). Each station was designed by different architects with individual themes and features original artwork, and the trains run on rubber tires, making the system quieter than most. The project was initiated by Montreal Mayor Jean Drapeau, who later brought the Summer Olympic Games to Montreal in 1976. The Metro system has long had a station on the South Shore in Longueuil, and in 2007 was extended to the city of Laval, north of Montreal, with three new stations. Starting in 2019, the metro has been modernizing its trains, running new Azur models with inter-connected wagons.

=== Air ===
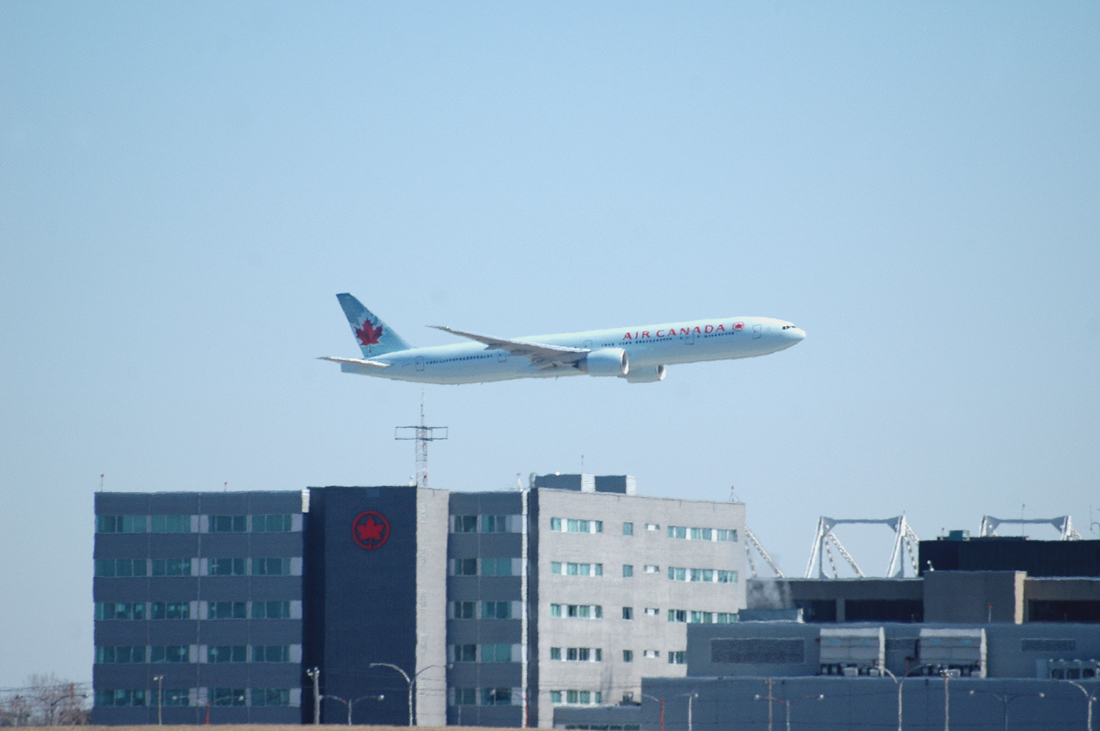
An Air Canada flight flies past the company's corporate headquarters, at Montréal–Trudeau International Airport.

Montreal has two international airports, one for passengers only, the other for cargo. Pierre Elliott Trudeau International Airport (also known as Dorval Airport) in the City of Dorval serves all commercial passenger traffic and is the headquarters of Air Canada and Air Transat. To the north of the city is Montreal Mirabel International Airport in Mirabel, which was envisioned as Montreal's primary airport but which now serves cargo flights along with MEDEVACs and general aviation and some passenger services. In 2018, Trudeau was the third busiest airport in Canada by passenger traffic and aircraft movements, handling 19.42 million passengers, and 240,159 aircraft movements. With 63% of its passengers being on non-domestic flights it has the largest percentage of international flights of any Canadian airport.

It is one of Air Canada's major hubs and operates on average approximately 2,400 flights per week between Montreal and 155 destinations, spread on five continents.

Airlines servicing Trudeau offer year-round non-stop flights to five continents, namely Africa, Asia, Europe, North America and South America. It is one of only two airports in Canada with direct flights to five continents or more.

=== Rail ===
Montreal-based Via Rail Canada provides rail service to other cities in Canada, particularly to Quebec City and Toronto along the Quebec City – Windsor Corridor. Amtrak, the U.S. national passenger rail system, operates its Adirondack daily to New York. All intercity trains and most commuter trains operate out of Central Station.

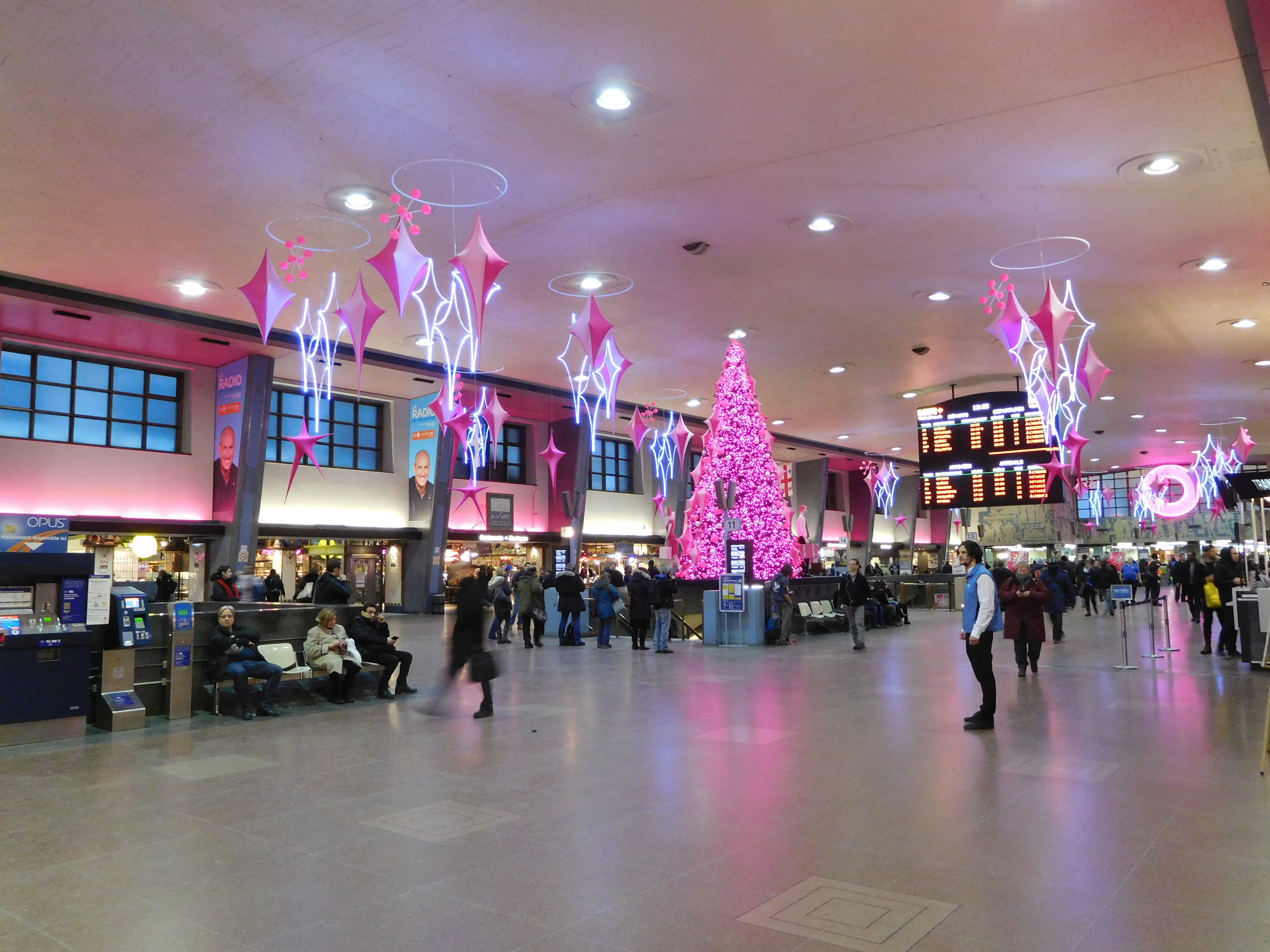
Central Station is a major inter-city and commuter rail hub for the city.

Canadian Pacific Railway (CPR) was founded here in 1881. Its corporate headquarters occupied Windsor Station at 910 Peel Street until 1995, when it moved to Calgary, Alberta. With the Port of Montreal kept open year-round by icebreakers, lines to Eastern Canada became surplus, and now Montreal is the eastern and intermodal freight terminus of CPR's successor company, Canadian Pacific Kansas City (CPKC). CPKC connects at Montreal with the Port of Montreal, the Delaware and Hudson Railway to New York, the Quebec Gatineau Railway to Quebec City and Buckingham, the Central Maine and Quebec Railway to Halifax, and Canadian National Railway (CN). The CPR's flagship train, The Canadian, ran daily from Windsor Station to Vancouver, but in 1978 all passenger services were transferred to Via. Since 1990, The Canadian has terminated in Toronto instead of in Montreal.

Montreal-based CN was formed in 1919 by the Canadian government following a series of country-wide rail bankruptcies. It was formed from the Grand Trunk, Midland and Canadian Northern Railways, and has risen to become CPR's chief rival in freight carriage in Canada. Like the CPR, CN divested itself of passenger services in favour of Via. CN's flagship train, the Super Continental, ran daily from Central Station to Vancouver and subsequently became a Via train in 1978. It was eliminated in 1990 in favour of rerouting The Canadian.

The commuter rail system is managed and operated by Exo, and reaches the outlying areas of Greater Montreal with five lines. It carried an average of 79,000 daily passengers in 2014, making it the seventh busiest in North America following New York, Chicago, Toronto, Boston, Philadelphia, and Mexico City.

On April 22, 2016, the forthcoming automated rapid transit system, the Réseau express métropolitain (REM), was unveiled. Groundbreaking occurred April 12, 2018, and construction of the 67-kilometre-long (42 mi) network – consisting of three branches, 26 stations, and the conversion of the region's busiest commuter railway – commenced the following month. The first branch was opened on July 31, 2023, following another extension of the current branch on November 17, 2025. Two more phases are planned to open as of 2025, the REM will be fully completed by 2027, becoming the fourth largest automated rapid transit network after the Dubai Metro, the Singapore Mass Rapid Transit, and the Vancouver SkyTrain. Most of it will be financed by pension fund manager Caisse de dépôt et placement du Québec (CDPQ Infra).

=== Bike Share Program ===
Montreal is considered to be one of the most cyclist-friendly cities in North America and around the world, thanks in part to the city's successful bike share system, BIXI. First launched in 2009 with Montreal-based PBSC Urban Solutions ICONIC bikes, BIXI has since expanded its fleet to 13,000 bikes, including 3,500 electric bikes, and over 1,000 docking stations. BIXI has also continually expanded the territory it serves, now servicing parts of the Greater Montreal Area, including Laval, Longueuil, and Terrebonne, among others. In what the STM states is a mission to combine different forms of mobility, transit card holders can now take advantage of their membership to also rent bicycles at select stations.

== International relations ==
=== Sister cities ===
- Algiers, Algeria – 1999
- Barcelona, Spain
- Brussels, Belgium
- Bucharest, Romania
- Busan, South Korea – 2000
- Boston, United States – 1995
- Düsseldorf, Germany – 2015
- Guadalajara, Mexico – 2004
- Hanoi, Vietnam – 1997
- Hiroshima, Japan – 1998
- Lyon, France – 1979
- Manila, Philippines – 2005
- Melbourne, Australia – 2007
- Port-au-Prince, Haiti – 1995
- Quito, Ecuador – 1997
- Rio de Janeiro, Brazil – 1998
- San Salvador, El Salvador – 2001
- Shanghai, China – 1985
- Tunis, Tunisia – 1999
- Yerevan, Armenia – 1998

=== Friendship cities ===
- Paris, France – 2006

== See also ==
- List of people from Montreal
- List of anglophone communities in Quebec
- List of mayors of Montreal
- List of Montreal music venues
- List of shopping malls in Montreal
- List of tallest buildings in Montreal
- Montreal International Games Summit
- Order of Montreal
- Royal eponyms in Canada
