= MTELUS (concert hall) =

Arts centre in Montreal

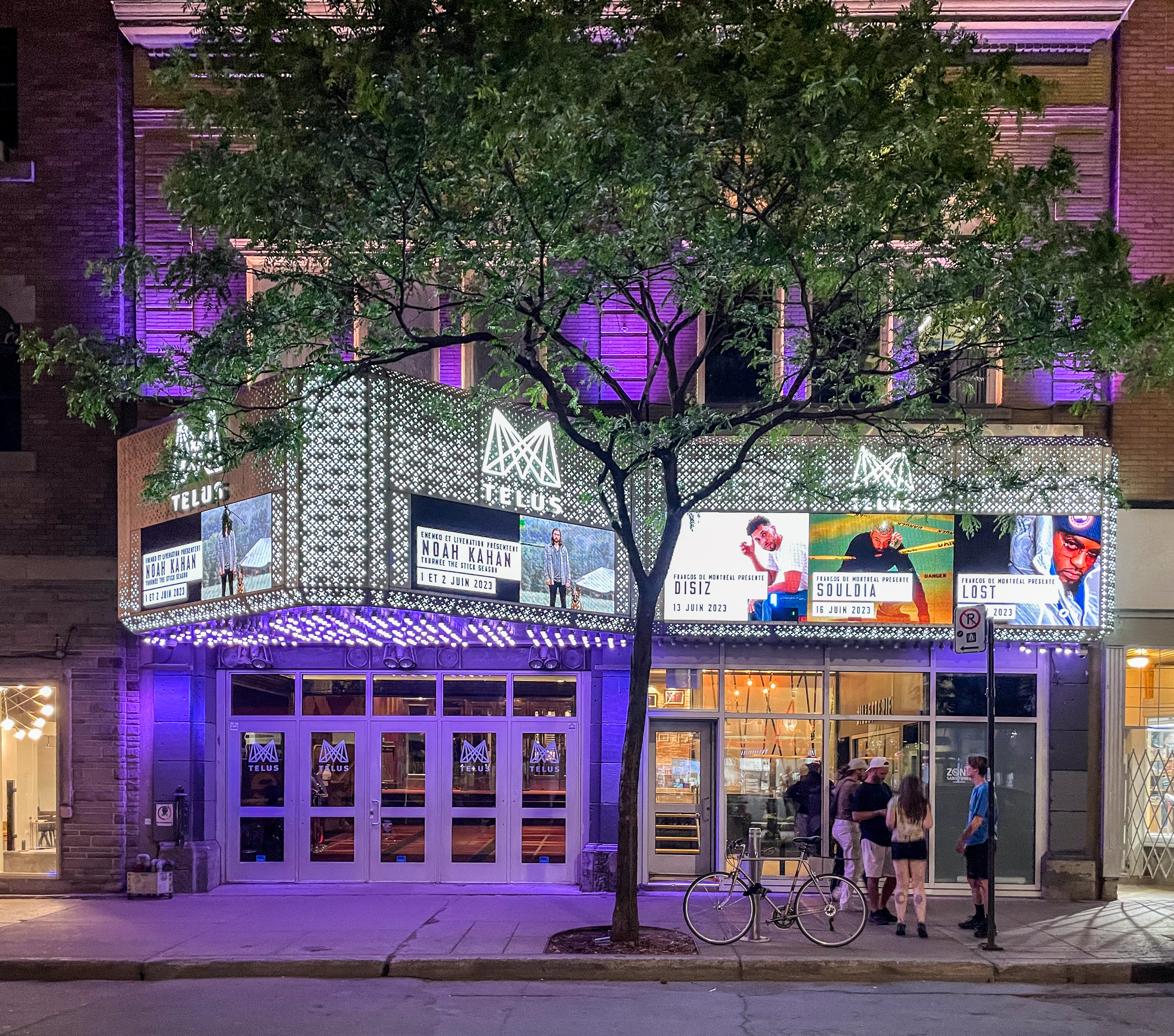
- Exterior of venue (2023)
- Interactive map of MTELUS
- Former names: Métropolis (1987-2017)
- Address: 59, rue Sainte-Catherine Est; Montreal, Quebec; H2X 1K5
- Coordinates: 45.5106°N 73.5634°W
- Owner: L'Équipe Spectra
- Operator: Evenko
- Capacity: 2,300

Website
- Venue Website

The MTELUS (formerly known as Métropolis) is a performing arts centre in Montreal, Quebec, Canada. It is located in the central part of the downtown core, on Saint Catherine Street East between Saint-Dominique and De Bullion Streets, in the Quartier des Spectacles. The hall primarily features rock music groups, and is a venue for several festivals, including the Montreal International Jazz Festival and the FrancoFolies de Montréal.

It can accommodate up to 2,350 people. The venue is within walking distance from Place-des-Arts Metro station, the Complexe Desjardins in the west and from the Saint-Laurent metro station. In 2011, the venue was ranked as the ninth most popular club venue worldwide in ticket sales.

In 2016, naming rights were acquired by Telus. The telecommunications company plans to invest $5 million in improvements to the club over the next decade, as part of its corporate rebranding effort.

== History ==
The venue opened in 1884. It was first a skating rink and became a summer theatre the following year under the name "Theatre Français".

Completely damaged by a fire at the end of the 19th century, the building was bought in 1920 by an American company, the Loew's chain (now known as Loews Cineplex Entertainment), which first turned it into a theatre under the name "The Loew's Court" and then into a movie theatre in 1923. A year later, the name reverted to the "Theatre Français" before the theatre was partially damaged by fire again in 1930.

Purchased by United Amusement, it was fully renovated and decorated by Emmanuel Briffa who was also responsible for the design of the Outremont Theatre. The building became a theater again before housing an adult cinema under the name "Eros" through the 1970s until 1981, when it shut down. Six years later, under the name "Metropolis", it reopened as a dance club.

Following acquisition of the building in 1997 by L'Équipe Spectra, Métropolis became a live performance venue, hosting artists like David Bowie, Beck, Alice in Chains, Les Rita Mitsouko, Green Day, the White Stripes, Björk, Bran Van 3000, Ben Harper, Nickelback, Prince, Radiohead, Coldplay, Corneille, City and Colour, Les Cowboys Fringants and Jean Leloup—the artist who has performed the most concerts in the venue. Popular game show La Fureur has also filmed there on several occasions.

As part of a partnership with Telus Mobility, the venue was officially renamed from Métropolis to MTELUS in May 2017.

== Shooting ==
In the early morning of September 5, 2012, following the 2012 Quebec general election, the venue was the site of a victory rally for the Parti Québecois. During a speech by premier-designate Pauline Marois, a gunman named Richard Henry Bain infiltrated the building in an attempt to assassinate Marois. In his attempt, he killed a stagehand and wounded another man before being apprehended by police.
