= Downtown Montreal =

Neighbourhood, central business district of Montreal in Quebec, Canada

Downtown Montreal Centre-Ville de Montréal (French)
- Neighbourhood
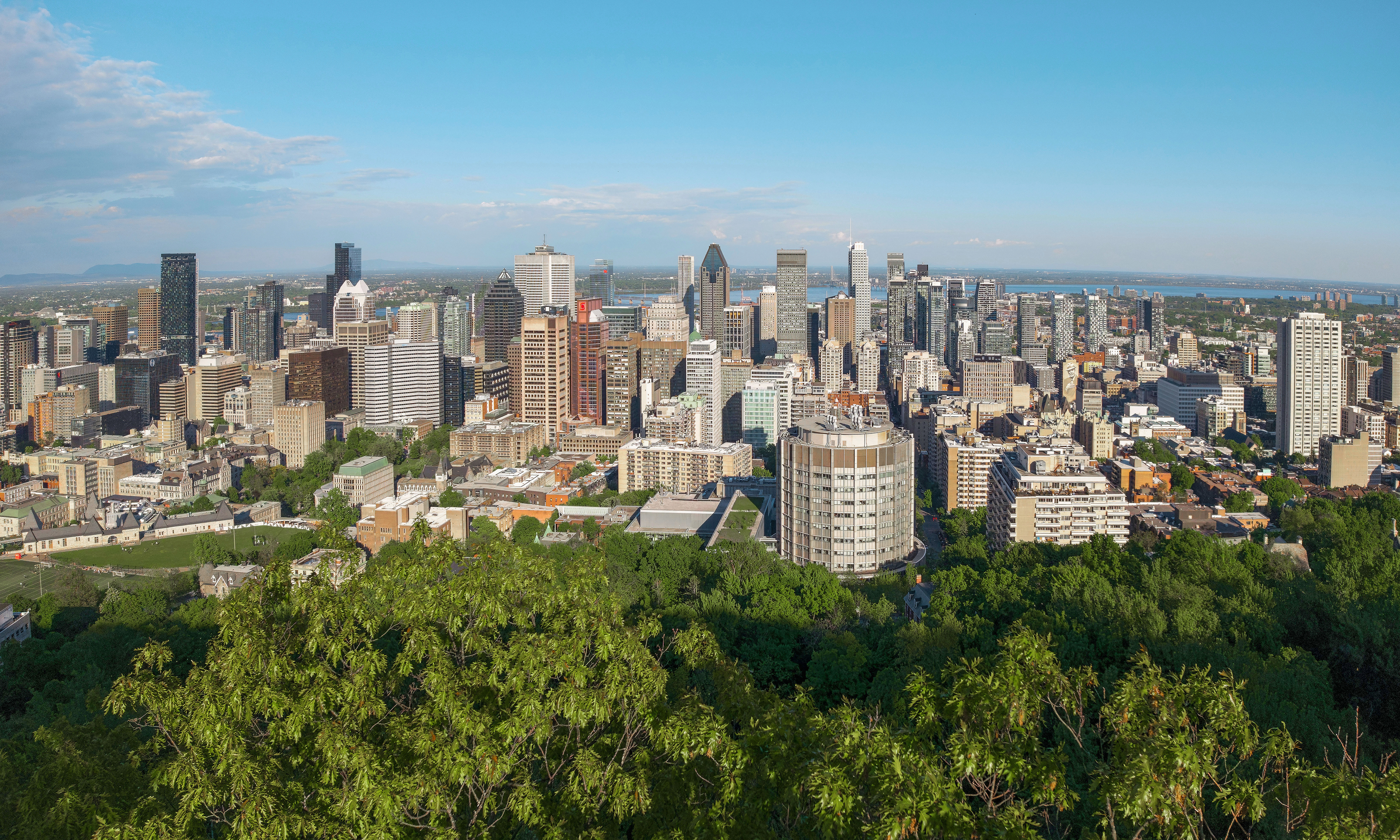
- Skyline of Downtown Montreal from Mount Royal in 2026

- Location of Downtown Montreal
- Coordinates: 45.50°N 73.57°W
- Country: Canada
- Province: Quebec
- City: Montreal
- Borough: Ville-Marie

Area
  - Total: 13.2 km^{2} (5.1 sq mi)
- Highest elevation: 234 m (768 ft)
- Lowest elevation: 20 m (66 ft)

Population (2021)
  - Total: 109,509
  - Density: 8,296/km^{2} (21,490/sq mi)
- Postal Code: H2Z, H3A, H3B, H3G, H3H, H4Z, H5A, H5B
- Area codes: 514, 438

Downtown Montreal (French: Centre-Ville de Montréal) is the central business district of Montreal, Quebec, Canada.

The district is situated on the southernmost slope of Mount Royal, and occupies the western portion of the borough of Ville-Marie. It is bounded by Mount Royal Park to the north, Le Plateau-Mont-Royal to the northeast, the Quartier Latin and Gay Village areas to the east, Old Montreal and the Cité du Multimédia to the south, Griffintown and Little Burgundy to the southwest, and the city of Westmount to the west.

The downtown region houses many corporate headquarters as well a large majority of the city's skyscrapers — which, by law, cannot be greater in height than Mount Royal in order to preserve the aesthetic predominance and intimidation factor of the mountain. The two tallest of these are the 1000 de La Gauchetière and 1250 René-Lévesque, both of which were built in 1992. The Tour de la Bourse is also a significant high-rise and is home to the Montreal Exchange that trades in derivatives. The Montreal Exchange was originally a stock exchange and was the first in Canada. In 1999, all stock trades were transferred to Toronto in exchange for an exclusivity in the derivative trading market.

Place Ville-Marie is a cruciform office tower designed by I. M. Pei. It was built in 1962, and sits atop an underground shopping mall that forms the nexus of Montreal's underground city, one of the world's largest. It has indoor access to over 1,600 shops, restaurants, offices, businesses, museums and universities, as well as metro stations, train stations, bus terminals, and tunnels extending all over downtown. The central axis for downtown is Saint Catherine Street, Canada's busiest commercial avenue. The area includes high end retail such as the Holt Renfrew Ogilvy department store as well as Les Cours Mont-Royal shopping centre. Other major streets include Sherbrooke Street, Peel, de la Montagne, de Maisonneuve and Crescent.

The skyline may be observed from one of two lookouts on Mount Royal. The lookout at the Belvedere takes in downtown, the river, and the Monteregian Hills. On clear days the Adirondack Mountains of Upstate New York are visible (the great-circle distance between Mount Royal and the U.S. border along a bee line normal to the border being only ~ 56 km, or ~ 35 miles), as are the Green Mountains of Vermont. The eastern lookout has a view of The Plateau neighbourhood, Olympic Stadium and beyond.

Downtown Montreal is also home to the main campuses of McGill University and UQAM and the Sir George Williams campus of Concordia University.

== Demographics ==
The Statistics Canada article Defining Canada's Downtown Neighbourhoods: 2016 Boundaries counted 88,169 people, and 299,245 jobs. The population density was approximately 66 people per hectare, while the job density was 226 jobs per hectare.

Most recently, the 2021 Canadian census counted 109,509 people living within Downtown Montreal's boundaries, an increase of 21,340 people. This 24.2 percent increase was the second-fastest growth within downtowns in Canada after Downtown Halifax. The population density increased from approximately 66 people per hectare in 2016 to approximately 82 people per hectare in 2021.

== Attractions ==
=== Museums ===
A number of museums can be found in or near Downtown Montreal, including the Canadian Centre for Architecture, McCord Museum, Montreal Museum of Contemporary Art, Montreal Museum of Fine Arts and Redpath Museum. Pointe-à-Callière Museum is more strictly in Old Montreal.

=== Religious buildings ===
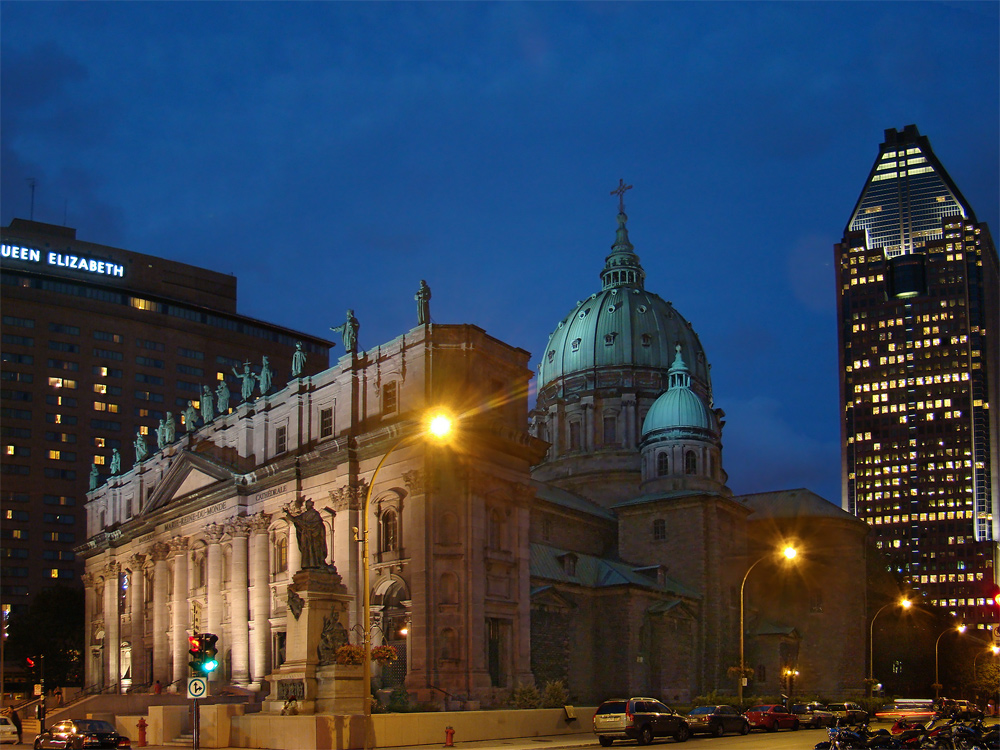
Mary, Queen of the World Cathedral is a Catholic minor basilica in Downtown Montreal.

Notable religious buildings in Downtown Montreal include: Christ Church Cathedral, Church of St. Andrew and St. Paul, Church of St. John the Evangelist, Mary, Queen of the World Cathedral, St. James the Apostle Anglican Church, St. James United Church, St. George's Anglican Church and St. Patrick's Basilica.

=== Sports and entertainment venues ===
The Bell Centre, used for ice hockey and other events, lies in the central/southern portion of Downtown Montreal. Place des Arts is located in the eastern part of the city's downtown, between Ste-Catherine and de Maisonneuve Streets, and St-Urbain and Jeanne-Mance streets, in an area now known as the Quartier des Spectacles, the complex is home to the Montreal Symphony Orchestra, Les Grands Ballets Canadiens, and the Opéra de Montréal. Percival Molson Memorial Stadium lies just to the North of Pine Avenue at the edge of Downtown Montreal.

=== Squares ===
Public space in Downtown Montreal includes the following squares: Cabot Square, Chaboillez Square, Dorchester Square, Norman Bethune Square, Phillips Square, Place du Canada, Place Émilie-Gamelin, Place des Festivals, Place Jean-Paul Riopelle and Victoria Square.

== Transportation ==
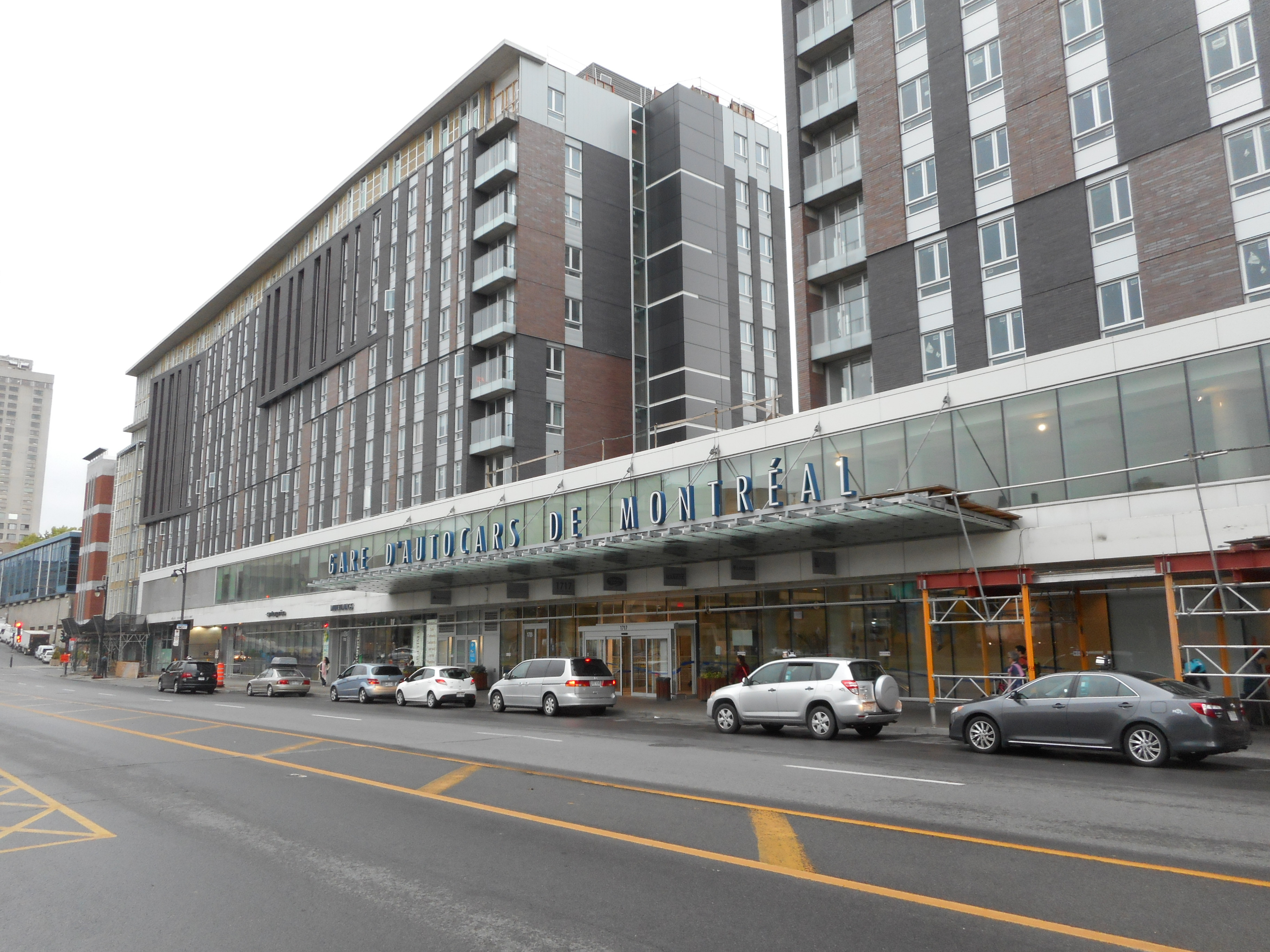
Gare d'autocars de Montréal is a major bus terminal located in Downtown Montreal.

Two railway stations are in Downtown Montreal: Central Station serves both intercity (VIA Rail and Amtrak) and Exo commuter rail services. Additional commuter services use Lucien-L'Allier station. Downtown Montreal also contains two bus stations: Gare d'autocars de Montréal serves mainly longer distance services, while Terminus Centre-Ville is mainly a terminus for services operated by RTL and Exo.

Two lines of the Montreal Metro run east–west through Downtown Montreal. Line 1 (Green) is aligned with De Maisonneuve Boulevard, serving (west to east): Atwater, Guy–Concordia, Peel, McGill, Place-des-Arts, Saint-Laurent and Berri–UQAM stations. Line 2 (Orange) runs some blocks south of the Green Line, serving (west to east) Lucien-L'Allier, Bonaventure, Square-Victoria–OACI, Place-d'Armes, Champ-de-Mars and Berri–UQAM. Place-d'Armes, Champ-de-Mars and Square-Victoria-OACI stations would usually be considered as in Old Montreal. Berri-UQAM is also the terminus for Line 4 (Yellow). Since 2023, downtown Montreal is served by the Réseau express métropolitain (REM) a new automated metro system. It’s only station in the downtown area is Gare Centrale providing a direct connection to the South Shore and eventually to the airport and other areas as the network expands.

== Economy ==
Air Canada was formerly headquartered in Downtown Montreal. In 1990, the airline announced that it was moving its headquarters from Downtown Montreal to Montreal-Trudeau Airport to cut costs.

== Education ==
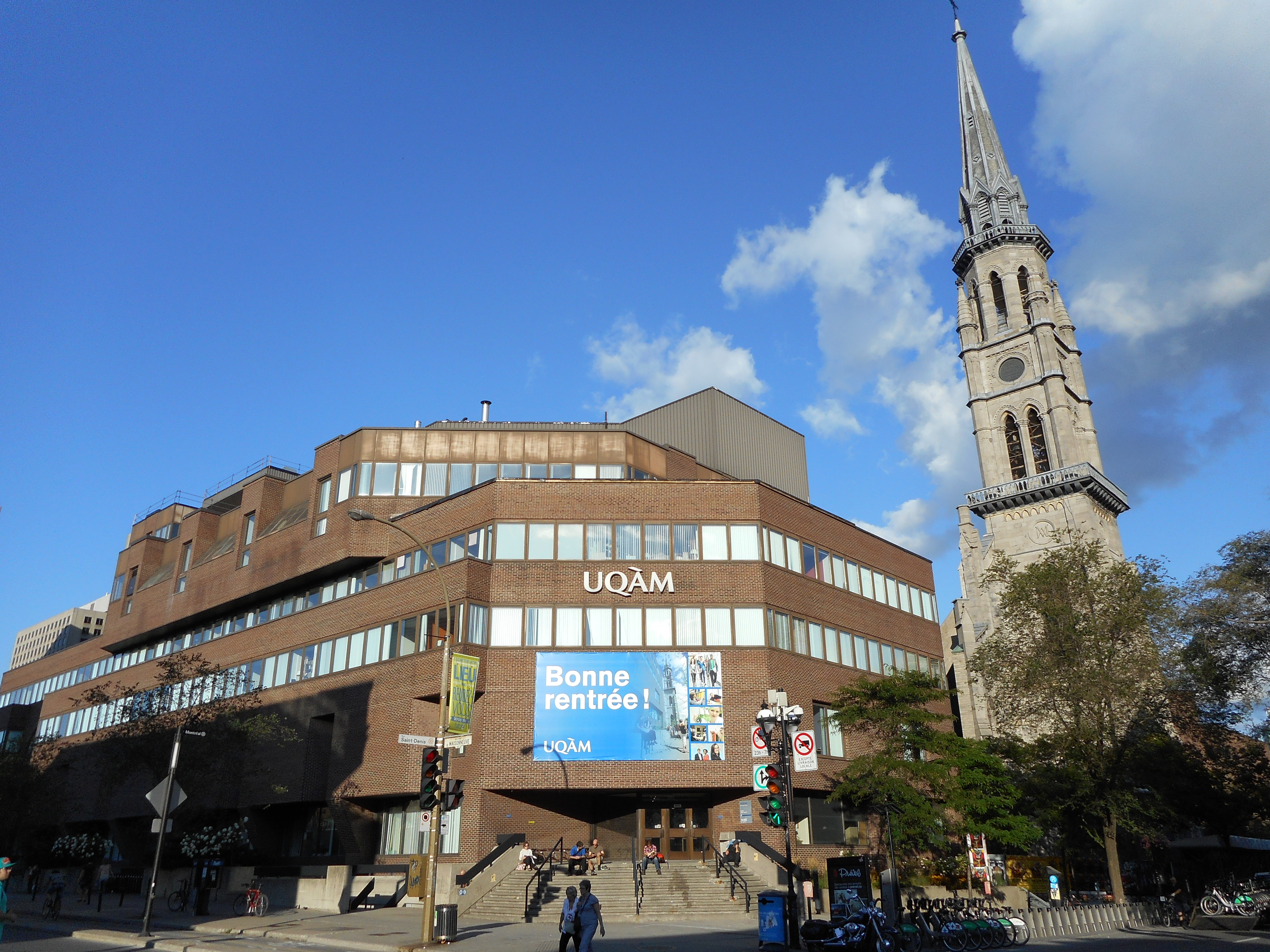
The Université du Québec à Montréal is one of several post-secondary institutions in Downtown Montreal.

Portions of four university-level establishments lie within Downtown Montreal: the main campus of McGill University, on the northern side of Sherbrooke Street; the Sir George Williams Campus of Concordia University in an area identified as Quartier Concordia in the western part of Downtown Montreal; École de technologie supérieure (a part of Université du Québec system) located near the southern edge of Downtown Montreal; and Université du Québec à Montréal, mainly in the Quartier Latin neighbourhood. Four colleges (pre-university) also lie in downtown: the public Cégep du Vieux Montréal on Ontario Street East; and the private colleges LaSalle College, O'Sullivan College and National Theatre School of Canada, including Monument-National, the venue used for its productions.

== Politics ==
Downtown Montreal is mostly in the federal electoral district of Ville-Marie—Le Sud-Ouest—Île-des-Sœurs, with some areas in the north around Mount Royal being in the district of Outremont and the eastern portion belonging to Laurier—Sainte-Marie. All three of these seats are currently held by members of the Liberal Party, with the former two in particular being safe Liberal seats.

Provincially, the downtown core is split in three pieces along similar boundaries, being mostly in the district of Westmount—Saint-Louis, with a small northern area in the provincial Mont-Royal—Outremont riding and the eastern areas being in Sainte-Marie—Saint-Jacques. The former two of these districts are current and safe seats for the Liberal Party of Quebec, while Sainte-Marie—Saint-Jacques is held by Manon Massé, one of the leaders of Québec solidaire.

== See also ==
- Underground City, Montreal
- Old Montreal
- Old Port of Montreal
