= ADISQ =

Nonprofit organization in Quebec, Canada

ADISQ (French: Association québécoise de l'industrie du disque, du spectacle et de la vidéo; English: Québec Association for the Recording, Concert and Video Industries) is a nonprofit organization whose mission is to support the independent music industry in Quebec. It was created in 1978.

Since 1979, it has also organized an annual awards ceremony for musicians and singers. The award bears the name Félix after famed singer-songwriter Félix Leclerc.

It is a member of the World Independent Network.

== History ==
Its first mission consisted of two goals to promote the Québec music industry:

- From its creation in 1978, the ADISQ has had the responsibility of organizing a collective stand (Musique du Québec) and coordinating member participation at the Marché International du Disque et de l'Edition Musicale
- Starting in 1979, it was to produce an annual televised gala that seeks to award artists, artisans, and professionals in the music industry. In addition to the main gala, the ADISQ also produced the Autre Gala (since 2003) and Gala de l'industrie (since 2009). Both ceremonies took place on the same day. In 2015 the name Autre Gala was changed to Le Premier Gala de l'ADISQ

Several years after realizing these objectives, its mission was changed to include lobbying the governments of Canada and Québec on the following issues:

- General policy pertaining to the recording, concert and video industries;
- Financing of these industries;
- The protection of artists' intellectual property;
- Broadcasting regulations.

The ADISQ initiated the urban project Quartier des Spectacles in Montréal. It was first unveiled in 2002 at the Sommet de Montréal by then-president Jacques K. Primeau.
