= Place-des-Arts station =

Montreal Metro station

Place-des-Arts
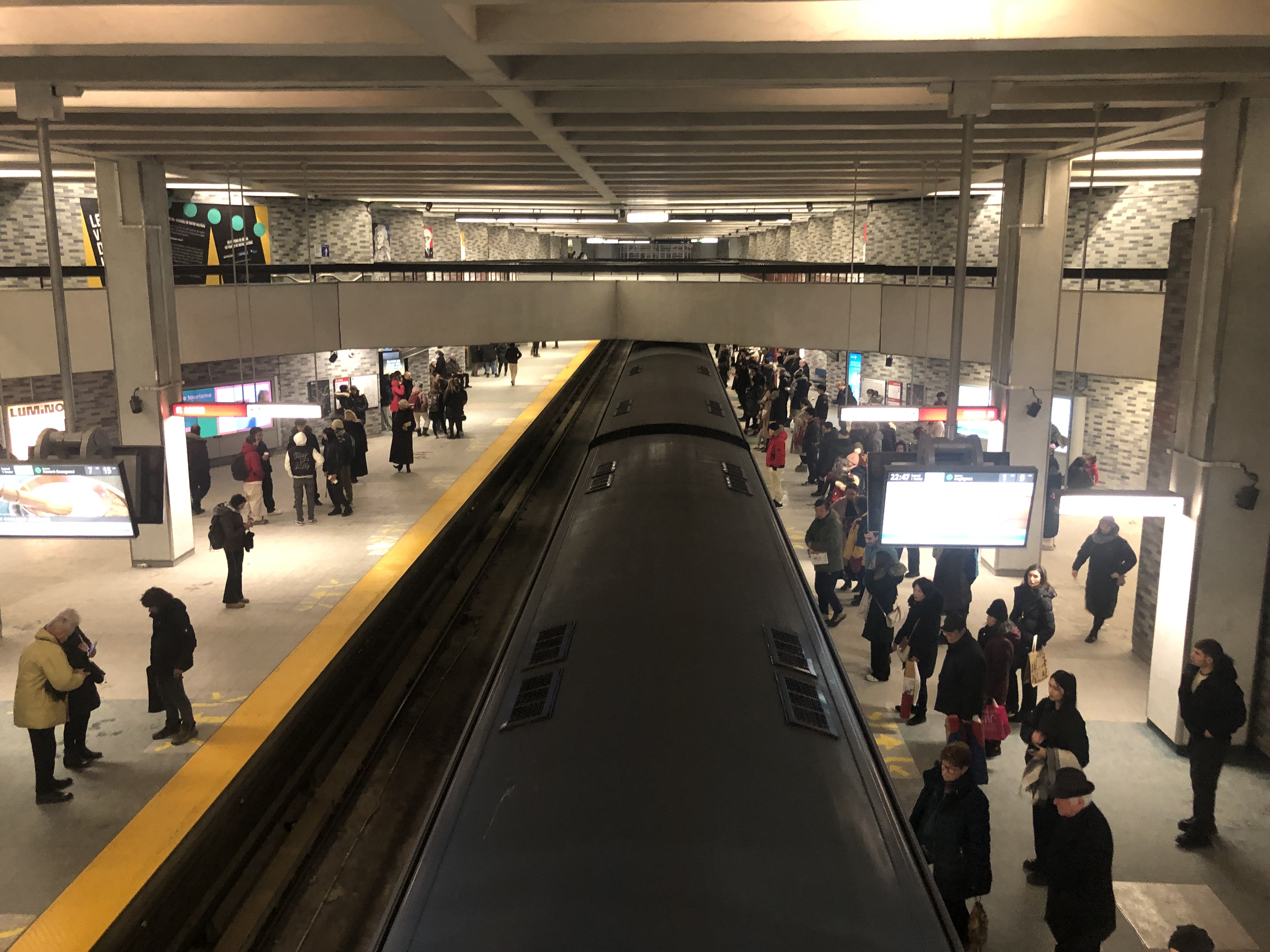

General information
- Location: 2020, rue de Bleury; Montreal, Quebec H3A 2J3; Canada
- Coordinates: 45°30′29″N 73°34′07″W
- Operator: Société de transport de Montréal
- Platforms: 2 side platforms
- Tracks: 2
- Connections: STM bus

Construction
- Depth: 11.6 metres (38 feet 1 inch), 47th deepest
- Accessible: Yes
- Architect: David, Boulva, et Clève

Other information
- Fare zone: ARTM: A

History
- Opened: 14 October 1966
- Rebuilt: 2007-2010 (de Bleury south exit) 2019-2022 (de Bleury north exit)

Passengers
- 2024: 6,122,923 ▲11.38%
- Rank: 8 of 68

Services
Preceding station	Montreal Metro	Following station
McGill toward Angrignon	Green Line	Saint-Laurent toward Honoré-Beaugrand
Location

Place-des-Arts station (French pronunciation: [plas dez‿aʁ]) is a Montreal Metro station in the borough of Ville-Marie, Montreal, Quebec, Canada. It is operated by the Société de transport de Montréal (STM) and serves the Green Line. The station opened on October 14, 1966, as part of the original network of the Metro. It is located in the Quartier des spectacles district, in east-central downtown.

== Overview ==
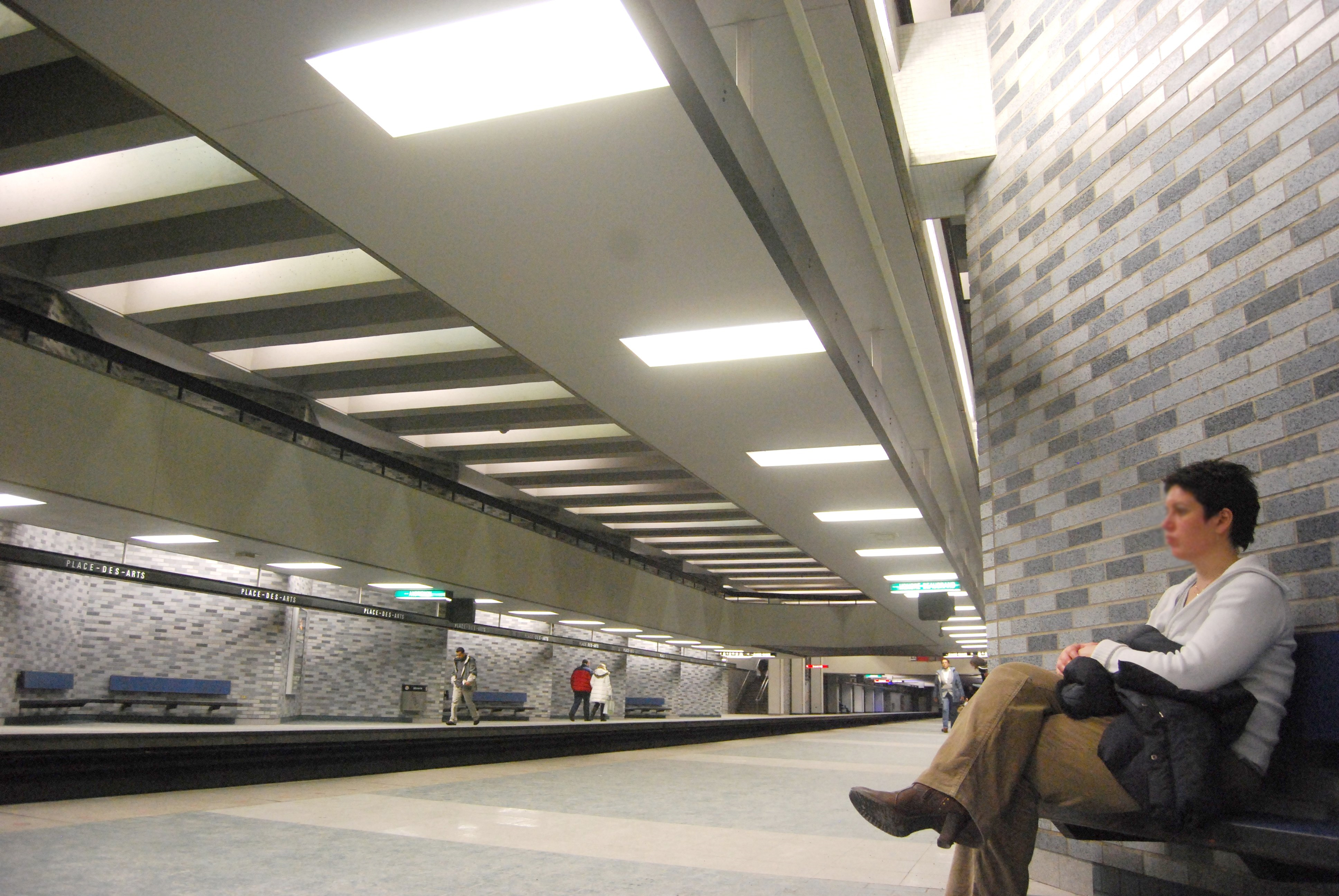
Place-des-Arts station platform.

Designed by David, Boulva, et Cleve, it is a normal side platform station built in open cut under boul. De Maisonneuve, with two ticket halls joined by corridors that surround and overlook the platforms. The eastern mezzanine includes staircases with one-way exit-only turnstiles. The station is joined by underground city to Place des Arts and Université du Québec à Montréal, and has additional four street-level exits.

The station's walls are coved in light-grey bricks in a zig-zag layout.

The station is equipped with the MétroVision information screens which displays news, commercials, and the time until the next train arrives.

The station has 4 entrances:

- 1555, rue Jeanne-Mance
- 2020, rue de Bleury
- 1990, rue de Bleury
- 150, rue Ontario

== Architecture and art ==
The station features art by Frédéric Back: a massive stained glass mural entitled L'histoire de la musique à Montréal ("history of music in Montreal"). The work is composed of thousands of layered pieces of glass backlit by 105 lighting tubes and supported by a tonne of steel. The glass surface is rippled, causing the brilliant colours to shimmer ethereally. The work was originally intended to be an homage to four important Quebec musical artists: the composers Calixa Lavallée, Guillaume Couture, Alexis Contant, and soprano Dame Emma Albani. Unveiled on December 20, 1967, this stained glass was the first work of art to be commissioned for the Metro system. In 2008 the lighting system was completely renovated by the lighting artist Axel Morgenthaler.

The second work of art is a hand-glazed ceramic mosaic by the artist Saskia Siebrand, installed in 2005. It contains tiles of over 300 colours, all custom hand-glazed.

This architectural composition made of perforated aluminum panels was added to conceal a telecommunications room that had been added over the station's western tunnel opening. Before this work was added, the Montréal métro featured only one mosaic, the one by Gabriel Bastien and Andrea Vau at Sherbrooke station.

== Accessibility ==
In March 2019, a real estate developer announced a new condo project on top of the De Bleury north entrance, and the entrance building was closed to the public. In the meantime, the STM also worked on improving the station's accessibility by installing three elevators from the street level to the platforms. The entrance building reopened on June 16, 2022 and the station became accessible on July 21, 2022.

== Origin of the name ==
This station is named for the Place des Arts cultural complex. Opened in 1963, this complex includes five concert halls, including the largest multipurpose concert hall in Canada, and an art museum.

== Connecting bus routes ==
Société de transport de Montréal
No.	Route	Connects to	Service times / notes
80	Du Parc	Parc	Daily
125	Ontario	McGill; Frontenac; Viau	Daily
129	Côte-Sainte-Catherine	Côte-Sainte-Catherine; Champ-de-Mars	Daily
363 ☾	Saint-Laurent	Henri-Bourassa; De Castelnau; Saint-Laurent (northbound); Place-d'Armes	Night service Southbound only
365 ☾	Du Parc	Place-d'Armes; Parc; Acadie; Ahuntsic	Night service
480	Express Du Parc	Parc; Bonaventure; Gare Centrale; Terminus Centre-ville; Lucien-L'Allier	Weekdays, peak only

== Nearby points of interest ==
=== Connected via the underground city ===
- UQAM (pavillons Président-Kennedy, Chimie, Biochimie, and Arts IV)
- Place des Arts
- Musée d'art contemporain de Montréal
- Complexe Desjardins
- Hydro-Québec Building
- Place-d'Armes Metro station and points south

=== Other ===
- Quartier des Spectacles
- Église du Gesù
- Church of St. John the Evangelist
- Cinéma Imperial

== Film and television appearances ==
Scenes of the 2017 Keanu Reeves film John Wick: Chapter 2 were filmed at the station. The station was redressed to stand in for a New York City Subway station.
