= Champ de Mars (Montreal) =

Public park in Montreal, Quebec, Canada

Coordinates: 45°30′32″N 73°33′19″W

Montreal's fortifications
- in Champ de Mars, Montreal Quebec, Canada

Site information
- Type: Montreal's fortifications, formerly a parade grounds and city walls

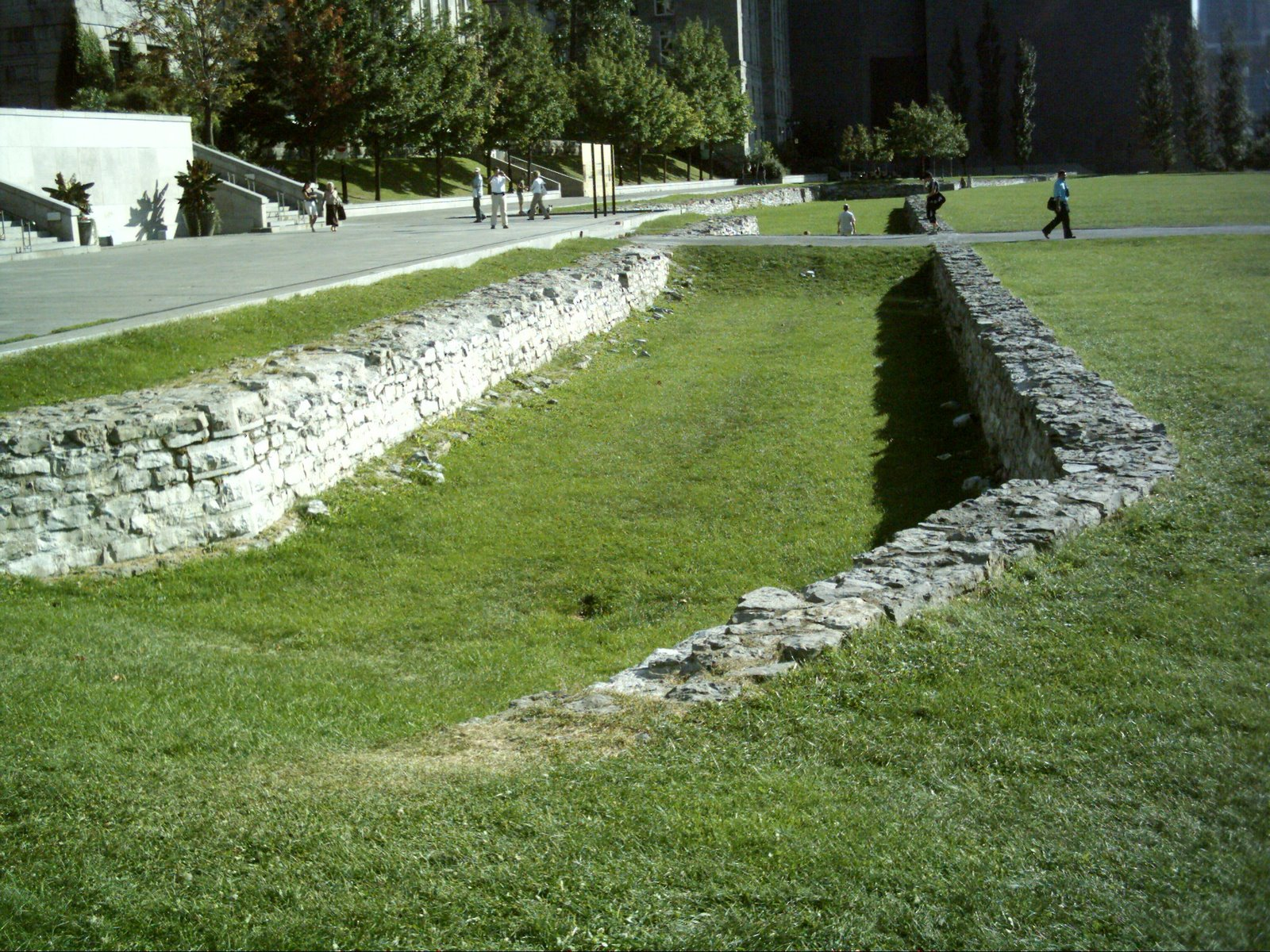
Champ de Mars, location of original walls

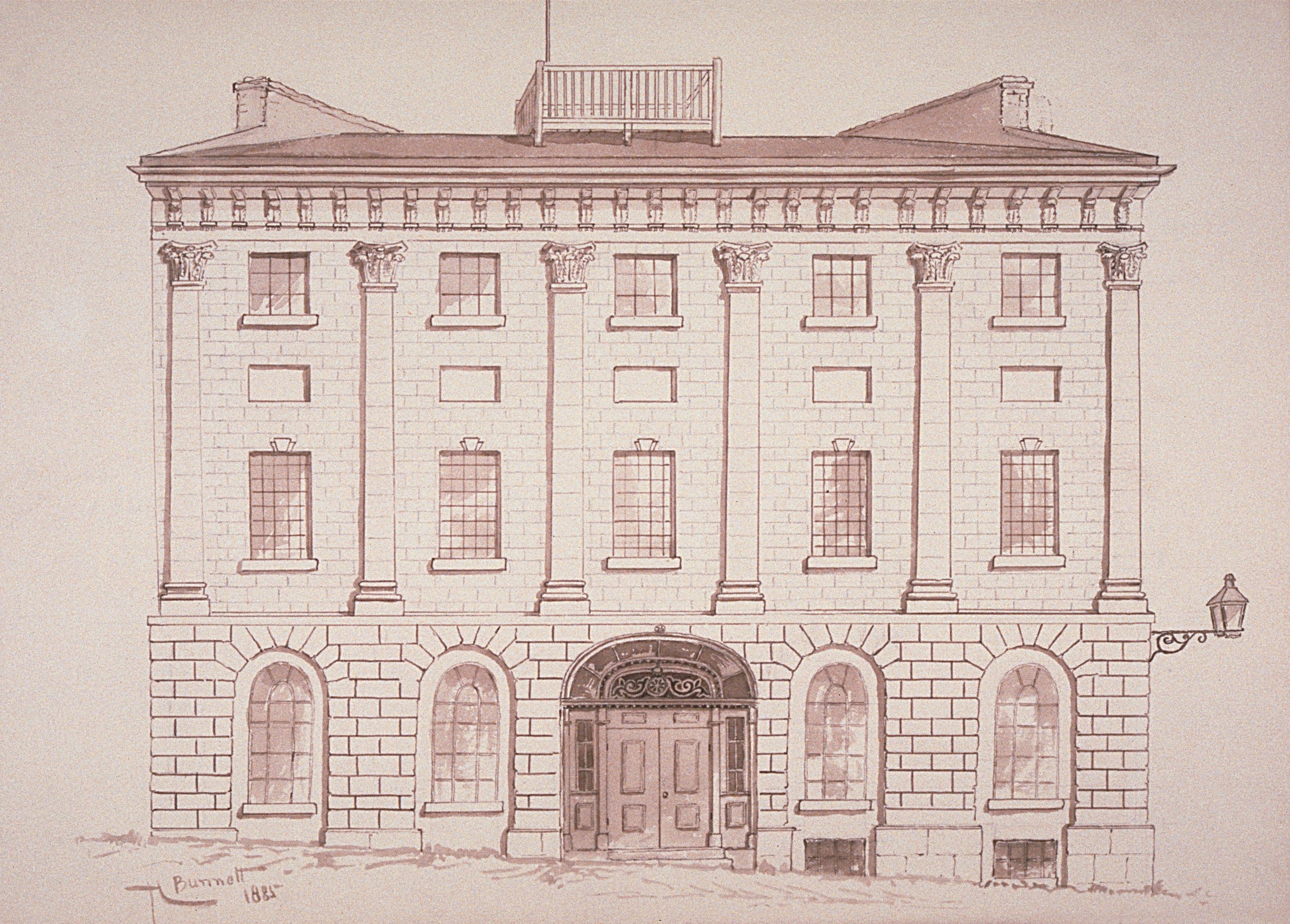
David Ross' house overlooking the Champ de Mars, built circa 1800

The Champ de Mars (Note: French pronunciation: [ʃɑ̃ də maʁs], lit. 'Field of Mars') is a public park in Old Montreal quarter of Montreal, Quebec, Canada.

Formerly a military parade ground, the park had previously been traversed by Montreal's fortifications, which were demolished at the beginning of the 19th century. The adjacent Montreal City Hall (1878) and the old courthouse (1856) were later built inside the line of the fortifications. Champ de Mars served as a municipal parking lot starting in the 1960s until being restored as a park in 1992. At that time, the foundations of Montreal's city walls were discovered and restored.

The site's name commemorates its former military purpose; Mars was the Roman god of war and campus Martius was a Latin term for a military exercise ground. The walls now standing on site are the foundations of the original walls used to protect the city.

The area is bordered by the Montreal City Hall, the old and new courthouses and the Champ-de-Mars Metro station.

== See also ==
- List of Montreal parks#Urban squares.
