= Ramparts of Montreal =

Former fortifications to protect early Montreal

The Ramparts of Montreal were the fortification walls built to protect the early settlement of Montreal, the area now called Old Montreal.

== Construction ==
Building began in 1716 by Gaspard Chaussegros de Léry bounded roughly by rue McGill in the west, rues St. Jacques/Champ des Mars/Notre-Dame in the north, rue Berri in the east, rue de la Commune/Place d'Youville in the south and completed in 1738. The wall replaced cedar post palisades built in the 17th century and required expropriation of land from property owners who were later offered an opportunity to reclaim during demolition.

== Gates ==
There were eight entrances along the walls:

- Porte des Récollets
- Porte de Saint-Laurent
- Porte de Québec
- Porte de la Canoterie
- Porte du Gouvernement
- Porte de l'Hôtel-Dieu
- Porte du Marché
- Porte de la Petite rivière

Visual documents of the wall are limited but given it was designed by de Léry who built a wall in Quebec it can be assumed it would look very similar.

== Decline and demolition ==
Despite its height of 6 metres, the wall failed to repel the British and was only effective against attacks from the First Nations. The city fell in to the British in 1760 and to the Americans in 1775. In 1801, the British administration passed an Act (The Act to Demolish the Old Walls and Fortifications Surrounding the City of Montréal), to begin the process of demolishing the fortifications and to provide landowners with the ability to reclaim lost land. From 1804 to 1817, the walls were torn down and the city was allowed to expand and grow.

Remains of the wall foundation have resurfaced and have been documented:

- Parc du Champ-de-Mars
- at Pointe-à-Callière, Montréal Museum of Archaeology and History
- Les Remparts Restaurant on rue de la Commune

Fortification Lane is also reminder of the existence of the walls.

The city has tried to include outlines to highlight where the walls once stood.
