= Alexander Cowper Hutchison =

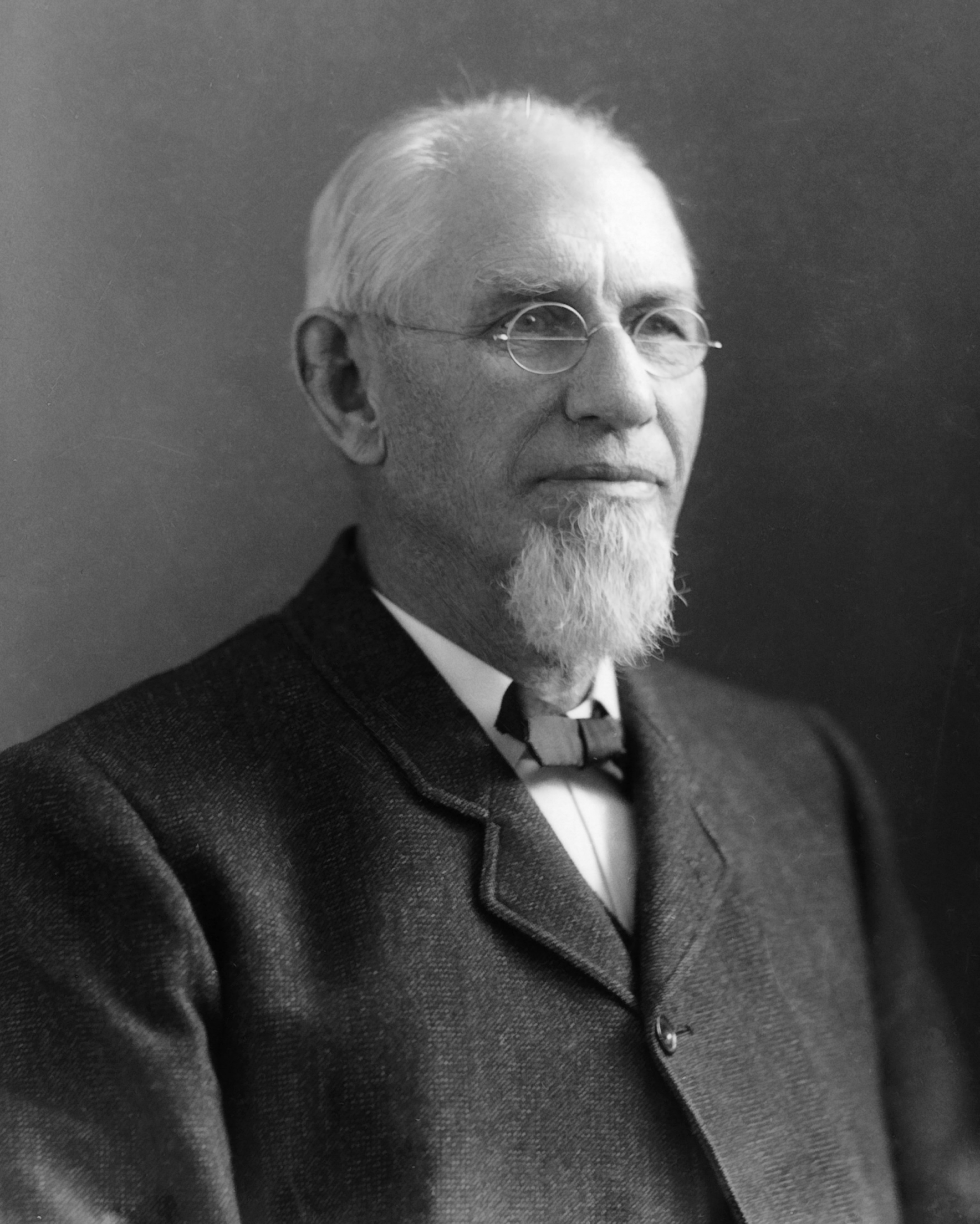

Mayor of Westmount
- In office 1884–1887
- Preceded by: James Kewley Ward
- Succeeded by: Thomas Patton

Personal details
- Born: 2 April 1838 Montreal, Lower Canada
- Died: 1 January 1922 (aged 83) Montreal, Canada
- Occupation: Architect

Alexander Cowper Hutchison (2 April 1838 – 1 January 1922) was a Canadian architect from Montreal who served as Mayor of Westmount from 1884 to 1887. His architectural achievements in Montreal include the Montreal City Hall, the Redpath Museum, and the Erskine and American Church. Hutchison was also responsible for designing the large ice palaces built entirely of frozen ice blocks at the Montreal Winter Carnivals of the 1880s.
