= Belgo Building =

Coordinates: 45.5059°N 73.5673°W

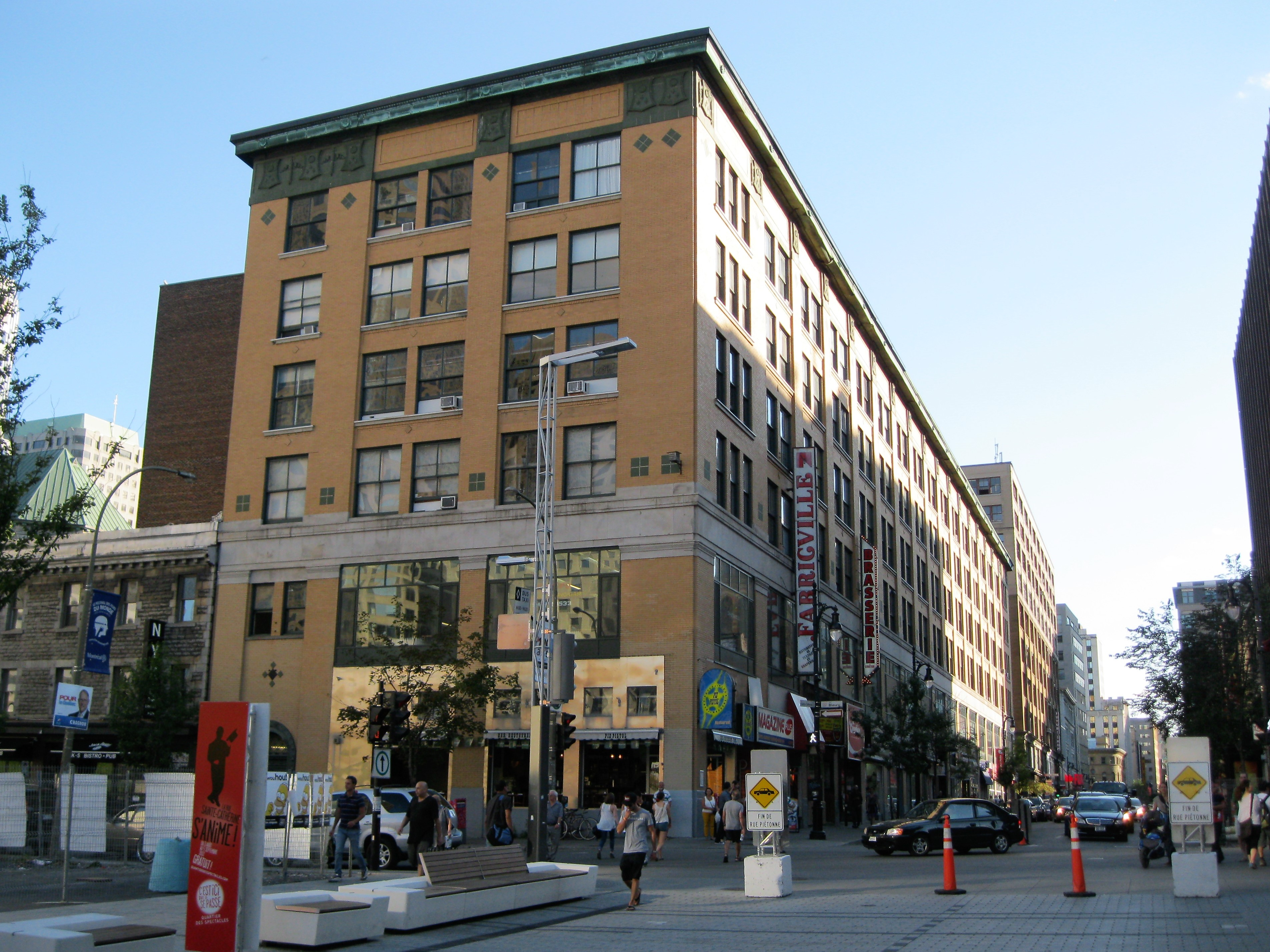
The Belgo Building in 2012.

The Belgo Building (French: Édifice Belgo) is a six-storey building in the Quartier des spectacles district of Montreal, Quebec, Canada. It currently houses 28 art galleries, art centres and artist workshops (from 27 art galleries in 2014) as well as dance studios. It is located at 372 Saint Catherine Street West.

== History ==
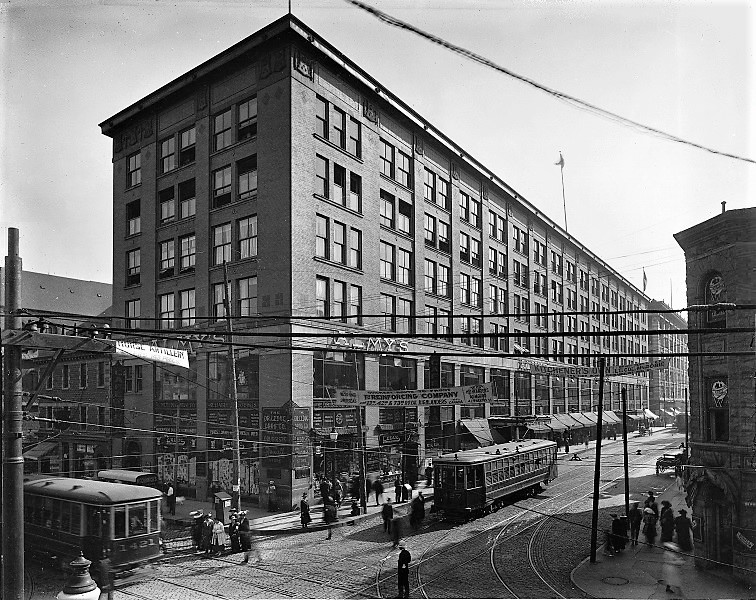
The Belgo Building in 1912.

The Belgo Building was designed in 1912 by architects Finley & Spence and completed in 1913. The exterior materials are a combination of yellow brick, Indiana limestone and Montreal greystone. The building was altered in 1958 by architect F. David Mathias, who renovated the main entrance in polished green granite.

The building originally housed a luxury department store known as Scroggie's. It was later sold to an American company and renamed Almy's, after which the upper floors were leased to companies in the garment industry. Almy's closed in 1922, after which the entire building was used by the garment industry.

In the 1980s artists began renting out space in the building, while garment business were moving out, as the garment district shifted north to Mile End and later Ahuntsic.

Today, the building is home to the largest concentration of contemporary art galleries in Canada.

=== 2026 acquisition ===
After approximately 55 years of ownership by the Dubrovsky family, the Belgo Building was sold in 2026 to Montreal real-estate company Avenir Immobilier.

The transaction received coverage in Montreal media, in part because of concerns within the arts community about whether a change of ownership could affect the building's longstanding artistic vocation.

Following the acquisition, Avenir Immobilier announced that it intended to maintain the Belgo's role as an arts centre while undertaking renovations and improvements to the century-old property. Plans included work on vacant spaces, common areas, windows and building systems, as well as a heritage study intended to guide future work.

Representatives of Avenir Immobilier stated that renovations would seek to preserve the building's architectural character rather than transform it into a conventional modern commercial property. The company also expressed an intention to attract additional galleries and arts organizations to vacant spaces in the building.
