= Montreal City Hall =

City hall of Montreal

- Hôtel de Ville de Montréal (French)
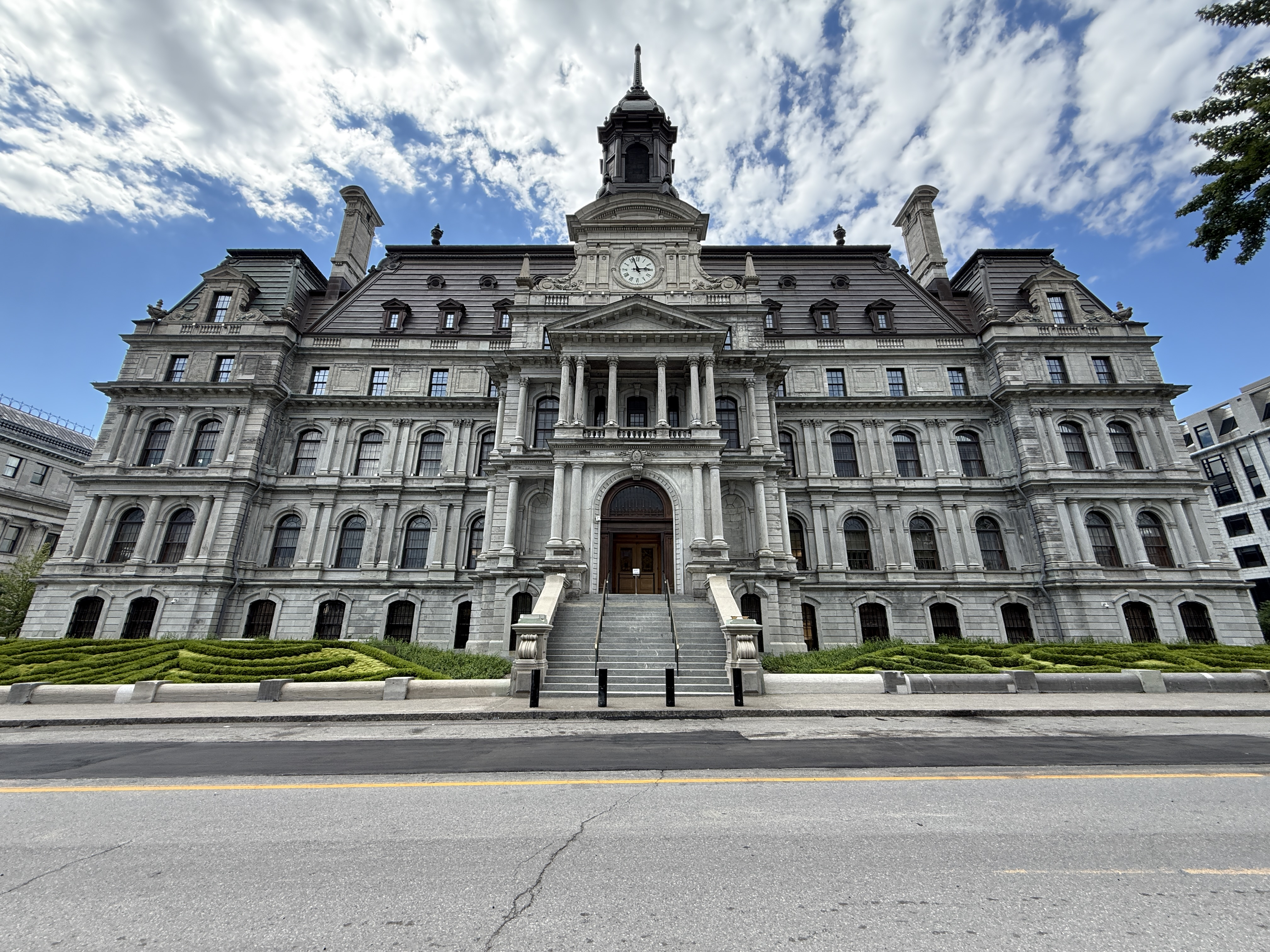
- Montreal City Hall, 2026

- Location within Montreal
- Interactive map of the Montreal City Hall area

General information
- Status: Completed
- Type: City hall
- Architectural style: Second Empire, Beaux-Arts
- Location: 275, rue Notre-Dame Est; Montreal, Quebec; H2Y 1C6
- Coordinates: 45.5086°N 73.5539°W
- Current tenants: Mayor of Montreal, Montreal City Council
- Groundbreaking: 1872
- Construction started: 1872
- Completed: 1878
- Opened: 1878
- Inaugurated: 1878
- Renovated: 1923–1926, 2019–2024
- Destroyed: March 3, 1922 (interior gutted by fire)
- Cost: $481,000 (1878)
- Client: City Council of Montreal
- Owner: City of Montreal

Height
- Roof: Mansard roof

Technical details
- Structural system: Masonry exterior load-bearing walls; reinforced steel and concrete interior superstructure (1923 rebuild)
- Floor count: 5

Design and construction
- Architects: Henri-Maurice Perrault; Alexander Cowper Hutchison
- Architecture firm: Perrault & Hutchison
- Designations: National Historic Site of Canada (1984); Immeuble patrimonial classé (1974)

Renovating team
- Architect: Louis Parant (1923–1926)

Website
- montreal.ca/hotel-de-ville-de-montreal

National Historic Site of Canada
- Official name: Montreal City Hall / Hôtel de ville de Montréal
- Designated: November 23, 1984
- Reference no.: 4160

The five-story Montreal City Hall (French: Hôtel de Ville de Montréal, pronounced [otɛl də vil də mɔ̃ʁeal]) is the seat of local government in Montreal, Quebec, Canada. It was designed by architects Henri-Maurice Perrault and Alexander Cowper Hutchison, and built between 1872 and '78 in the Second Empire style. It is located in Old Montreal, between Place Jacques-Cartier and the Champ de Mars, at 275 Notre-Dame Street East. The closest Metro station is Champ-de-Mars, on the Orange Line.

As one of the best examples of the Second Empire style in Canada, and the first city hall to have been constructed in the country solely for municipal administration, it was designated a National Historic Site of Canada in 1984.

== History and architecture ==
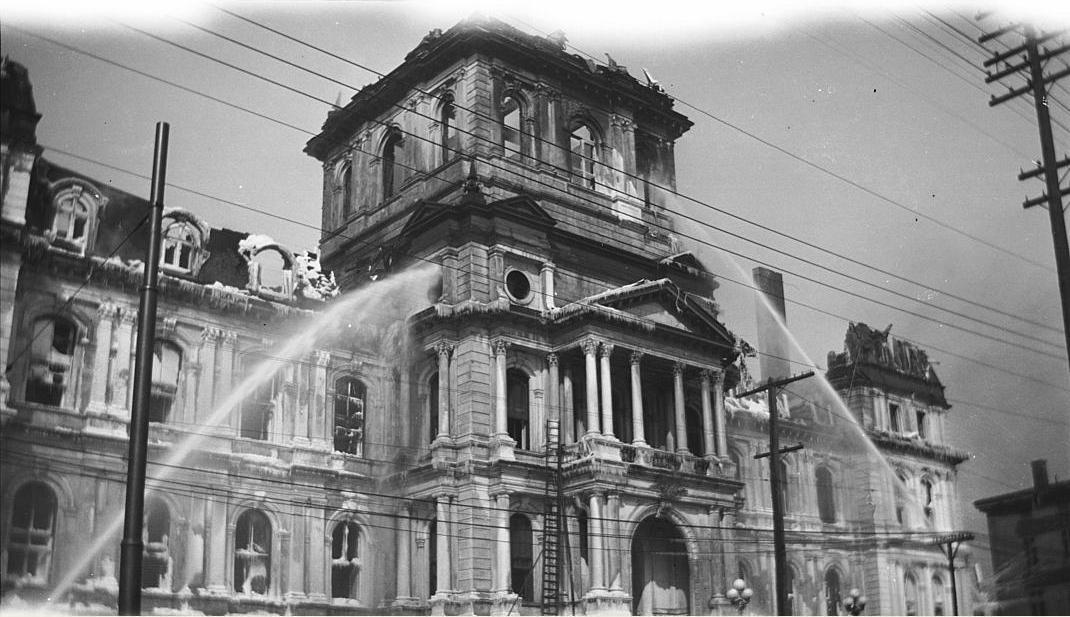
City Hall on the evening of March 3, 1922

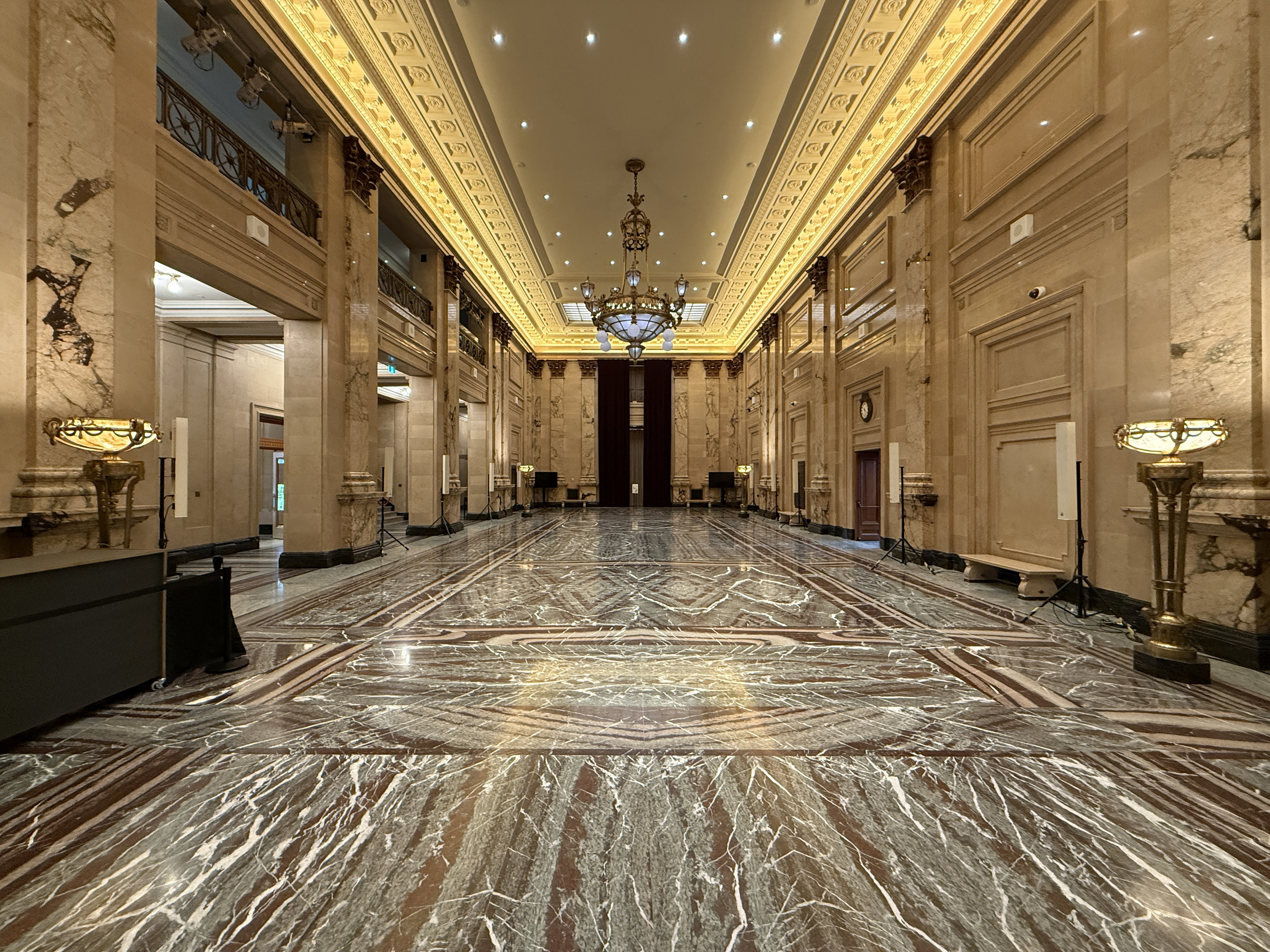
Grand Hall

Construction on the building began in 1872 and was completed in 1878. The original building was gutted by fire in March 1922, leaving only the outer wall and destroying many of the city's historic records. The architect Louis Parant was commissioned for the reconstruction, who decided to build an entirely new building with a self-supporting steel structure built inside the shell of the ruins. This new building was modelled after the city hall of the French city of Tours. Other changes included a remodelling of the Mansard roof into a new Beaux-Arts inspired model, with a copper roof instead of the original slate tiles. The new building opened on February 15, 1926.

In 1967, Charles de Gaulle, the president of France, gave his Vive le Québec libre speech from the building's balcony.

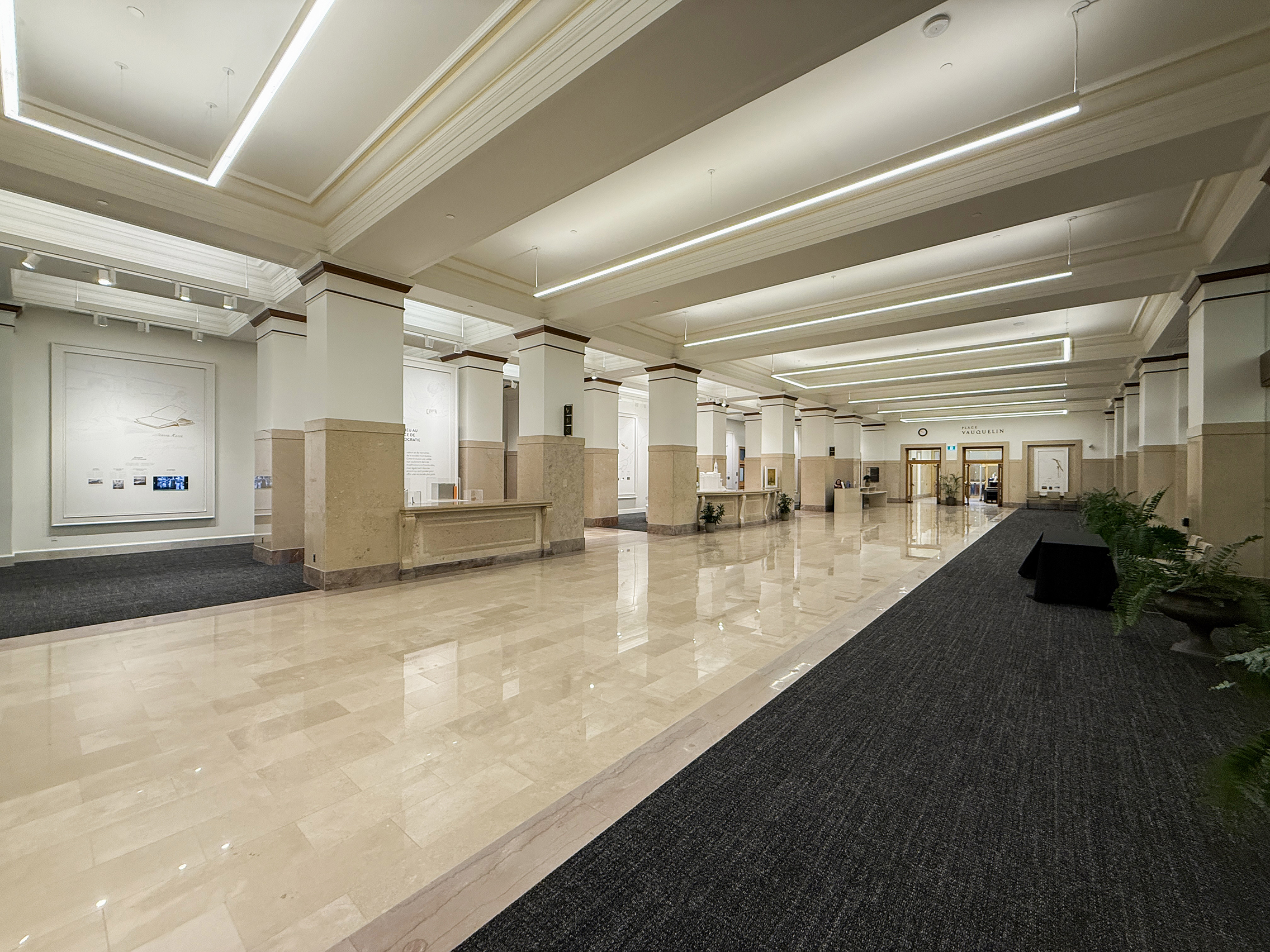
Ground level lobby have a small exhibition space

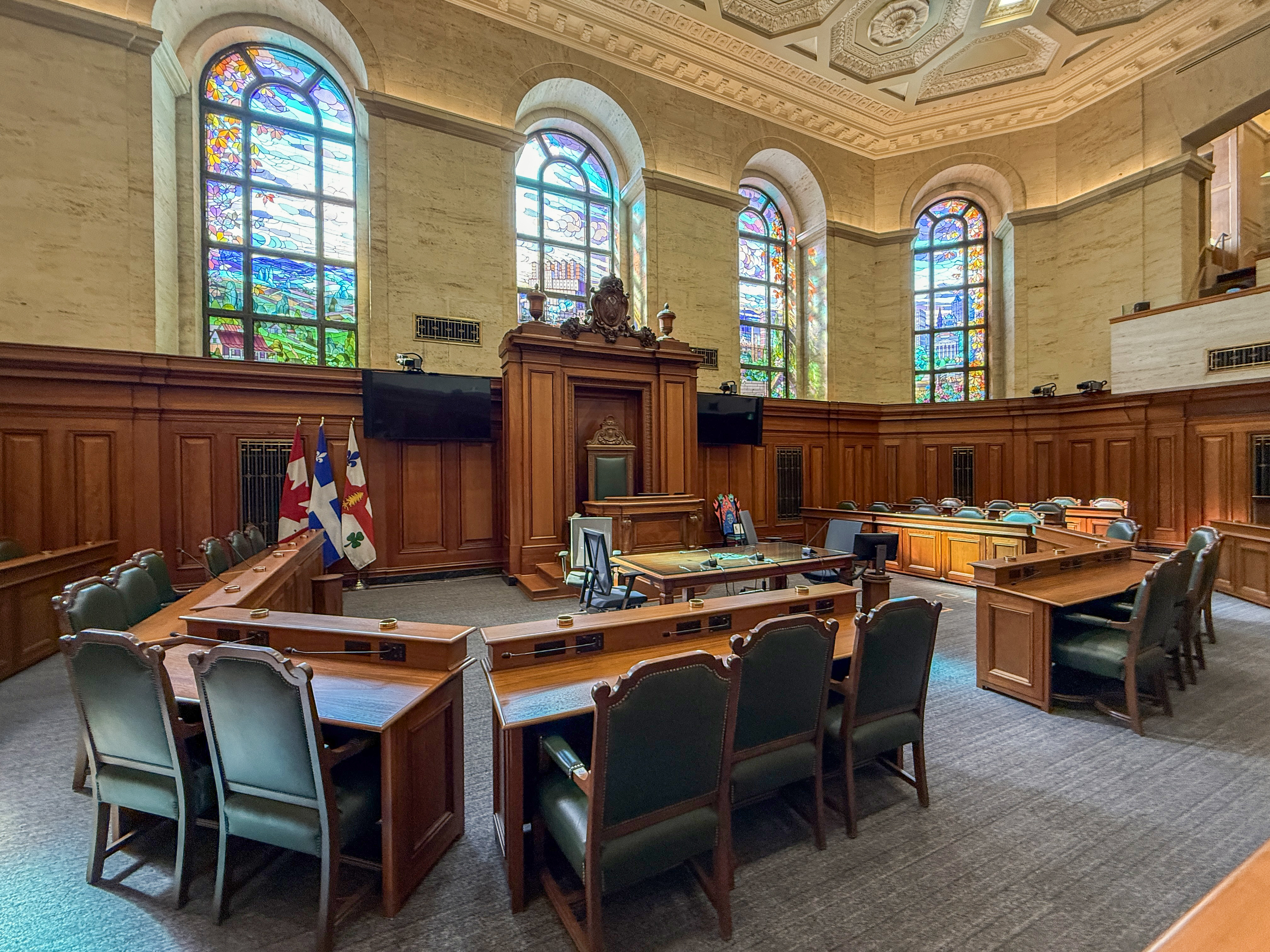
City Hall Council

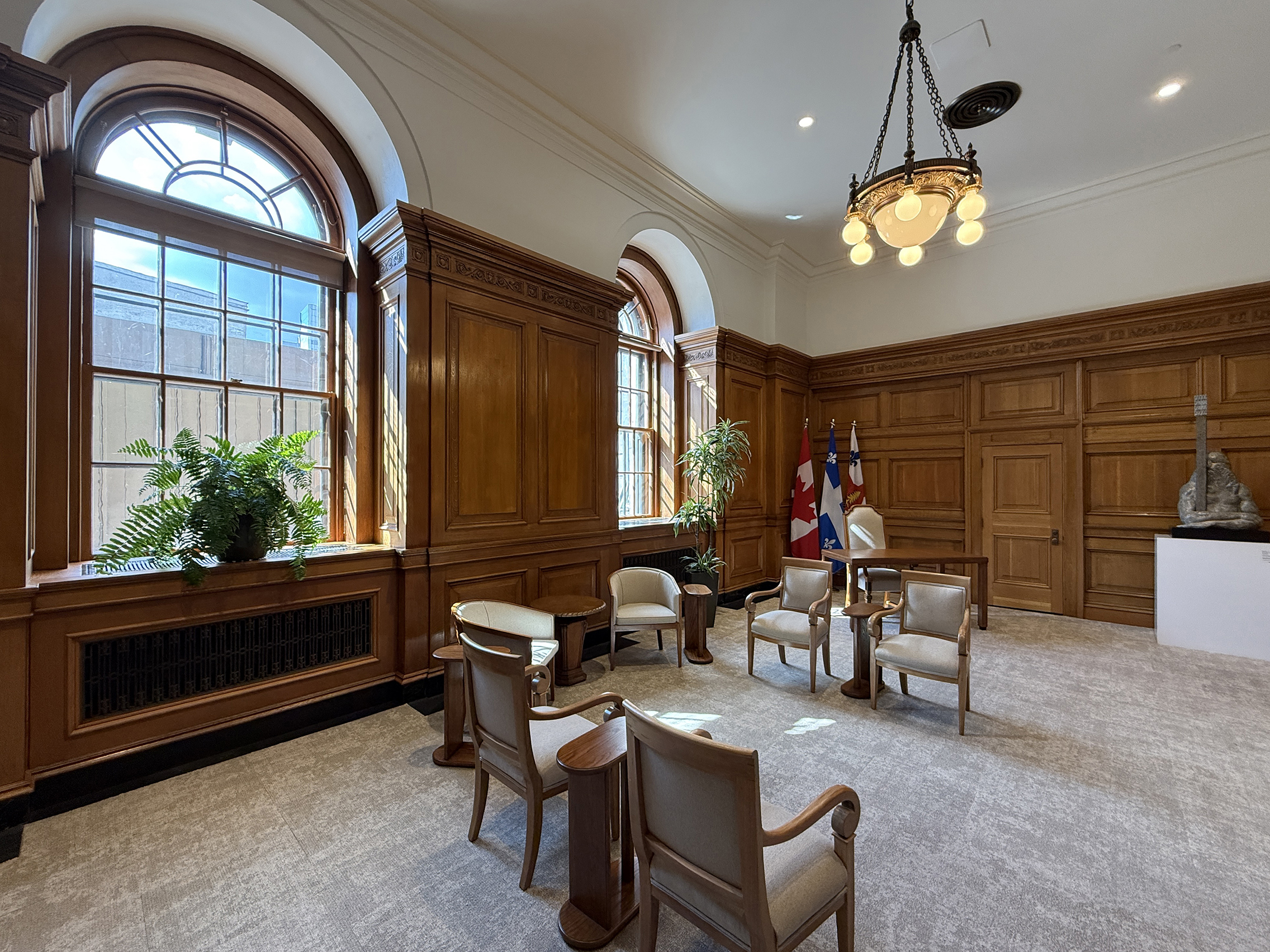
Salle du Pin-Blanc

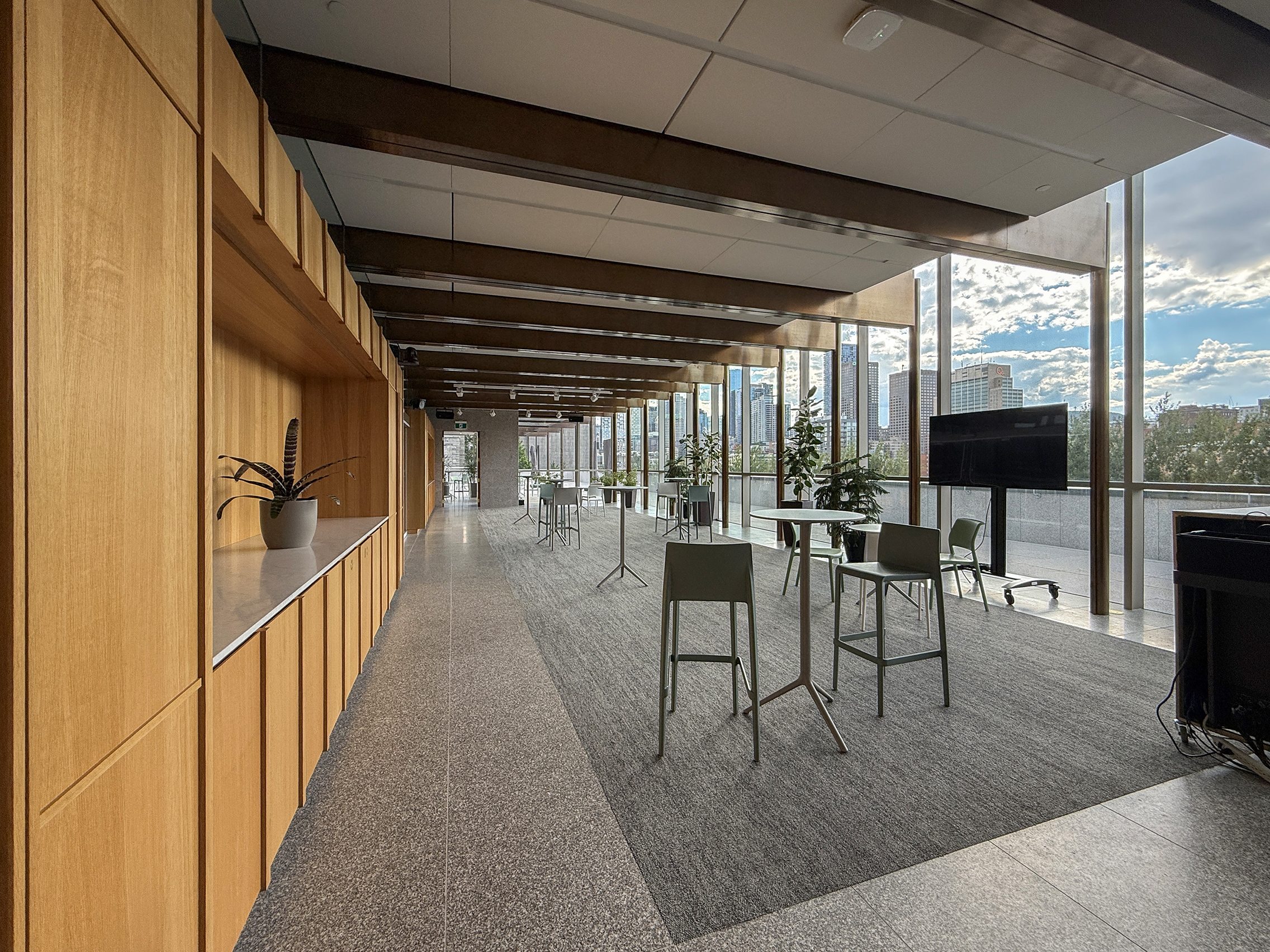
Function room in expansion area

== See also ==
- Bonsecours Market – home to Montreal City Hall and Montreal City Council from 1852 to 1878
