= Champ-de-Mars station (Montreal Metro) =

Montreal Metro station

Champ-de-Mars
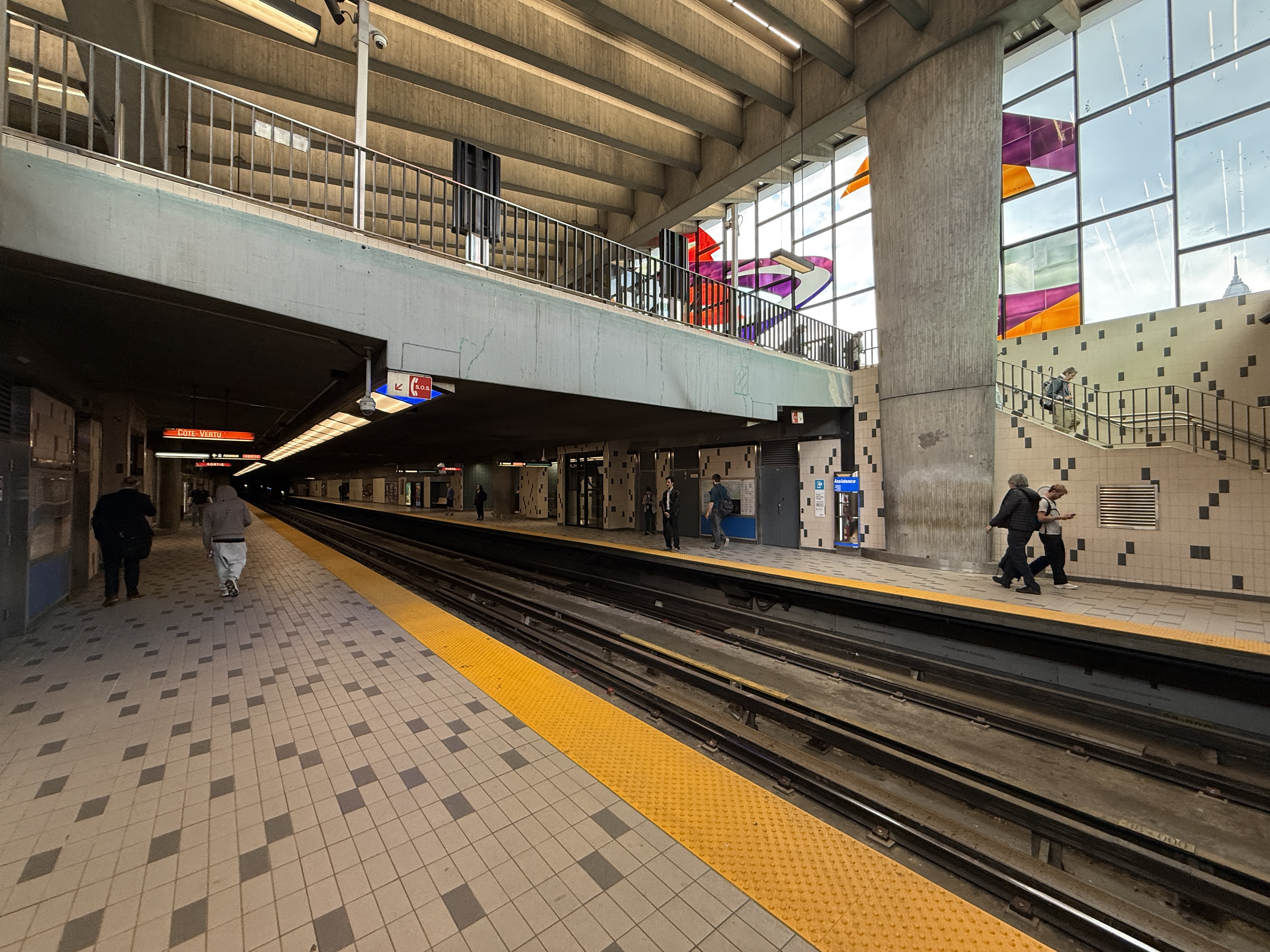

General information
- Location: 940, rue Sanguinet; Montreal, Quebec H2X 3E2; Canada
- Coordinates: 45°30′36″N 73°33′23″W
- Operator: Société de transport de Montréal
- Platforms: 2 side platforms
- Tracks: 2
- Connections: STM bus

Construction
- Depth: 6.1 metres (20 feet), 59th deepest
- Accessible: Yes
- Architect: Adalbert Niklewicz

Other information
- Fare zone: ARTM: A

History
- Opened: 14 October 1966

Passengers
- 2024: 3,729,083 ▲28.62%
- Rank: 26 of 68

Services
Preceding station	Montreal Metro	Following station
Place-d'Armes toward Côte-Vertu	Orange Line	Berri–UQAM toward Montmorency
Location

Champ-de-Mars station is a Montreal Metro station in the borough of Ville-Marie in Montreal, Quebec, Canada. It is operated by the Société de transport de Montréal (STM) and serves the Orange Line. It is located in Old Montreal by the Champ de Mars park. It opened on October 14, 1966, as part of the original Metro network.

== Overview ==
Designed by Adalbert Niklewicz, it is a normal side platform station, built in open cut due to the presence of weak Utica shale in the surrounding rock. Its entrance is located near a series of tunnels that cross the Autoroute Ville-Marie, giving access to Old Montreal.

== Station improvements ==
In December 2014, the station became fully accessible with the installation of three elevators. The $12m project also involved the renovation of the main entrance building (including installation of a new green roof) and underground city access to Centre hospitalier de l'Université de Montréal (CHUM).

== Architecture and art ==
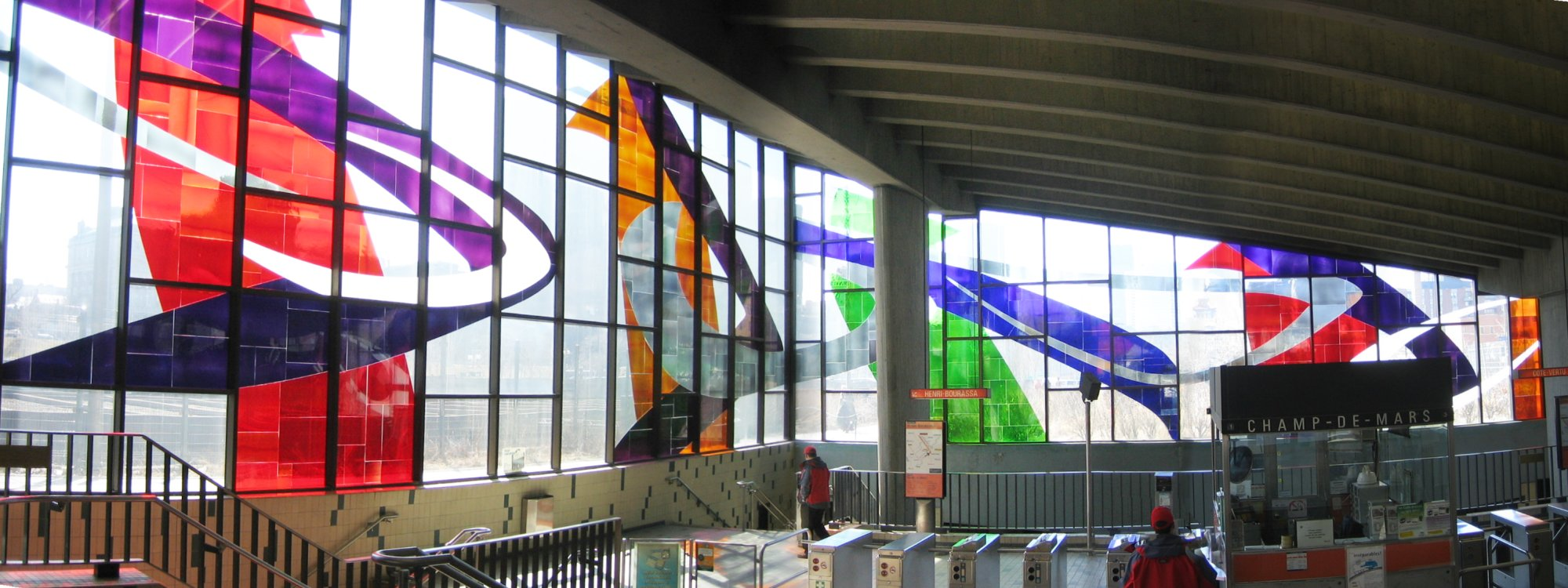
The stained glass, installed in 1968

One of the most important artworks in the Metro, a set of stained glass windows by noted Quebec artist Marcelle Ferron, illuminates the mezzanine of this station. These windows, one of the artist's masterpieces and her most famous work, were given by the Government of Quebec in 1968. They were the first work of non-figurative art to be commissioned for the Metro, representing the first official entrance of Automatist art in the system.

== Origin of the name ==
This station is named for Champ-de-Mars, a public park facing Montreal City Hall. The name is the French term for a military parade ground. It was formerly crossed by the city's fortifications, demolished in the 19th century, the foundations of which can still be seen. It was later turned into a parking lot, which was replaced by a park in 1980s.

== Connecting bus routes ==
Société de transport de Montréal
No.	Route	Connects to	Service times / notes
14	Atateken	Laurier; Beaudry	Daily
129	Côte-Sainte-Catherine	Côte-Sainte-Catherine; Place-des-Arts	Daily
361 ☾	Saint-Denis	Replaces the Orange Line from Henri-Bourassa to Place-d'Armes	Night service

== Nearby points of interest ==
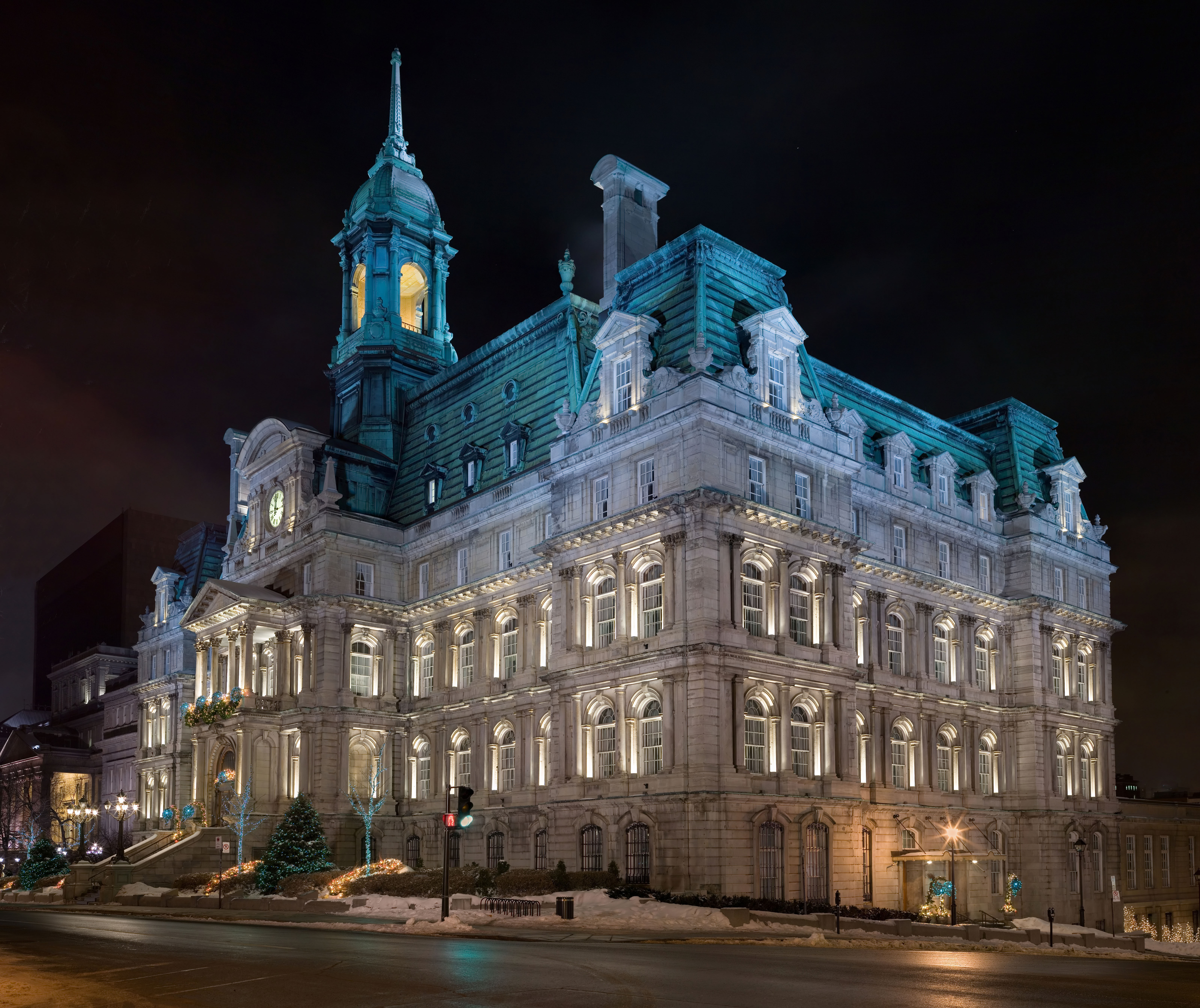
City Hall, January 2006

=== Connected via the underground city ===
- Centre hospitalier de l'Université de Montréal (CHUM)

=== Other ===
- Place des Montréalaises
- Montreal City Hall
- Old Montreal
- Old Port
- Bonsecours Market
- Chapelle Notre-Dame-de-Bon-Secours
- Place Marguerite-Bourgeoys
- Place Marie-Josèphe-Angélique
- Place Jacques-Cartier
- Château Ramezay
- Sir George-Étienne Cartier National Historic Site
- Édifice Lucien-Saulnier (former courthouse)
- Complexe Chaussegros-de-Léry (City of Montreal)
- Palais de justice (Montreal)
- Édifice Jacques-Viger
