= Place-d'Armes station =

Montreal Metro station

Place-d’Armes
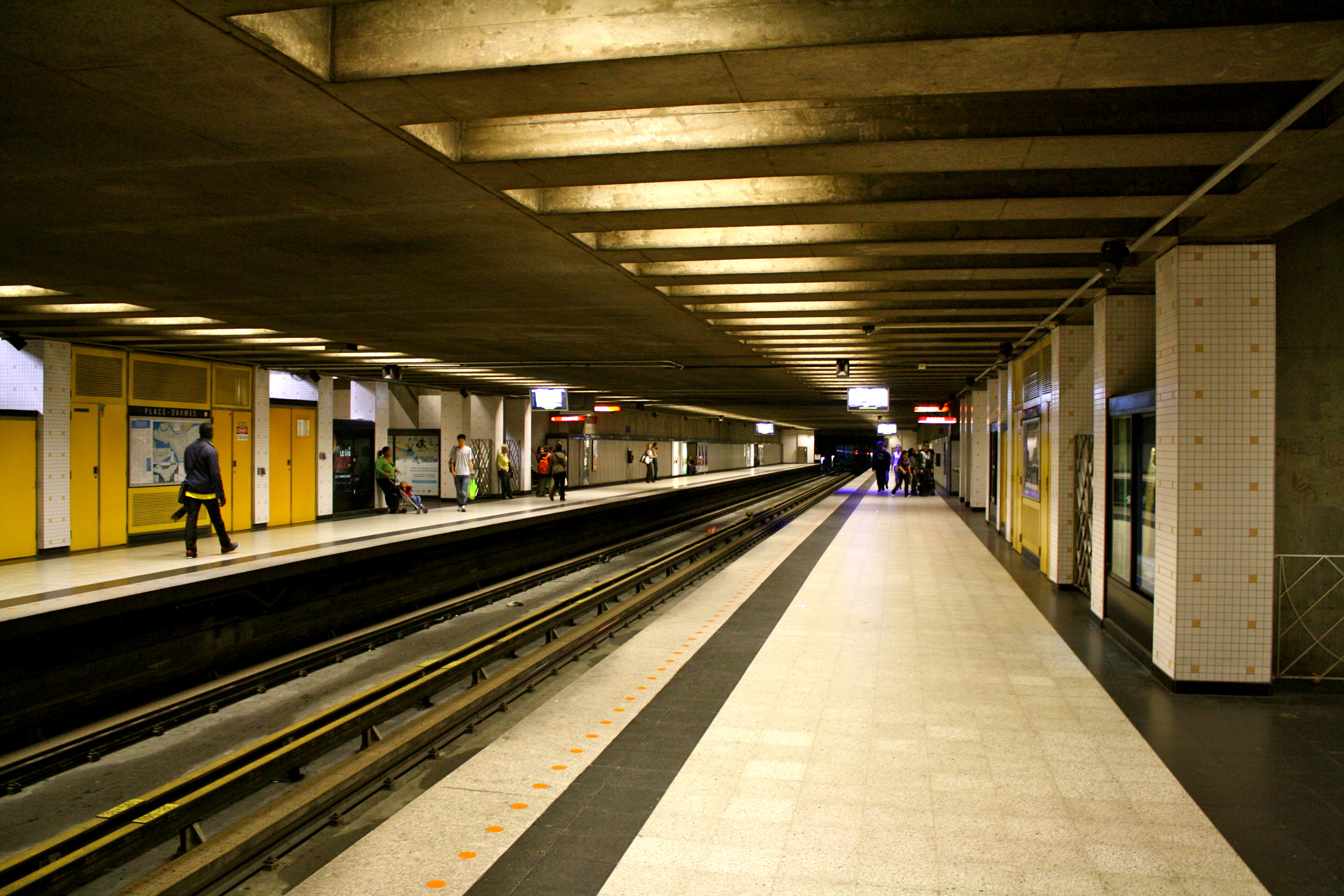

General information
- Location: 960 rue Saint-Urbain; Montreal, Quebec H2Z 1K4; Canada
- Coordinates: 45°30′23″N 73°33′35″W
- Operator: Société de transport de Montréal
- Platforms: 2 side platforms
- Tracks: 2
- Connections: STM bus

Construction
- Depth: 4.6 metres (15 feet 1 inch), 60th deepest
- Accessible: Yes
- Architect: J. Warunkiewicz

Other information
- Fare zone: ARTM: A

History
- Opened: 14 October 1966

Passengers
- 2024: 5,495,723 ▲8.99%
- Rank: 9 of 68

Services
Preceding station	Montreal Metro	Following station
Square-Victoria–OACI toward Côte-Vertu	Orange Line	Champ-de-Mars toward Montmorency
Location

Place-d'Armes station (French pronunciation: [plas daʁm]) is a Montreal Metro station in the borough of Ville-Marie in Montreal, Quebec, Canada. It is operated by the Société de transport de Montréal (STM) and serves the Orange Line. It is located in Old Montreal.

The station opened on October 14, 1966, as part of the original network of the Metro. It was briefly the terminus of the Orange Line until Square-Victoria-OACI station opened four months later, quickly followed by Bonaventure station, the planned terminus.

== Overview ==
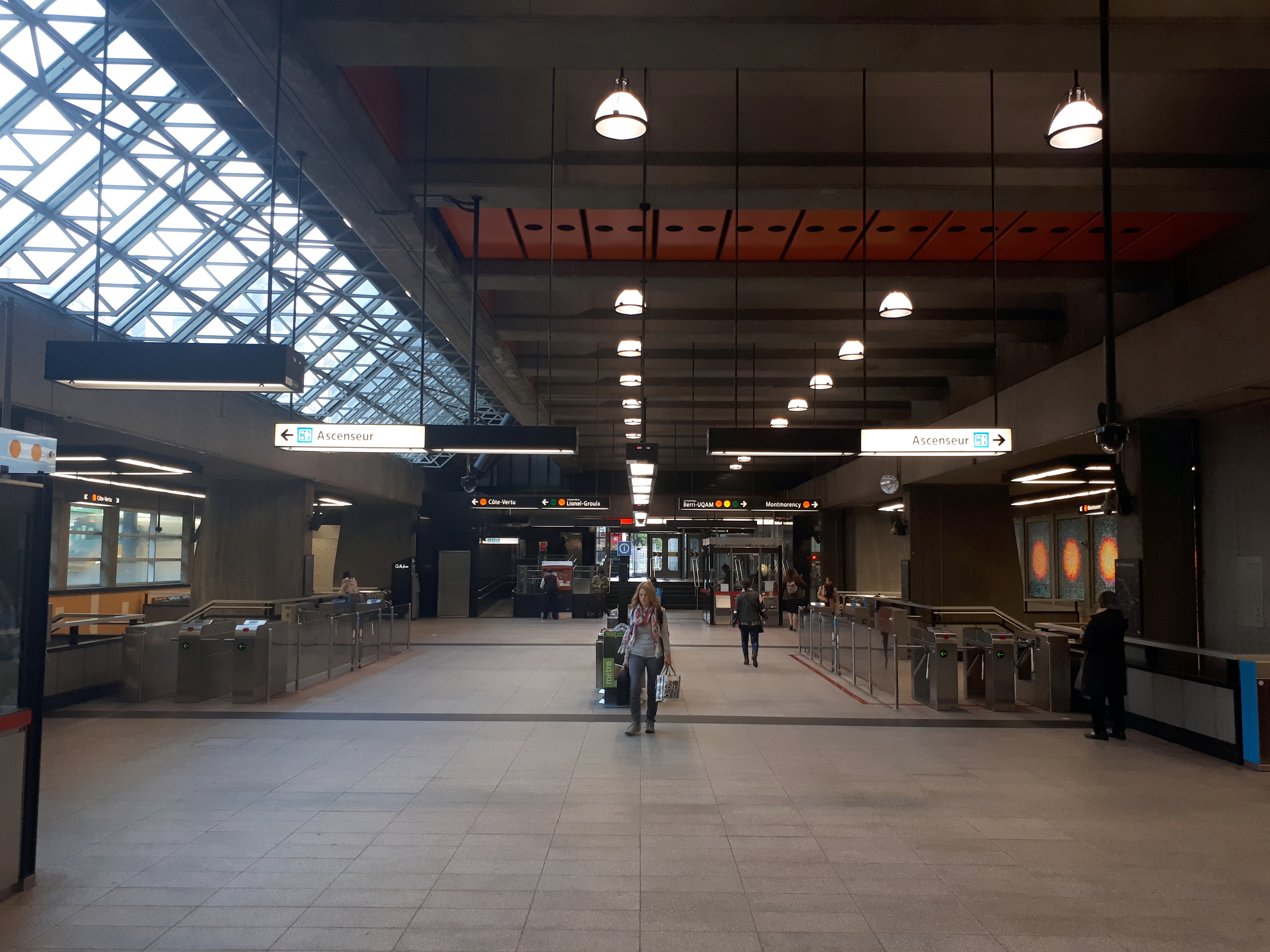
The mezzanine at Place D'Armes métro station. Fare gates on both sides of the mezzanine.

The station, designed by Janusz Warunkiewicz, is a normal side platform station, built in open cut due to the presence of weak Utica shale in the surrounding rock. Its mezzanine, with fare barriers at either side, is located directly under the Palais des congrès de Montréal; one end gives direct access to the Palais, while the other opens outside, near Chinatown.

== Station improvements ==
In March 2017, the station was made accessible with the installation of elevators. The station is equipped with the MétroVision information screens which displays news, commercials, and the time until the next train arrives.

== Origin of the name ==
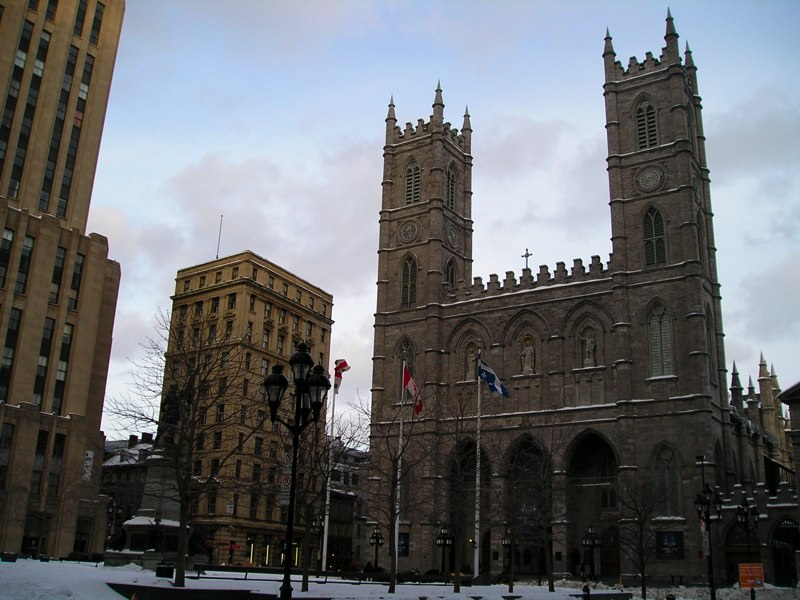
Place d'Armes and Notre-Dame Basilica in winter

This station is named for the Place d'Armes, a short distance to the south. It is the third square in Montreal to have this name, which is the common French name for the rallying place for a fort's defenders. It contains a statue of Paul Chomedey, sieur de Maisonneuve.

== Connecting bus routes ==
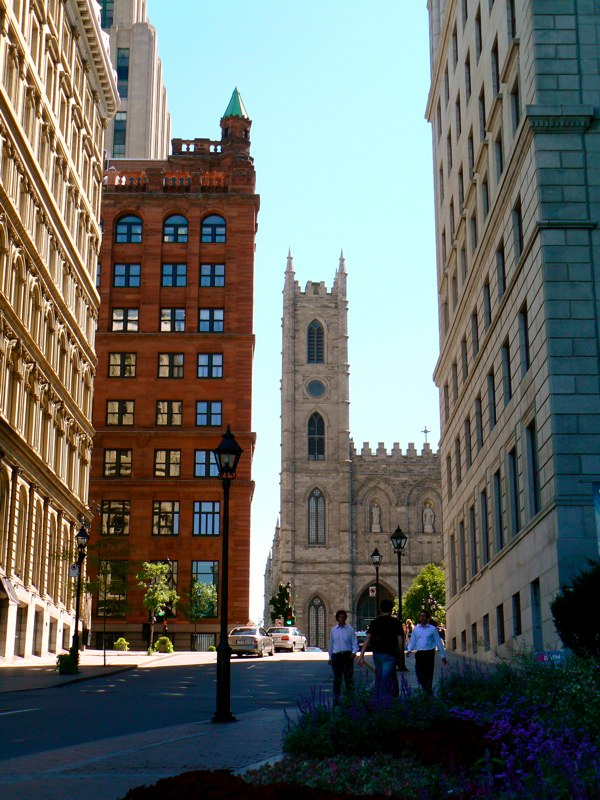
Place d'Armes in Montreal.

Société de transport de Montréal
No.	Route	Connects to	Service times / notes
55	Saint-Laurent	Saint-Laurent; De Castelnau; Henri-Bourassa	Daily
361 ☾	Saint-Denis	Replaces the Orange Line from Henri-Bourassa to Place-d'Armes	Night service
363 ☾	Saint-Laurent	Henri-Bourassa; De Castelnau; Place-des-Arts (southbound); Saint-Laurent (northbound)	Night service
365 ☾	Du Parc	Place-des-Arts; Parc; Acadie; Ahuntsic	Night service

== Station closure ==
Place d’Armes station was closed from December 1 to December 21, 2022, due to the COP15 conference; the authorities requested a complete closure of the station. The 55, 129, 361, 363 and 365 bus lines were rerouted to not stop at the station.

== Nearby points of interest ==
=== Connected via the underground city ===
- Palais des congrès de Montréal
- Complexe Guy-Favreau (Government of Canada)
- Square-Victoria–OACI Metro station and points west
- Place-des-Arts Metro station and points north

=== Other ===
- 500 Place D'Armes
- Bank of Montreal Head Office complex
- Centaur Theatre
- Chinatown
- La Presse
- Notre-Dame Basilica
- Old Brewery Mission
- Old Montreal
- Old Port
  - Montreal Science Centre
- Palais de justice de Montréal
- Musée Pointe-à-Callière
