= Quartier des spectacles =

Quartier des Spectacles
- Neighbourhood
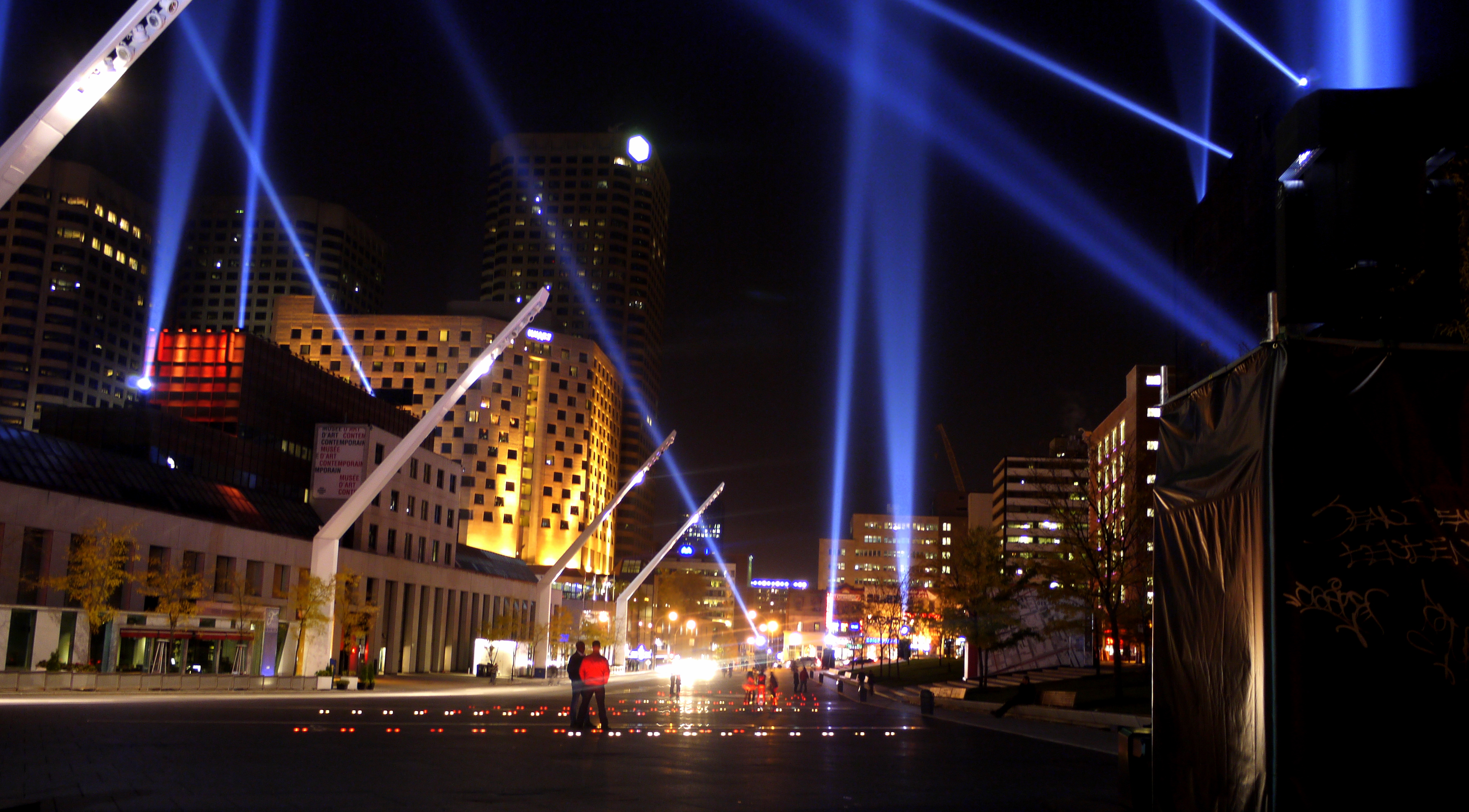
- Place des festivals, at night.

- Location of Quartier des Spectacles in Montreal
- Coordinates: 45°30′37″N 73°33′50″W
- Country: Canada
- Province: Quebec
- City: Montreal
- Borough: Ville-Marie
- Postal Code: H2L, H2X, H2Z, H3A, H3B, H5B
- Area codes: 514, 438

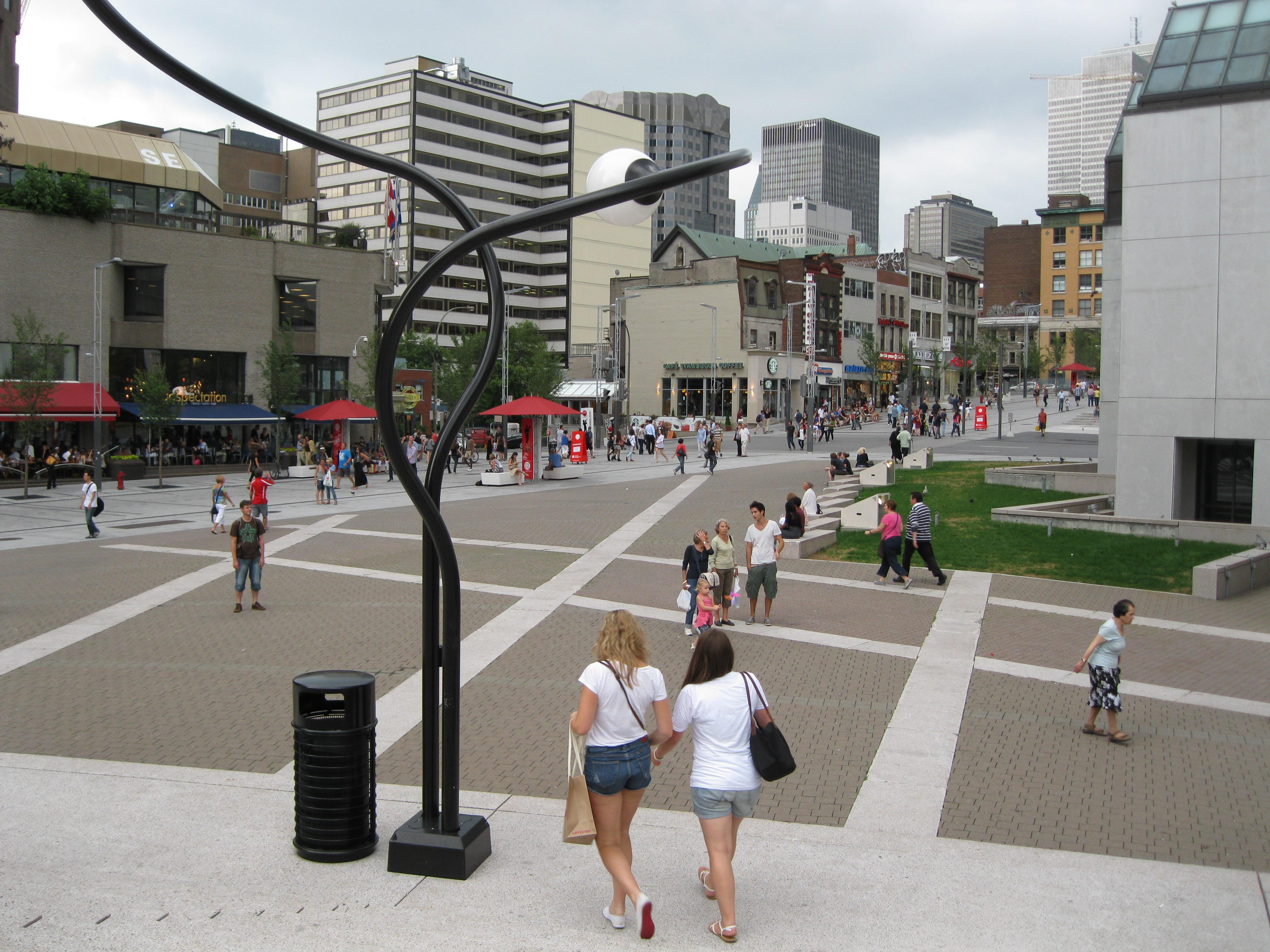
Place des Arts, facing Sainte-Catherine Street.

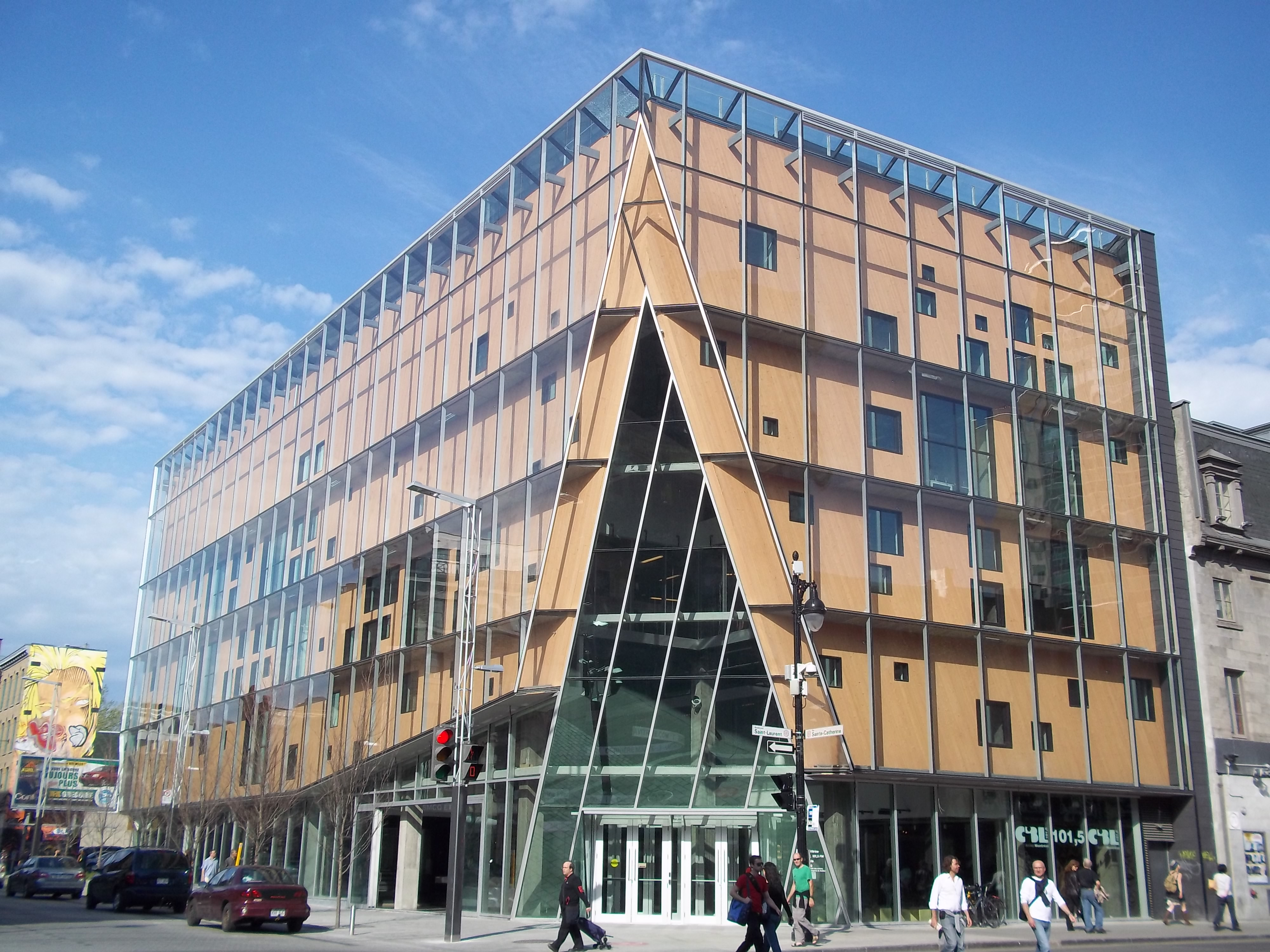
2-22 Sainte-Catherine Est.

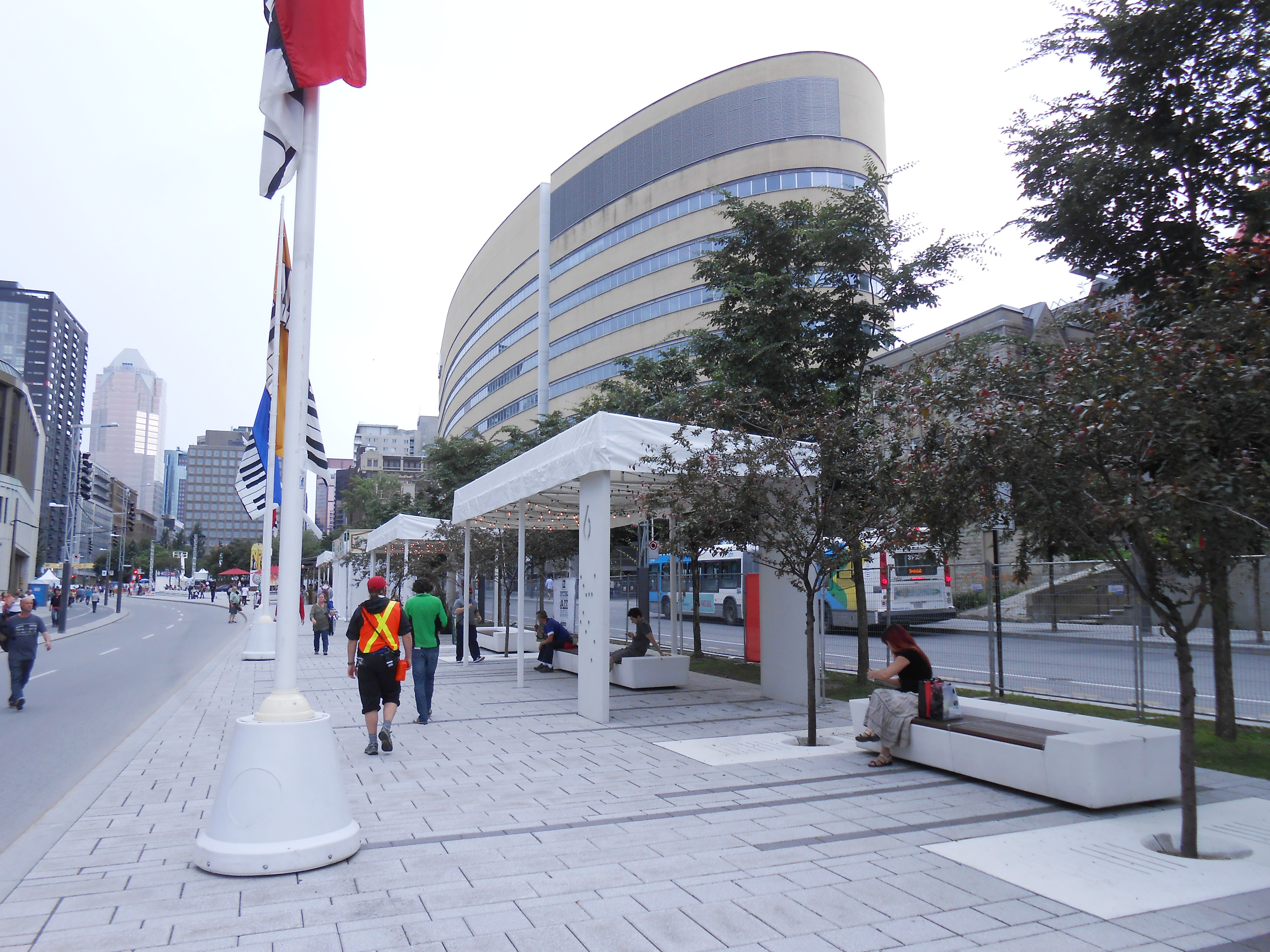
Promenade des Artistes.

Quartier des Spectacles (French pronunciation: [kaʁtje de spɛktakl]) is an arts and entertainment district located in the eastern section of Downtown Montreal, designed as a centre for Montreal's cultural events and festivals.

With a total area of almost one square kilometre, the Quartier is bounded by City Councillors Street to the West, Berri Street to the East, Sherbrooke Street to the North and René Lévesque Boulevard to the South, encompassing all of the district known as Montreal's Latin Quarter.

First proposed in 2002, the area is intended to house 30 performance halls totalling almost 28,000 seats (including the Place des Arts cultural complex), international festivals, art galleries and various cultural exhibition and broadcast facilities. The Quartier des spectacles hosts nearly 8,500 jobs linked to cultural activities, from education and creation to production, exhibition and broadcasting.

The area is now home to many of Montreal's major festivals, including the Montreal International Jazz Festival, the Francofolies and the Just for Laughs comedy fest. Urban design features of the district include concert spaces, tiered green space and stonework, illuminated fountains, various forms of street lighting, mist machines, bike paths and illuminated walkways.

The central public space for the Quartier is the Place des Festivals, a new urban square located on the "Balmoral Block" on Jeanne-Mance Street, facing Place des Arts. The latter has become a focal point for outdoor events. Features of the square include a water fountain with 235 in-ground jets, four light towers, two glass-encased restaurants, a grassy slope and granite walkways.

== New facilities ==
Édifice 2-22 is a cultural centre specializing in contemporary art. Its ticket office at the corner of Saint Catherine Street and Saint Laurent Boulevard was designed by French architect Paul Andreu.

The Maison du développement durable, designed by Menkès Shooner Dagenais LeTourneux Architectes and adjacent to the Théâtre du Nouveau Monde, was the second building in Canada to obtain the LEED Platinum sustainable building certification .

The district includes the Louis Bohème, a 28-storey condo tower designed also by Menkès Shooner Dagenais LeTourneux. The tower was approved despite objections from Montreal International Jazz Festival president Alain Simard.

In the fall of 2017, the National Film Board of Canada is scheduled to move its headquarters to Montreal's Quartier des spectacles, in a new building being constructed by the city of Montreal, adjacent to the Place des festivals square. The NFB will occupy the first four floors of the structure, which will allow the NFB to interface more closely with the public and expand its digital media research and production facilities.

=== List ===
- Théâtre Telus, a 12,000-square-foot (1,100 m^{2}) theatre, formerly the Berri Cinema.
- An expansion to the Société des arts technologiques.
- A new cultural space over the Saint-Laurent metro station, housing LADMMI, Les Ateliers de danse moderne de Montréal.
- A new lighting plan by Axel Morgenthaler.
- Maison du Festival Rio Tinto Alcan, occupying the former Blumenthal Building.
- Montreal Symphony House, a new concert hall for the Montreal Symphony Orchestra.
- The multidisciplinary artist-run center Dare-Dare is located near Metro St-Laurent since 2012.

== Pre-existing facilities ==
Pre-existing cultural facilities in the area demarcated by the Quartier des spectacles include:

- Place des Arts
- Musée d'art contemporain de Montréal
- Grande Bibliothèque
- Cinémathèque québécoise
- Théâtre Saint-Denis
- Salles du Gesù, Montreal's oldest theatre
- Théâtre du Nouveau Monde
- Monument-National, home to the National Theatre School of Canada
- Club Soda
- Belgo Building

== Demolished features ==
The area lost a key arts venue with the demolition of the Montreal Spectrum. Sixty-seven mature crabapple trees were cut down in a small square, Place Albert-Duquesne.

Montreal's former red light district on Saint-Laurent Boulevard is being demolished, with the facades of six buildings dismantled for possible future reuse, in a move condemned by advocacy group Heritage Montreal.

== Costs ==
In 2008, Mayor Gérald Tremblay stated that the project would come in as budgeted at $120-million and spur development in the immediate neighbourhood for a projected total of $1.9 billion in private investment.

In June 2012, it was reported by the Montreal Gazette that the cost of the district's public spaces alone would be $147 million, with $67 million from the city of Montreal and $40 million each from provincial and federal governments. In 2011, Montreal's auditor-general criticized the city for hand-picking one non-profit corporation, Angus Development, to build the 2-22 building and redevelop Saint-Laurent Blvd., and for failing to open the process up to tender, losing money by selling city land at below market value. Inadequate foundations, damage and wrong choice of joint sealants in 2011 also led to hundreds of thousands of dollars in repaving costs.

== Notable events ==
The 100th anniversary of the birth of Norman McLaren was marked by a National Film Board of Canada project entitled “McLaren Wall-to-Wall,” in which projections of short films inspired by four McLaren animated works were projected onto landmarks in the Quartier, from McLaren's birthday on April 11 to June 1, 2014.
