= Saint-Laurent station (Montreal Metro) =

Montreal Metro station

Saint-Laurent
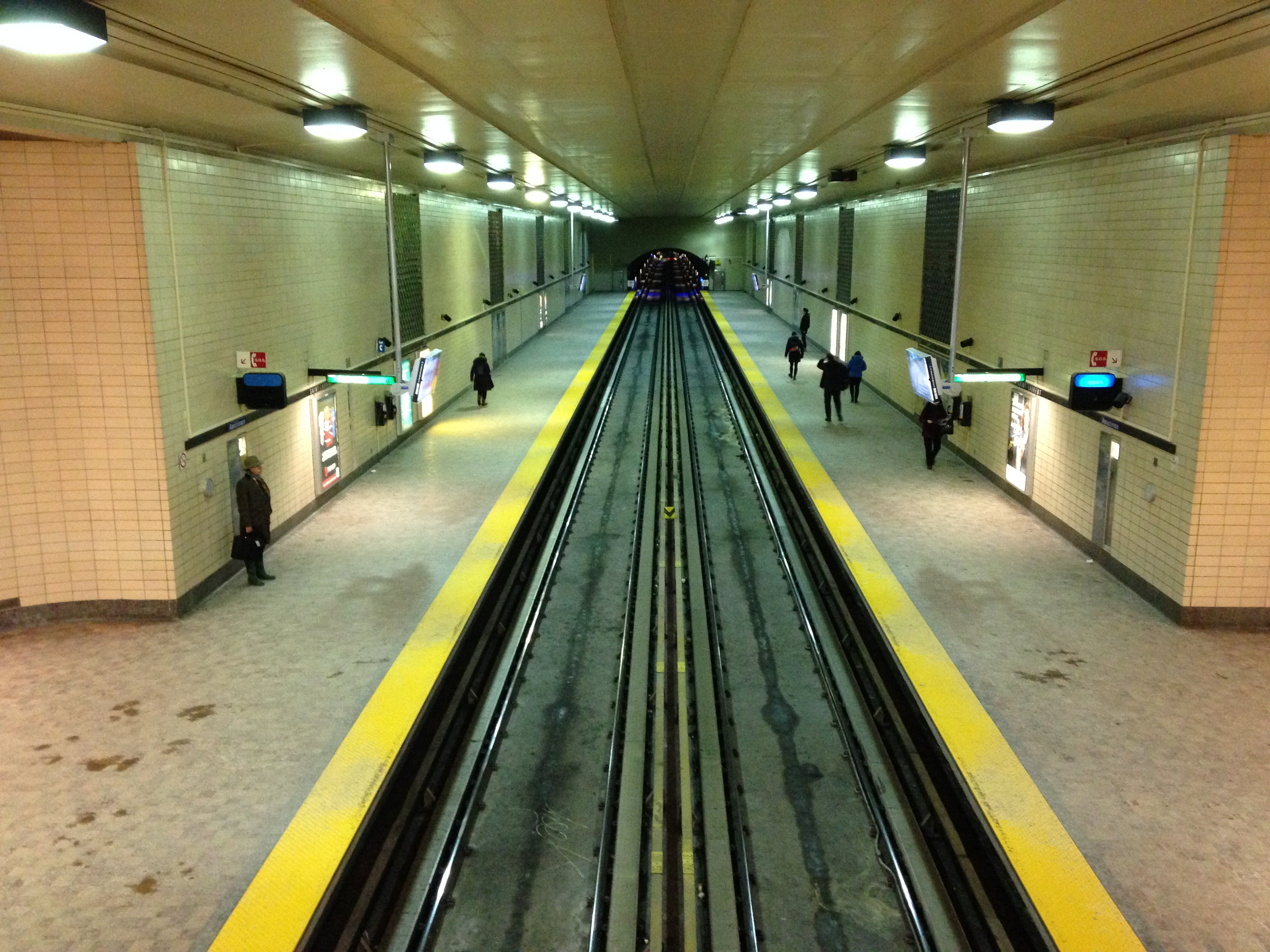

General information
- Location: 10, boul. de Maisonneuve Est; Montreal, Quebec H2X 1J5; Canada
- Coordinates: 45°30′39″N 73°33′53″W
- Operator: Société de transport de Montréal
- Platforms: 2 side platforms
- Tracks: 2
- Connections: STM bus

Construction
- Depth: 9.1 metres (29 feet 10 inches), 56th deepest
- Accessible: No
- Architect: Brassard et Warren

Other information
- Fare zone: ARTM: A

History
- Opened: 14 October 1966

Passengers
- 2024: 2,316,382 ▲4.15%
- Rank: 45 of 68

Services
Preceding station	Montreal Metro	Following station
Place-des-Arts toward Angrignon	Green Line	Berri–UQAM toward Honoré-Beaugrand
Location

Saint-Laurent station (French pronunciation: [sɛ̃ lɔʁɑ̃]) is a Montreal Metro station in the borough of Ville-Marie in Montreal, Quebec, Canada. It is operated by the Société de transport de Montréal (STM) and serves the Green Line. The station opened on October 14, 1966, as part of the original network of the Metro.

== Overview ==
Designed by Brassard et Warren, it is a normal side platform station, built in an open cut under boul. de Maisonneuve. The station's volume contains its mezzanine and ticket hall, connected to a single entrance. This is one of the few downtown stations not to have an entrance integrated into another building, and plans for the vacant lot around the station continually surface; the current plan is for a cultural centre, including a school of contemporary dance.

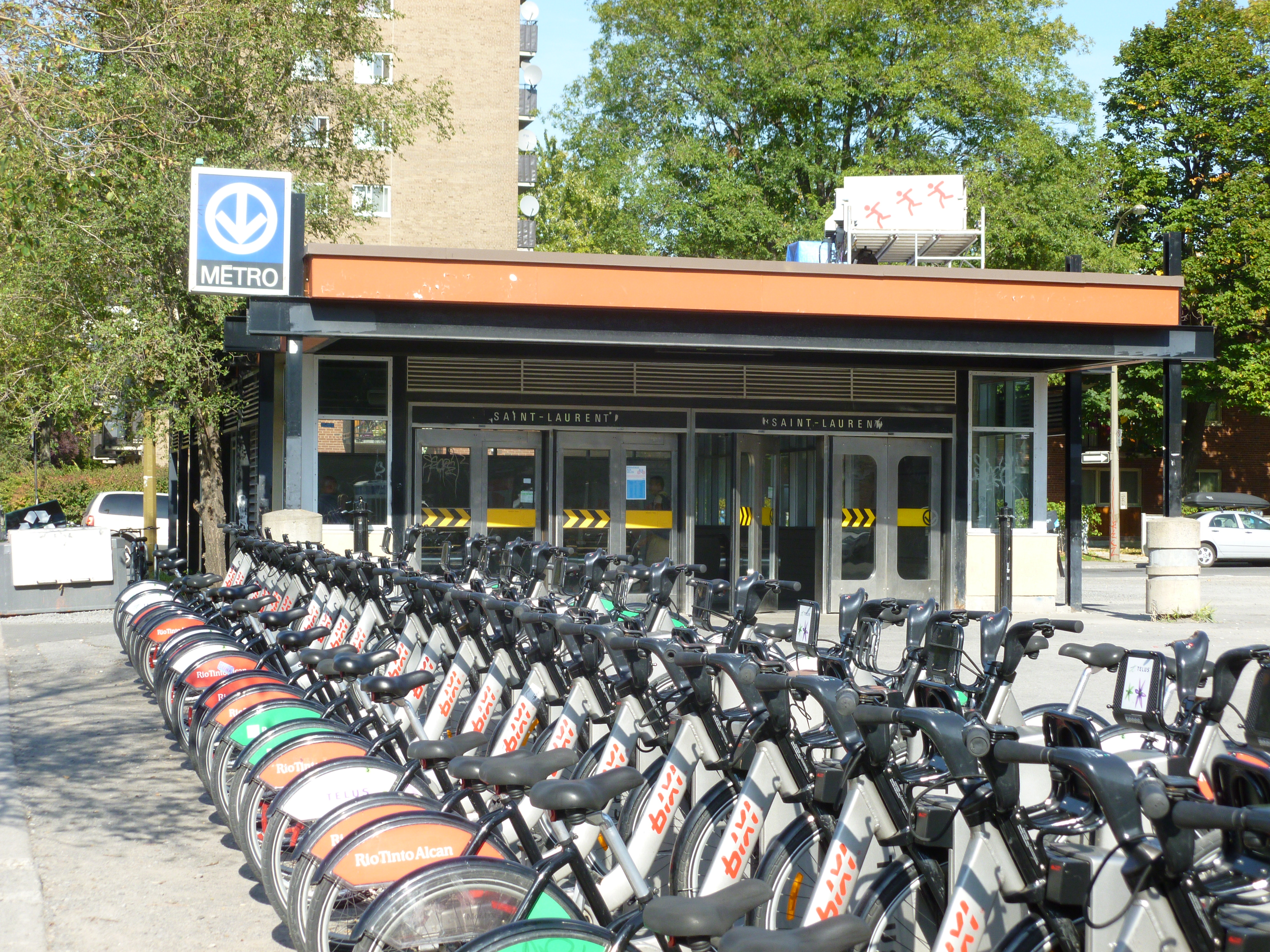
Bixi bicycle rack at the west entrance

== Architecture and art ==
The station contains non-figurative tiled murals by noted ceramicist Claude Vermette.

== Origin of the name ==
The station takes its name from Saint Laurent Boulevard (in French, boulevard Saint-Laurent), a main thoroughfare of Montreal, opened and named by 1720 as the road joining Montreal to the village of Côte-Saint-Laurent, now a borough of Montreal. The latter was named for Saint Lawrence, probably by allusion to the Saint Lawrence River. Saint Laurent Boulevard is considered the dividing line between eastern and western Montreal, and divides addresses between east and west.

== Connecting bus routes ==
Société de transport de Montréal
No.	Route	Connects to	Service times / notes
55	Saint-Laurent	Place-d'Armes; De Castelnau; Henri-Bourassa	Daily
363 ☾	Saint-Laurent	Henri-Bourassa; De Castelnau; Place-des-Arts (southbound); Place-d'Armes	Night service Northbound only

== Nearby points of interest ==
- UQAM
- Saint Laurent Boulevard
- Pavillon Ste-Catherine
- Ex-Centris
- Just for Laughs Museum
- Canadian Centre for International Studies and Cooperation (CECI)
