= Fortin =

Fortin is a surname, and may refer to:

Artists:

- Augustin Félix Fortin (1763–1832), French painter
- Charles Fortin (1815–1865), French painter
- Marc-Aurèle Fortin (1888–1970), Québécois painter
- Robert-Émile Fortin (1945–2004), Québécois painter

Politicians:

- André-Gilles Fortin (1943–1977), Social Credit Party member of the Canadian House of Commons
- Dean Fortin (born 1959), Canadian mayor of Victoria
- Émile Fortin (1878–1936), Conservative member of the Canadian House of Commons
- Gilles Fortin (1946–2021), Québécois provincial politician
- Jean-Baptiste Fortin (1764–1841) farmer and Canadian political figure
- Jean-François Fortin (politician) (born 1973), Bloc Québécois member of the Canadian House of Commons
- Joseph-Édouard Fortin (1884–1949), Québécois provincial politician
- Louis Fortin (1920–2005), Progressive Conservative party member of the Canadian House of Commons
- Louis-Napoléon Fortin (1850–1892), physician and Québécois provincial politician
- Pierre-Étienne Fortin (1823–1888), Quebec physician Conservative member of the Canadian House of Commons
- Roméo Fortin (1886–1953), Québécois provincial politician
- Thomas Fortin (1853–1933), Québécois lawyer, judge, educator and member of the Canadian House of Commons

Sportspeople:

- Alexandre Fortin (born 1997), Canadian ice hockey player
- Jean-François Fortin (ice hockey) (born 1979), Canadian ice hockey player
- Karolina Fortin (born 1991), Polish shogi player
- Marc-Antoine Fortin (born 1987), Canadian football player
- Marco Fortin (born 1974), Italian goalkeeper
- Ray Fortin (1941–2023), Canadian ice hockey player
- Richard Fortin (cricketer) (born 1941), Singapore-born English cricketer
- Roger Fortin (born 1951), Canadian boxer
- Roman Fortin (born 1967), American football player
- Stéphane Fortin (born 1974), Canadian football player

Others:

- Anne Fortin (born 1957), professor of accounting
- Dan Fortin, general manager of IBM Canada
- Dédé Fortin, (1962–2000), singer in Québécois band Les Colocs
- Ernest Fortin (1923–2002), American professor of theology
- Fred Fortin (born 1971), Canadian singer-songwriter
- Jean-François Fortin (chairman) (born 1947), French businessman and football club chairman
- Jean Nicolas Fortin, (1750–1831), French maker of scientific instruments, and editor of Atlas céleste de Flamstéed
- Judy Fortin (born 1961), American broadcaster
- Nicole Fortin (born c. 1954), Canadian economist
- Richard Fortin (businessman) (born 1949), Canadian businessman
- Madonna Fortin, the mother of singer Madonna.
