= Université du Québec à Montréal =

University based in Montreal, Quebec

University of Quebec in Montreal
- Université du Québec à Montréal
- Motto: Au centre de tout
- Motto in English: At the centre of everything
- Type: Public
- Established: 1969
- Academic affiliations: UACC, CARL
- Budget: CA$445.1 millions (2020–2021)
- Chancellor: Pauline Marois
- Rector: Stéphane Pallage (2023)
- Faculty: 1,143 professors & 2,124 instructors (2020–2021)
- Total staff: 1,892 (support) (2021–2022)
- Students: 39 427 (2020–2021)
- Undergraduates: 30 185 (2020–2021)
- Postgraduates: 6 433 (2020–2021)
- Doctoral students: 2 116 (2020–2021)
- Location: Montreal, Quebec, Canada; 45°30′50″N 73°33′37″W
- Campus: Urban
- Language: French
- Newspaper: Actualités UQAM
- Colours: White and blue
- Nickname: UQAM Citadins
- Sporting affiliations: CIS, QSSF, CBIE
- Mascot: Citadins
- Website: uqam.ca

The Université du Québec à Montréal (UQAM; French pronunciation: [ynivɛʁsite dy kebɛk a mɔ̃ʁeal]) (Note: lit. University of Quebec in Montreal. As with most Francophone post-secondary institutions in Quebec, the university does not have an official name in English, with the institution using the name Université du Québec à Montréal.) is a French-language public research university based in Montreal, Quebec, Canada. It is the largest constituent element of the Université du Québec system.

UQAM was founded on April 9, 1969, by the government of Quebec, through the merger of the École des beaux-arts de Montréal, a fine arts school; the Collège Sainte-Marie, a classical college; and a number of smaller schools. Although part of the UQ network, UQAM possesses a relative independence which allows it to choose its rector.

In the fall of 2018, the university welcomed some 40,738 students, including 3,859 international students from 95 countries, in a total of 310 distinct programs of study, managed by six faculties (Arts, Education, Communication, Political Science and Law, Science and Social science) and one school (Management). It offers Bachelors, Masters, and Doctoral degrees. It is one of Montreal's two French-language universities, along with the Université de Montréal, and only 1% of its student population is of English-speaking origin.

== History ==
UQAM was created on April 9, 1969, by the Government of Quebec, following the merger of the École des beaux-arts de Montréal, the Collège Sainte-Marie and three colleges.

In mid 1970, construction on UQAM's campus began in the Saint-Jacques neighbourhood. The old Saint-Jacques Cathedral was condemned and the worshipers were moved to the Chapel of Notre-Dame-de-Lourdes. The architect of the university, Dimitri Dimakopoulos, chose to respect the plans of John Ostell and Victor Bourgeau by deciding to graft the new construction around the wall of the nave of the church overlooking Saint Catherine Street and highlighting the bell tower and its gateway. These remains are classified as historic monuments by the Quebec government. The new campus of UQAM was inaugurated in September 1979.

Before the arrival of the Université du Québec à Montréal, access to higher education was limited for the French-speaking working classes. Thanks to the policy of admitting adults with relevant professional experience, the student population was able to broaden the student population to include social categories previously excluded from higher education, thus creating a climate of openness.

UQAM has a strong tradition of trade unionism amongst its workers. The Syndicat des professeurs et professeures de l'Université du Québec à Montréal (SPUQ), affiliated since its 1970 creation with the Confédération des syndicats nationaux (CSN), has participated in the effort to democratize the functioning of university authorities.

In November 2006, UQAM underwent a major financial crisis. It was revealed that the former president, Roch Denis, was partially responsible for the financial mismanagement of the Science Complex and the Ilot Voyageur real estate projects. A recovery plan, required by the Ministry of Education, Sport and Leisure, is still in progress, raising significant challenges from groups of employees, students, lecturers and professors.

With the addition of the Télé-université in June 2005, UQAM, with a student population of close to 60,000, was the largest French-speaking university in the world. On 13 January 2012, it was announced that the TELUQ would again become a separate university from UQAM, but would remain in the Université du Québec system.

== Campus ==
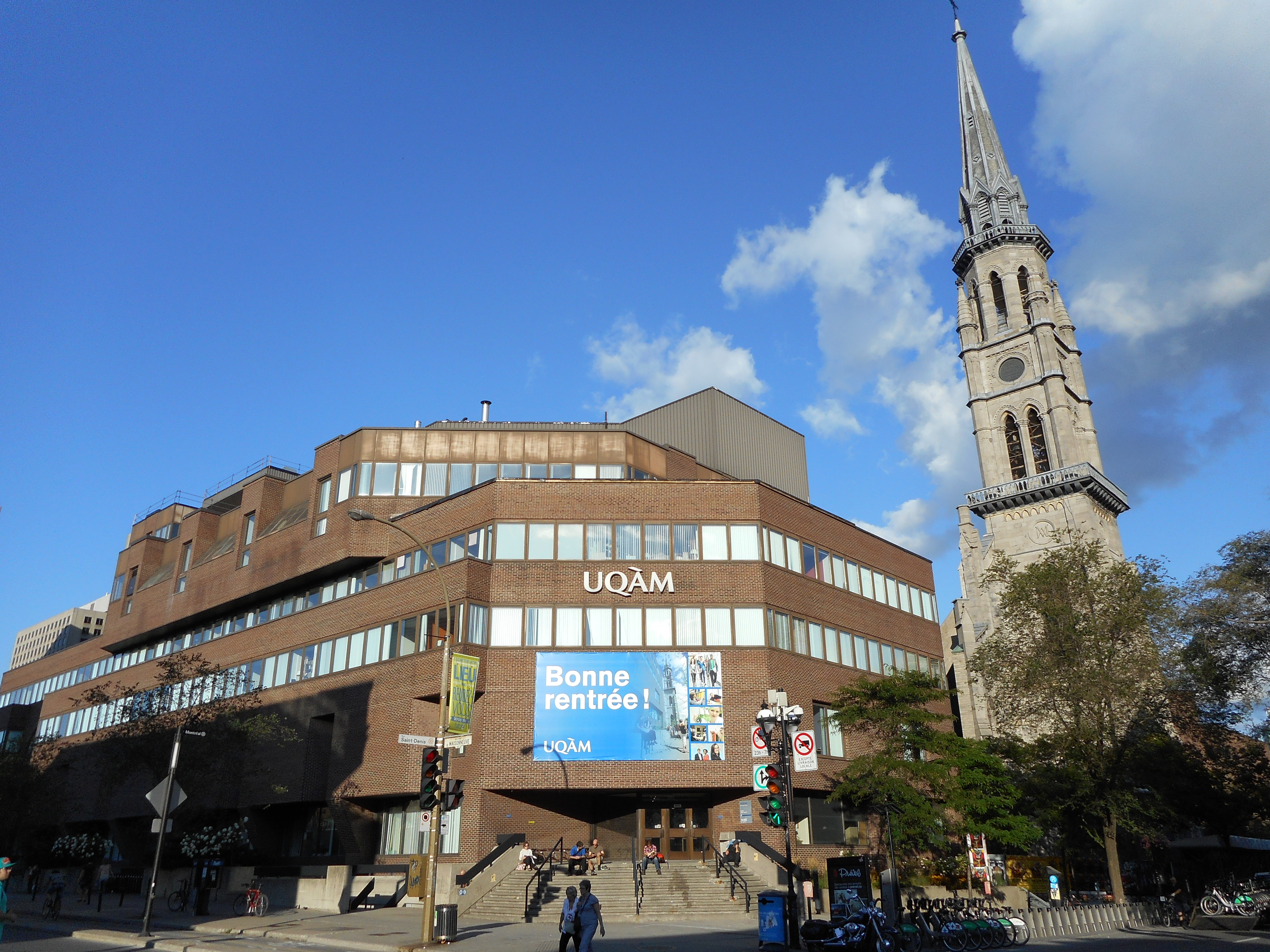
Judith-Jasmin pavillon

UQAM's campus was designed by Dimitri Dimakopoulos and is located in downtown Montreal in the borough of Ville-Marie, with most of its buildings in the Quartier Latin neighbourhood near the Berri–UQAM metro station and the newer Complexe des sciences Pierre-Dansereau near Place des Arts. The university is also involved in the troubled Îlot Voyageur project, a 13-storey student residence and intercity bus terminal, but has had to scale back its involvement due to financial problems. In September 2013, the university announced that it had acquired the National Film Board of Canada's former CineRobotheque facility for its communications faculty.

The university provides training on its campus in Montreal and its four regional centres: UQAM Lanaudière in Terrebonne, UQAM Laval, UQAM Montérégie in Longueuil and UQAM Ouest-de-l'île.

A three part virtual exhibition was made to showcase the university's history.

== Academics ==
=== Faculties ===
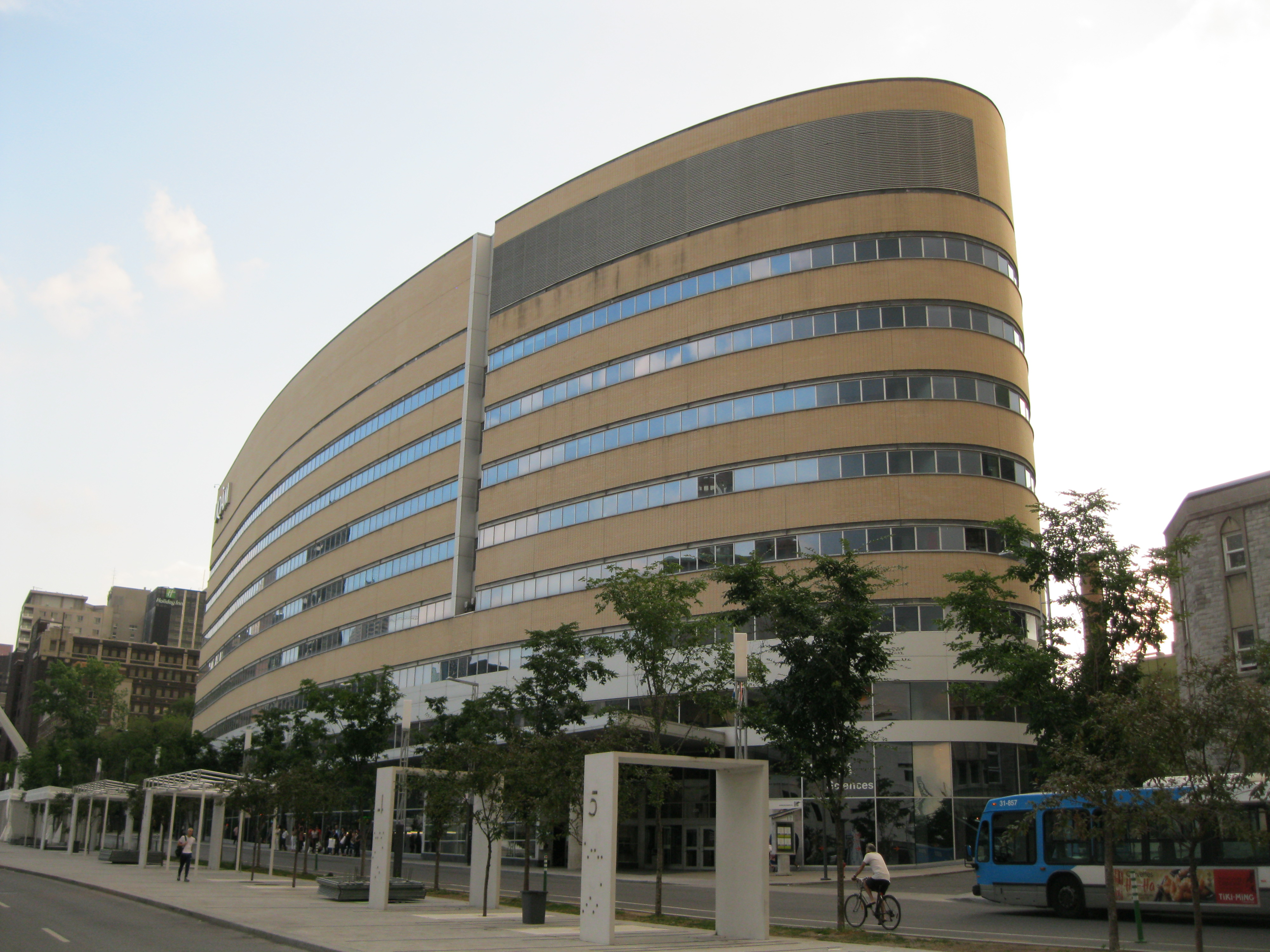
UQAM Président-Kennedy building, Montreal.

- Faculté des arts (Faculty of Arts)
- Faculté des sciences de l'éducation (Faculty of Education)
- Faculté de communication (Faculty of Communication)
- Faculté de science politique et de droit (Faculty of Political Science and Law)
- Faculté des sciences (Faculty of Sciences)
- Faculté des sciences humaines (Faculty of Social Sciences)
- École des sciences de la gestion (ESG) (UQAM's School of Management Sciences)

=== Schools and institutes ===
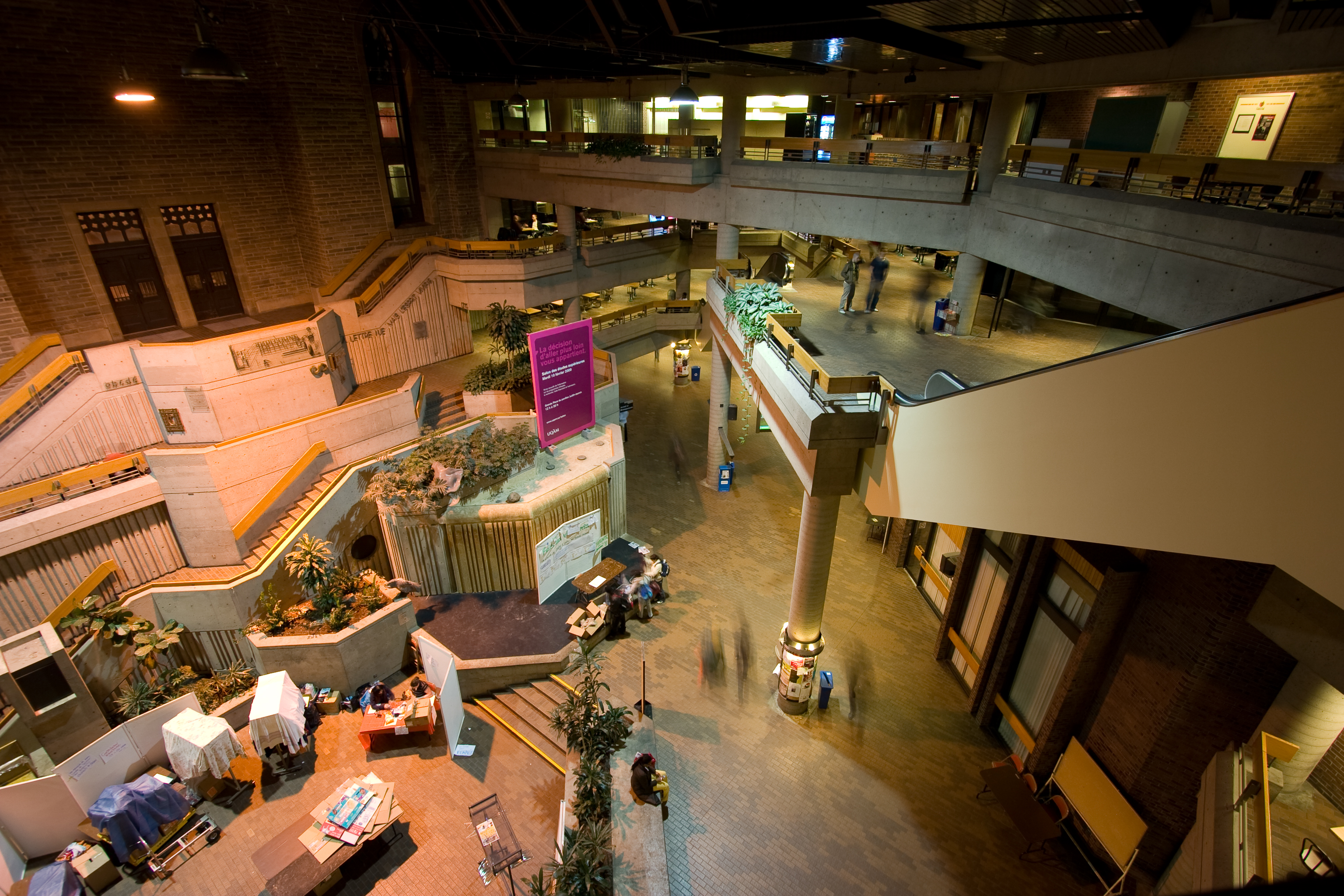
Interior of the Judith Jasmin building

- École supérieure de mode de Montréal (Montreal Graduate School of Fashion Design)
- Institut de recherches et d'études féministes (Institute of Feminist Studies)
- Institut des sciences cognitives (Institute of Cognitive Sciences)
- Institut des sciences de l'environnement (Institute of Environmental Sciences)
- Institut d'études internationales de Montréal (Montreal Institute of International Studies)
- Institut Santé et société (Health and Society Institute)
- École supérieure de théâtre (Graduate School of Theatre)
- École des langues (Language School)
- École de travail social (School of Social Work)
- École des arts visuels et médiatiques (School of Visual Arts and Media)
- Institut du patrimoine (Heritage Institute)
- International Research Group on Animal Law

The university is represented in Canadian Interuniversity Sport by the UQAM Citadins.

=== Distance and online learning ===
UQAM is part of the Université du Québec network, which has a distance learning component called Télé-université (Teluq). It offers courses and degrees in computer science, education, communication, environmental science, and management. University of Québec has improved geographical accessibility through multiple campuses spread throughout the province and by offering distance education by Télé-Université.

=== Other programs ===
The university is an active member of the University of the Arctic. UArctic is an international cooperative network based in the Circumpolar Arctic region, consisting of more than 200 universities, colleges, and other organizations with an interest in promoting education and research in the Arctic region.

UQAM participates in UArctic's mobility program north2north. The aim of that program is to enable students of member institutions to study in different parts of the North.

== Notable people ==
- Bianca Beauchamp, fashion model
- Louise Beaudoin, former Quebec minister of international relations
- Steven Blaney, businessman, politician, minister of public safety, minister of Veterans Affairs and minister of State
- Pierre Bourgault, former leader of the RIN party and Quebec independence activist
- Pierre Dansereau, pioneer of ecology
- Joseph Facal, politician, academic, and journalist
- Anne Fortin, accounting professor
- Pierre Fortin, economist
- Ying Gao, fashion designer and professor
- Alexandre Gauthier, Software Engineer, co-founder of Crusader Technologies and DecisionPoint Software
- Louis Hamelin, journalist and fiction writer
- Stevan Harnad, Open Access activist
- Isabelle Hénault, psychologist
- Arthur Lamothe, film director, screenwriter, and film producer
- Bernard Landry, former Quebec Prime Minister
- Daniel Langlois, Founder of Softimage, Ex-Centris
- Léo-Paul Lauzon, left-wing activist and former NDP candidate
- Gérald Larose, union leader
- André Éric Létourneau, artist
- Scott McKay, politician, former Green Party of Quebec leader and Montreal council member
- Viviane Namaste, scholar, author, researcher, and professor
- Gilbert Paquette, former Quebec minister of science and technology
- Pierre Karl Péladeau, Canadian businessman, billionaire, and former politician
- Léa Pool, filmmaker
- Régine Robin, novelist
- Yves Séguin, former Quebec minister of finance
- Paul Tom, filmmaker
- Jean-Marc Vallée, filmmaker
- Jovette Marchessault, writer
- Marc Parent, Montreal Police Department director
- Paul Tana, professor, filmmaker
- Denis Villeneuve, filmmaker
- Martin Villeneuve, screenwriter, producer, actor, art director, and TED speaker

== Reputation ==
University rankings

World rankings
- ARWU World: 701–800
- USNWR World: 745
- 23–24

Canadian rankings
- USNWR National: 23
- Maclean's Comprehensive: 12
- Maclean's Reputation: 26

- Charles-Rousseau competition in international law. Third victory in a row (2007)
- NMUN Outstanding Delegation Award: 2006, 2008, 2009, 2010, 2011, 2012, 2013, 2014, 2016, 2017, 2018, 2019; Distinguished Delegation Award 2015
- International NATO Simulation 2014: Distinguished Delegate Award NPG, Distinguished Delegate Award DG, Superior Delegation Award
- International NATO Simulation 2015: Committee Leadership Award
- School of business is ranked sixth in Canada by EFMD-EQUIS

== Finances ==
A commissioned report by PricewaterhouseCoopers has called for cost-cutting measures at UQAM to help the university out of a financial crisis, brought on by $100 million in construction cost overruns for its sciences centre and costs for Îlot Voyageur, which soared from $226 million to more than $400 million when the Quebec government pulled out of the project, citing unauthorized design changes. The Quebec government has said that unless UQAM cuts costs, the university's total project-related debt could be $500 million by 2012. The Îlot Voyageur has been bought back by the government of Quebec in November 2010, thus solving a painful financial problem for UQAM.

== See also ==
- List of universities in Quebec
- Education in Montreal
- Higher education in Quebec
- Canadian Interuniversity Sport
- Canadian government scientific research organizations
- Canadian university scientific research organizations
- Canadian industrial research and development organizations
