= French name =

French names typically consist of one or multiple given names, and a surname. One given name, usually the first, and the surname are used in a person's daily life, with the other given names used mainly in official documents. Middle names, in the English sense, do not exist. Initials are not used to represent second or further given names.

Traditionally, most French people were given names from the Roman Catholic calendar of saints. However, given names for French citizens from immigrant communities are often from their own culture, and in modern France it has become increasingly common to use first names of (international) English or other foreign origin. Almost all traditional given names are gender-specific, but a few are not. Many female given names are feminine forms of traditional masculine French names. The prevalence of given names follows trends, with some names being popular in some years, and some considered out-of-fashion. Compound given names are not uncommon. (The second part may be one normally used by the opposite sex; the gender of the compound is determined by the first part.) First names are chosen by the child's parents. Nowadays, there are no legal a priori constraints on the choice of names, though this was not always the case as recently as a few decades ago. To change a given name, a request can be made before a court, but except in a few specific cases, one must prove a legitimate interest for the change.

Children in France were until 2005 required by law to take the surname of their father, unless the father was unknown and the child was given the family name of the mother. Since 2005, parents can give their children either of their names, or a hyphenation of both, subject to a limit of at most two hyphenated names. In case the two parents cannot come to an agreement, both of their family names are used and hyphenated in alphabetical order; if one of them already has a hyphenated surname, only one word, the first surname, is taken from each parent. The ratio of the number of family names to the population is high in France, primarily because most surnames had many orthographic and dialectal variants, which were then registered as separate names. Contrary to the practice of some other countries, French women do not legally change names when they marry; however, it is customary that they adopt their husband's name as a "usage name" for daily life. This distinction is important because many official documents use the person's maiden, or legal or true surname, rather than their usage name. Some artists change their real name to their stage name, but truly changing one's last name, as opposed to adopting a usage name, is a quite complex legal process.

== Styles and forms of address ==
=== Madame, Mademoiselle, Monsieur ===
In normal polite usage, a person's name is usually preceded by:

- Monsieur, for a male (etymologically, monsieur means "my lord", cf. English "sir"); pronounced [məsjø]; plural: messieurs, pronounced [mesjø]; abbreviation: singular M.; plural: MM.. The singular form M^{r} is very often found, but is considered incorrect by purists, although it appears (together with its rare plural form M^{rs}) in some dictionaries.
- Madame, for a married female (etymologically, madame means "my lady", cf. English "dame"); pronounced [madam]; plural: mesdames, pronounced [medam]; abbreviation: M^{me}; plural: M^{mes}. Madame must also be used when one does not know whether the addressed woman is married or not, and when one does not know whether the addressed woman may consider the use of Mademoiselle as discriminating or disrespectful.
- Mademoiselle, for an unmarried female (etymologically, mademoiselle means "my damsel", cf. English "damsel"); pronounced [madmwazɛl]; plural: mesdemoiselles, pronounced [medmwazɛl]; abbreviation: M^{lle} or M^{le}; plural: M^{lles} or M^{les}. This form of address is informal and is now tending to be less used in favour of madame by some groups such as feminist movements because they consider the usage to be discriminating and disrespectful. However, one tendency that remains fairly common is the addressing of young-looking females mademoiselle, and older females madame. Actresses are usually always styled mademoiselle, especially in film or theatre credits, regardless of their age or personal situation; one would thus read mademoiselle Deneuve est habillée par Soandso.

Since 2013, French administration does not use the term mademoiselle anymore for its documents in favour of madame regardless of the status and the age of the woman addressed.

- Mondamoiseau is an archaic term historically used for a gentleman that had not yet reached the status of chevalier, and was used in a similar fashion as the modern mademoiselle; plural: mesdemoiseaux. The term has not been in common use since the 17th century, but it can be found in works of classic French literature, such as Molière's L'Avare.
- Maître, for males and females (etymologically, maître means "master"); this title is used by lawyers and few other juridical professions, while carrying out their duties, and for some mature male artists; plural: maîtres; abbreviation: M^{e}; there is no abbreviation for maîtres, one should use M^{e} X and M^{e} Y.
- Docteur, for males and females (etymologically, docteur means "doctor"); this title is reserved for people having a doctorate but tend to be mostly used in everyday language for physicians and dentists while carrying out their duties, even when still students thus not having yet a doctorate; plural: docteurs; abbreviation: D^{r}. The feminine form docteure (pronounced the same way as docteur) is becoming more common. The feminine form doctoresse is now old-fashioned but can still be used, especially when speaking of a female physician.

During the Ancien Régime, a female commoner was always addressed as mademoiselle, even when married, madame being limited to women of the high nobility, even if they were not married. This practice ceased after the French Revolution.

A traditional address to a crowd of people is Mesdames, Messieurs or Mesdames, Mesdemoiselles, Messieurs—whose order of words represents decreasing degrees of respect. An informal variant is Messieurs-Dames; it is considered as ill-mannered by purists.

It is normally impolite to address people by their given names unless one is a family member, a friend or a close colleague of comparable hierarchic importance. One also does not address people by their last name only unless in a work environment. Also, contrary to English or German usage, it is considered impolite to address someone as monsieur X when talking to that person: a mere monsieur should be used, monsieur X being reserved for talking about M. X to another person.

When speaking of someone, monsieur/madame given name family name, by far the most polite form of address, is generally reserved for the most solemn occasions. Monsieur/madame family name or given name family name is polite and used in normal formal occasions, as well as in the formal quality press (Le Monde, Le Monde diplomatique, for example). By contrast, in colloquial usage the family names of personalities are used alone. Formally, a married or widowed woman can be called by the given name of her husband (madame (given name of husband) family name or madame veuve (given name of husband) family name); this is now slightly out of fashion, except on formal invitation cards (in France, on a formal invitation card, the traditional formula is always a variant of "Madame Jean Dupont recevra...". The traditional use of the first name of the woman's husband is now felt in this context as a way to include the husband as equally inviting alongside his wife, while keeping the tradition of reception being formally held by the wife.

In the workplace or in academic establishments, particularly in a male-dominated environment, it is quite common to refer to male employees by their family name only, but to use madame or mademoiselle before the names of female employees.

=== Military ===
A military officer is addressed by his rank (and under no circumstance by monsieur, but a group of officers can be addressed by plural messieurs). Male officers of the Army, the Gendarmerie and the Air Force are addressed as Mon [rank] by inferior ranks and deferential civilians. This usage is said not to be the possessive pronoun mon, but an abbreviation of monsieur: consequently, women are not referred to with mon, but with the rank alone (for example Général rather than mon Général).

As a punishment by Napoléon Bonaparte, Navy officers have not been addressed as mon since the Battle of Trafalgar. Confusingly, the title generally does not match the rank, but rather an equivalent rank in other forces: lieutenant is the form of address for an enseigne de vaisseau, capitaine for a lieutenant de vaisseau, and commandant for a capitaine de corvette, frégate, or vaisseau. The commanding officer of a ship is also addressed as commandant, regardless of his/her actual rank.

In everyday written contexts, ranks are abbreviated.

== Given names ==
French people have at least one given name. Usually, only one of them is used in daily life; any others are solely for official documents, such as passports or certificates. Thus, one always speaks of Jacques Chirac and never of Jacques René Chirac; Henri Philippe Bénoni Omer Joseph Pétain is always referred to as Philippe Pétain, because Philippe was the given name that he used in daily life. Middle names in the English sense do not exist; initials are never used for second or further given names. For example, although English-speaking scientific publications may cite Claude Allègre as Claude J. Allègre, this is not done in French-speaking publications.

Second and further given names, when given, typically honour a child's grandparents, great-grandparents, or other ancestors. The practice of giving two or even three names has since fallen slightly out of fashion, but remains more common in upper-class milieus.

Traditionally and historically, most people were given names from the Roman Catholic calendar of saints. Common names of this type are Jacques (James), Jean (John), Michel (Michael), Pierre (Peter), and Jean-Baptiste (John the Baptist) for males; and Marie (Mary), Jeanne (Jane), Marguerite (Margaret), Françoise (Frances), and Élisabeth (Elizabeth) for females. In certain regions such as Brittany or Corsica, more local names (usually of local saints) are often used (in Brittany, for instance, male Corentin or female Anne; in Corsica, Ange (suitable both for males and females, French version corresponding to Corsican Angelo, Angela). However, given names for French citizens from immigrant communities are often from their own culture, such as Mohammed, Karim, Saïd, Toufik, Jorge, etc. for males, Fatima, Fatoumata, etc. for females. Furthermore, in recent decades it has become common to use first names of English or other foreign origin, mainly in the popular classes of society, such as Kevin, Enzo, or Anthony (instead of Antoine in the upper classes) for males; for females, Jessica, Jennifer, Karine or Barbara (instead of Barbe, now out of fashion, because it sounds exactly the same as barbe "beard" as in the expression la barbe! "What a drag! / How boring!"). Also, females are often given names like Jacqueline and Géraldine that are feminine forms of traditional common masculine French names.

The prevalence of given names follows trends, with some names being popular in some years, and some considered definitely out-of-fashion. As an example, few children born since 1970 would bear the name Germaine, which is generally associated with the idea of an elderly lady. However, as noted above, such old-fashioned names are frequently used as second or third given names, because in France the second or further given names are traditionally those of the godparents or the grandparents. Some older names, such as Suzanne, Violette, and Madeleine, have become fashionable again in the upper class and in the upper middle class. Others such as Jean, Pierre, Louis, and François never really went out of fashion. Alexandre (Alexander) was never very popular, but is not uncommon in middle and upper classes.

Almost all traditional given names are gender-specific. However, a few given names, such as Dominique (see above: completely gender-neutral), Claude (traditionally masculine), and Camille (traditionally masculine, now mostly feminine), are given to both males and females; for others, the pronunciation is the same but the spelling is different: Frédéric (m) / Frédérique (f). In medieval times, a woman was often named Philippe (Philippa), now an exclusively masculine name (Philip), or a male Anne (Ann), now almost exclusively feminine (except as second or third given name, mostly in Brittany). From the mid-19th century into the early 20th century, Marie was a popular first name for both men or women, however, before and after that period it has been almost exclusively given to women as a first given name, although it is sometimes given to males as second or third given name, especially in devout Catholic families.

Compound given names, such as Jean-Luc, Jean-Paul and Anne-Sophie are not uncommon. These are not considered to be two separate given names. The second part of a compound name may be a given name normally used by the opposite sex. However, the gender of the compound is determined by the first component. Thus, Marie-George Buffet has a given name considered as female because it begins with Marie, and George is spelled with a final -e like all the traditional French female given names, instead of Georges with -es for a male. The feminine component in male compound names is mostly Marie, as in Jean-Marie Vianney. In the past, some Frenchmen would have Marie or Anne as first name (example: Anne du Bourg), which is still nowadays in practice in rare traditional Catholic families (but then the man will have other given names and one of those will be used in everyday life). Second or third given names, which usually are kept private, may also include names normally used by the opposite gender. For instance, in 2006, 81 Frenchmen have Brigitte among their given names, 97 Catherine, 133 Anne, and 204 Julie. In addition to the above-described custom of using Marie for males, this is due to the habit of traditional Catholic French families to give children the names of their godmother and godfather: if there is no counterpart of the opposite gender for the name of the godparent who is not of the same sex as the child, generally the name of the godparent will be left as such. For instance, a male child born to a traditional Catholic family choosing for him the name Nicolas and whose godparents are called Christian and Véronique could be called Nicolas Christian Marie Véronique.

First names are chosen by the child's parents. There are no legal a priori constraints on the choice of names nowadays, but this has not always been the case. The choice of given names, originally limited only by the tradition of naming children after a small number of popular saints, was restricted by law at the end of the 18th century, could be accepted. Much later, actually in 1966, a new law permitted a limited number of mythological, regional or foreign names, substantives (Olive, Violette), diminutives, and alternative spellings. Only in 1993 were French parents given the freedom to name their child without any constraint whatsoever. However, if the birth registrar thinks that the chosen names (alone or in association with the last name) may be detrimental to the child's interests, or to the right of other families to protect their own family name, the registrar may refer the matter to the local prosecutor, who may choose to refer the matter to the local court. The court may then refuse the chosen names. Such refusals are rare and mostly concern given names that may expose the child to mockery.

To change a given name, a request can be made before a court (juge des affaires familiales), but except in a few specific cases (such as the Gallicization of a foreign name), it is necessary to prove a legitimate interest for the change (usually that the current name is a cause of mockery or when put together with the surname, it creates a ridiculous word or sentence, e.g.: Jean Bon sounds jambon "ham", or Annick Mamère = A nique ma mère, slang for "she fucks my mother").

== Surnames ==
It is believed that the number of surnames in France at all times since 1990 has been between 800,000 and 1,200,000. The number of surnames is high proportional to the population; most surnames have many orthographic and dialectal variants (more than 40 for some), which were registered as entirely separate names around 1880 when "family vital records booklets" were issued.

According to the Institute of Statistics (INSEE), more than 1,300,000 surnames were registered in the country between 1891 and 1990, and about 200,000 have disappeared (mainly unique orthographic variants). According to different estimates, 50 to 80 percent of French citizens may bear rare family names (fewer than 50 bearers alive at the census time). Not all family names are of French origin, as many families have some immigrant roots.

=== French naming law (surnames) ===
In France, until 2005, children were required by law to take the surname of their father. If the father was unknown, the child was given the family name of the mother. Since 2005, article 311-21 of the French Civil code permits parents to give their children the father's name, the mother's name, or a hyphenation of both: although no more than two names can be hyphenated. In cases of disagreement, both parents' family names are hyphenated, in alphabetic order, with only the first of their names, if they each have a hyphenated name themselves. A 1978 declaration by the Council of Europe requires member governments to take measures to adopt equality of rights in the transmission of family names, a measure that was repeated by the United Nations in 1979. Similar measures were adopted by Germany (1976), Sweden (1982), Denmark (1983), Spain (1999), and Austria (2013).

In France, a person may use a name of a third party (called the common name) in the following circumstances:

- anyone – to add or use the name of a parent whose name he does not bear. This results from the application of Article 43 of Law No. 85-1372 of 23 December 1985. For example, in the case of children of divorced and remarried parents, to help differentiate the family composition.
- married people or widows – by adding or substituting the name of their spouse. Substituting the name of the husband is an established custom but has never been enshrined in law. For example, social security laws require the wife and husband to provide the "maiden name" or birth name. This right also applies to divorced couples, provided that the ex-spouse does not object and the other has a legitimate interest, such as because they have custody of the couple's children.

Since Law No. 2003-516 of 18 June 2003 on the devolution of family names, there is no longer any distinction between the name of the mother and the father. A child may receive the family name of one or the other, or both family names. Decree No. 2004-1159 of 29 October 2004 implemented Law No. 2002-304 of 4 March 2002, provided that children born on or after 1 January 2004 and children changing names, may have or use only the family name of the father or the mother or both family names. However, whichever form is used, a person's name must be used consistently on all identification documents, such as a passport or identity card.

=== Most common French surnames ===
#	Belgium Wallonia	Canada Québec	France		
#	2008	2006	1891-1990	1966-1990	c. 2007
1	Dubois	Tremblay	Martin		
2	Lambert	Gagnon	Bernard		
3	Martin	Roy	Thomas		Dubois
4	Dupont	Côté	Petit	Robert	Thomas
5	Simon	Bouchard	Robert	Petit	Robert
6	Dumont	Gauthier	Richard	Dubois	Richard
7	Leclercq	Morin	Durand	Richard	Petit
8	Laurent	Lavoie	Dubois	Garcia	Durand
9	Lejeune	Fortin	Moreau	Durand	Leroy
10	Renard	Gagné	Laurent	Moreau	

This list masks strong regional differences in France and the increasing number of foreign names among the French citizens.

Table based on births between 1966 and 1990:
#	Alsace	Basse- Normandie	Brittany	Île-de-France	Provence-Alpes- Côte d'Azur
1	Meyer	Marie	Le Gall	Martin	Martin
2	Muller	Martin	Thomas	Da Silva	Garcia
3	Schmitt	Jeanne	Le Goff	Pereira	Martinez
4	Schneider	Duval	Le Roux	Petit	Blanc
5	Klein	Lefèvre	Martin	Dos Santos	Fernandez
6	Weber	Leroy	Simon	Ferreira	Lopez
7	Fischer	Hébert	Tanguy	Rodrigues	Roux
8	Martin	Guérin	Hamon	Dubois	Sanchez
9	Weiss	Simon	Hervé	Bernard	Perez
10	Walter	Hamel	Morvan	Fernandes	Michel

=== Particles ===
Some French last names include a prefix called a particle (French: particule), a preposition or article at the beginning of the name. The most widespread of these are de (meaning "of"), le or la ("the"), and Du or de La ("of the").

A common misconception is that particules indicate some noble or feudal origin of the name, but this is not always the case. Many non-noble people have particules in their names simply because they indicate the family's geographic origin. One example is Dominique de Villepin. French statesman Charles de Gaulle's surname may not be a traditional French name with a toponymic particule, but a Flemish Dutch name that evolved from a form of De Walle meaning "the wall".

In the case of nobility, titles are mostly of the form [title] [particle] [name of the land]: for instance, Louis, duc d'Orléans ("Louis, duke of Orléans"), or simply Louis d'Orléans. Former president Valéry Giscard d'Estaing's father had his surname legally changed from "Giscard" to "Giscard d'Estaing" in 1922, claiming the name of a family line extinct since the French Revolution.

Adding a particule was one way for people of non-noble origins to pretend they were nobles. In the 19th century, wealthy commoners buying nobility titles were derisively called Monsieur de Puispeu, a pun on depuis peu meaning "since recently". Similarly, during the French Revolution of 1789–1799, when being associated with the nobility was out of favor and even risky, some people dropped the de from their name, or omitted the mention of their feudal titles.

In some cases, names with particules are made of a normal family name and the name of an estate (or even of several estates). Thus, Dominique de Villepin is Dominique Galouzeau de Villepin; Hélie de Saint Marc is Hélie Denoix de Saint Marc (in both cases, omitting second or other given names). As in these examples, most people with such long family names shorten their name for common use, by keeping only the first estate name (such as Viscount Philippe Le Jolis de Villiers de Saintignon, assuming in everyday life the name of Philippe de Villiers) or, in some cases, only the family name. Whether the family name or the estate name is used for the shortened form depends on a variety of factors: how people feel bearing a particule (people may for instance dislike the connotations of nobility that the particule entails; on the other hand, they may enjoy the impression of nobility), tradition, etc. For instance, Valéry Giscard d'Estaing is never referred to as "d'Estaing", probably because his particule is a recent addition to the family surname by his father. On the contrary, the press often simply refers to him as "Giscard".

Traditionally, the particule de is omitted when citing the name of a person without a preceding given name, title (baron, duc etc.), job description (général, colonel, etc.) or polite address (monsieur, madame, mademoiselle). Thus, one would say Monsieur de La Vieuville, but if calling him familiarly by his last name only, La Vieuville (note the initial capital letter); the same applies for Gérard de La Martinière, who would be called La Martinière. Similarly, Philippe de Villiers talks about the votes he receives as le vote Villiers. However, this usage is now losing ground to a more egalitarian treatment of surnames; it is, for instance, commonplace to hear people talking of de Villiers.

Note that American English language medial capital spellings such as DeVilliers are never used in France.

=== Changes of names ===
A French woman retains her birth name when she marries. In some cases, a woman may take her husband's name as a "usage name". This is not a legal obligation (it is a contra legem custom, as French law since the Revolution has required that no one may be called by any other name than that written on their birth certificate), and not all women decide to do so. However, if they do, they may retain the use of this name, depending on circumstances, even after a divorce. In some cases, the wife, or both spouses, choose to adopt a double-barreled, hyphenated surname made from joining the surnames of both partners. Thus, both partners' surnames coexist with whatever usage name they choose.

This distinction is important because many official documents use the person's birth or legal surname, rather than their usage name.

People may also choose to use other names in daily usage, as long as they are not impersonating others and as long as their usage name is socially accepted. One example of this is the custom of actors or singers to use a stage name. However, identity documents and other official documents will bear only the "real name" of the person.

In some cases, people change their real name to their stage name; for example, the singer Patrick Bruel changed his name from his birth name of Benguigui. Another example of aliases being turned into true names: During World War II, some Resistance fighters (such as Lucie Aubrac) and Jews fleeing persecution adopted aliases. Some kept the alias as a legal name after the war or added it to their name (Jacques Chaban-Delmas' name was Delmas, and Chaban was the last of his wartime aliases; his children were given the family surname Delmas).

Legally changing one's last name, as opposed to adopting a usage name, is quite complex. Such changes have to be made official by a décret en Conseil d'État issued by the Prime Minister after approval by the Council of State. Requests for such changes must be justified by some legitimate interest, for instance, changing from a foreign name difficult to pronounce in French to a simpler name, or changing from a name with unfavorable connotations.

== See also ==
- Dutch name
- French honorifics
- German name
- Germanic name
- List of common French given names at the French Wikipedia (in French)
