= Dominion Park =

Theme Park in Montreal

Coordinates: 45°34′38″N 73°30′54″W

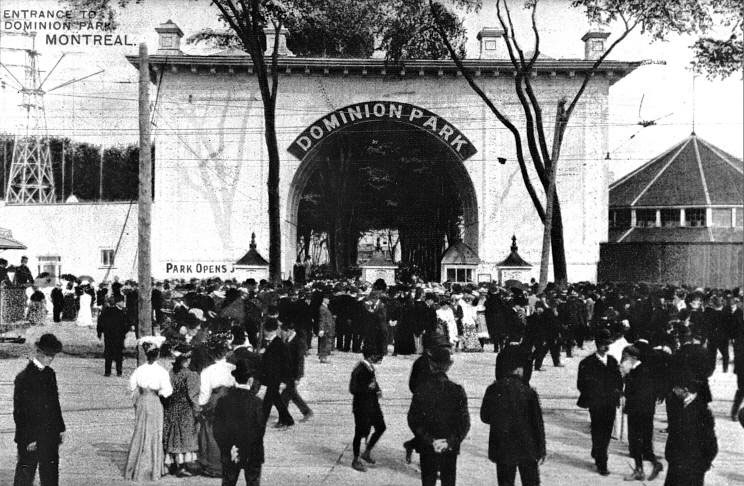
Entrance to Dominion Park, 1910

Dominion Park was an amusement park in Montreal, Quebec, Canada, situated between Notre-Dame Street (near Haig Avenue) and the Saint Lawrence River in the early twentieth century. The park opened on June 2, 1906 and was shuttered in 1937, surviving two fires, in 1913 and 1919. It was owned by the Montreal Suburban Tramway and Power company.

== See also ==
- Belmont Park, Montreal
