= Charles Fortin =

French painter

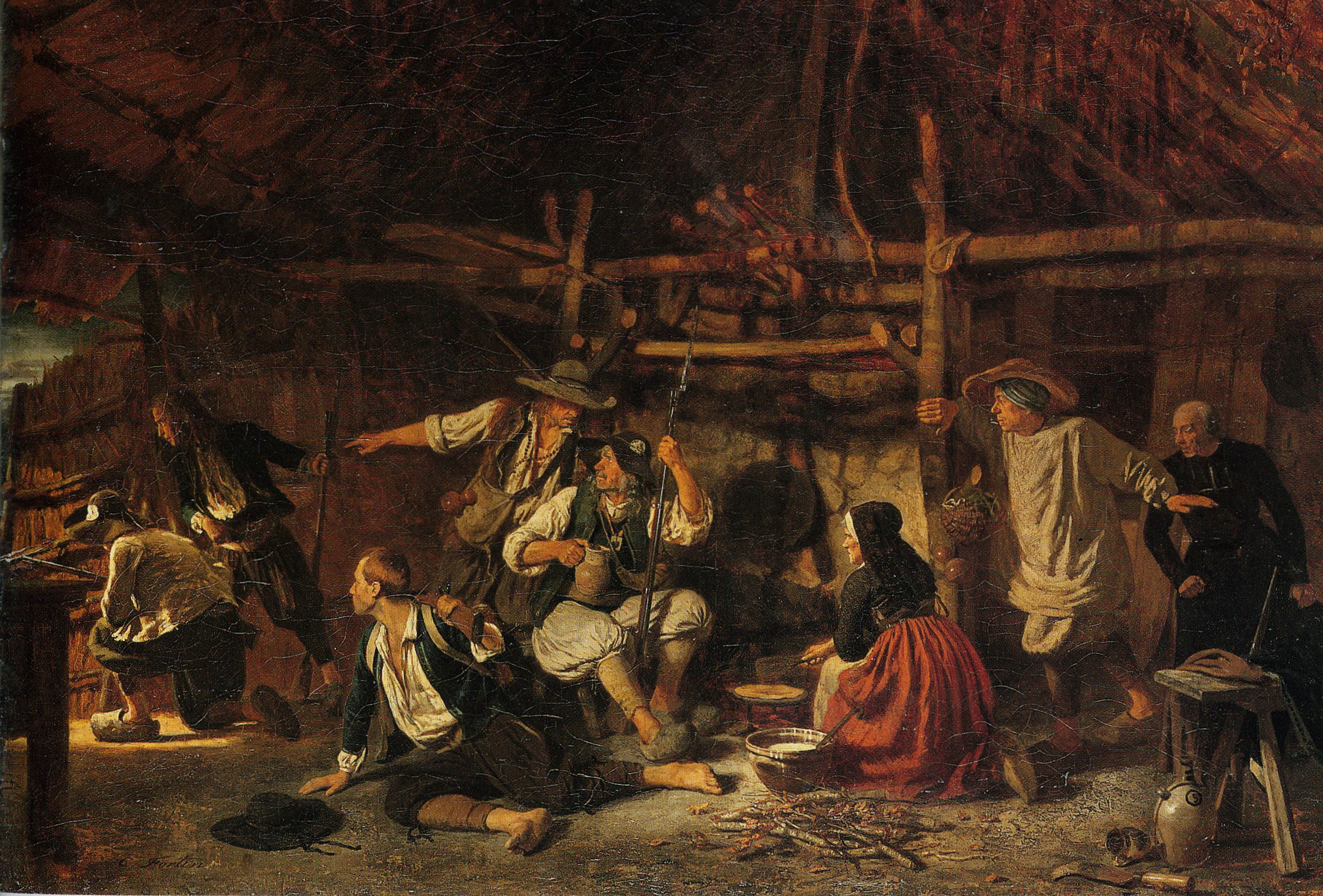
Chouans, 1853, now in the Palais des Beaux-Arts de Lille

Charles Fortin (Paris in 1815 – Paris in 1865) was a French genre and landscape painter.

== Biography ==
Fortin, born in Paris in 1815, was the son of Augustin Félix Fortin. He studied under Beaume and Roqueplan, and first exhibited in 1835. He died in Paris in 1865.

== Works ==
Amongst his works are:

- The Rag-seller.
- The Return to the Cottage.
- The Chimney Corner.
- The Butcher's Shop.
- The Village Barber.
- Chouans. 1853. (Lille Museum.)
- The Blessing. (Luxembourg Gallery.)
- The Music Lesson.
- The Smoker. 1855.
- During Vespers, Morbihan. (Paris Exhibition, 1855.)
- Rustic Interior. 1859.
- The Country Tailor. 1861.
- Between two Halts. 1864.
