= Notre-Dame Street =

Street in Montreal, Quebec

Coordinates: 45°30′21″N 73°33′22″W

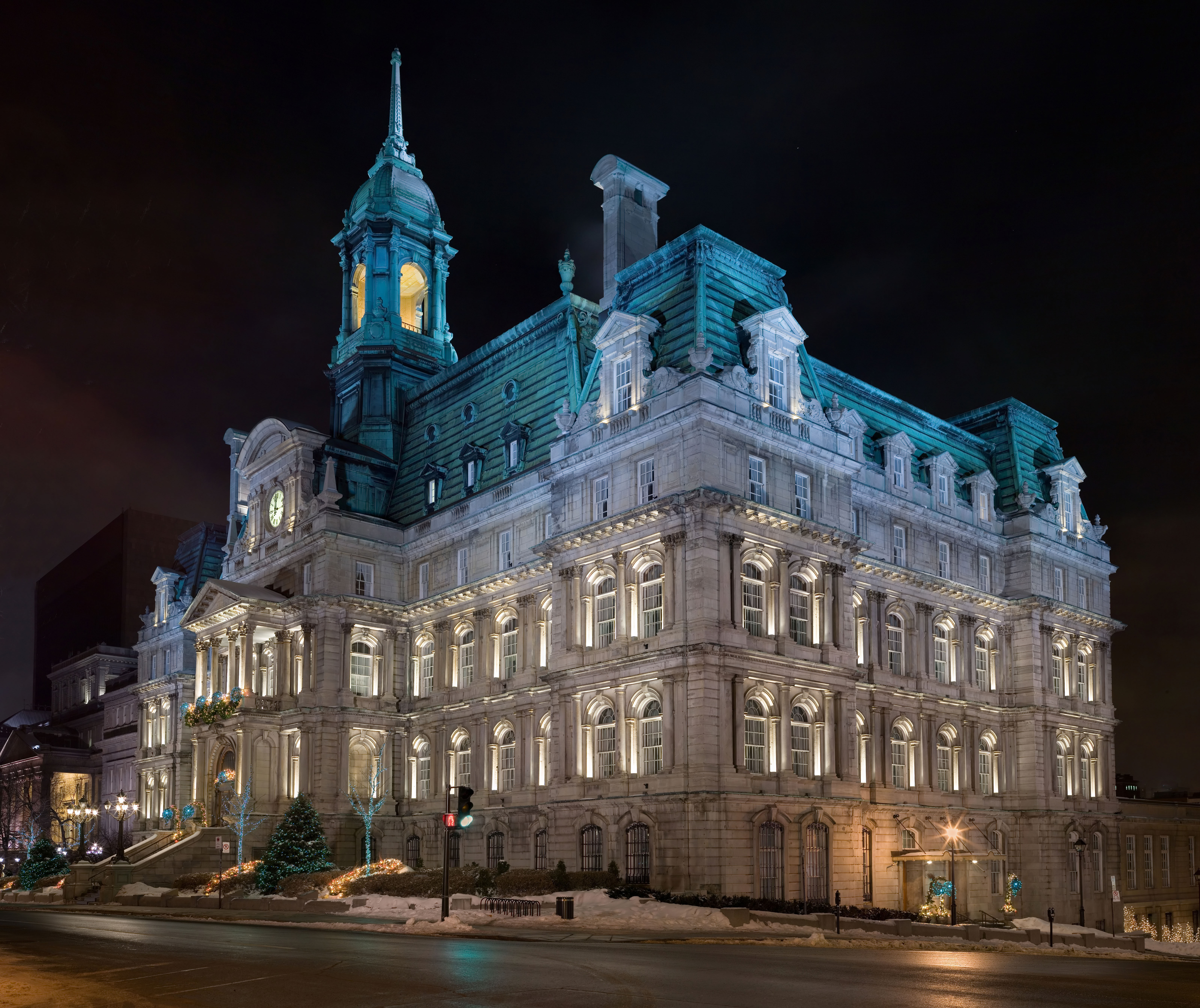
- Montreal City Hall on Rue Notre-Dame in January 2006
- Native name: rue Notre-Dame (French)
- Part of: R-138 east of Sherbrooke Street
- Location: Montreal and Lanaudière
- West end: 34e Avenue, Lachine
- Major junctions: A-25 (TCH) Autoroute L.-H. La Fontaine; R-134 Jacques-Cartier Bridge; A-20 as service lane R-112 Peel Street; R-136 Ville-Marie Boulevard; R-343 Montée de Saint-Sulpice; R-131 Rue Saint-Antoine (Lavaltrie); R-158 Rue Principale
- East end: Rue de Bienville, Berthierville

Construction
- Inauguration: 1672

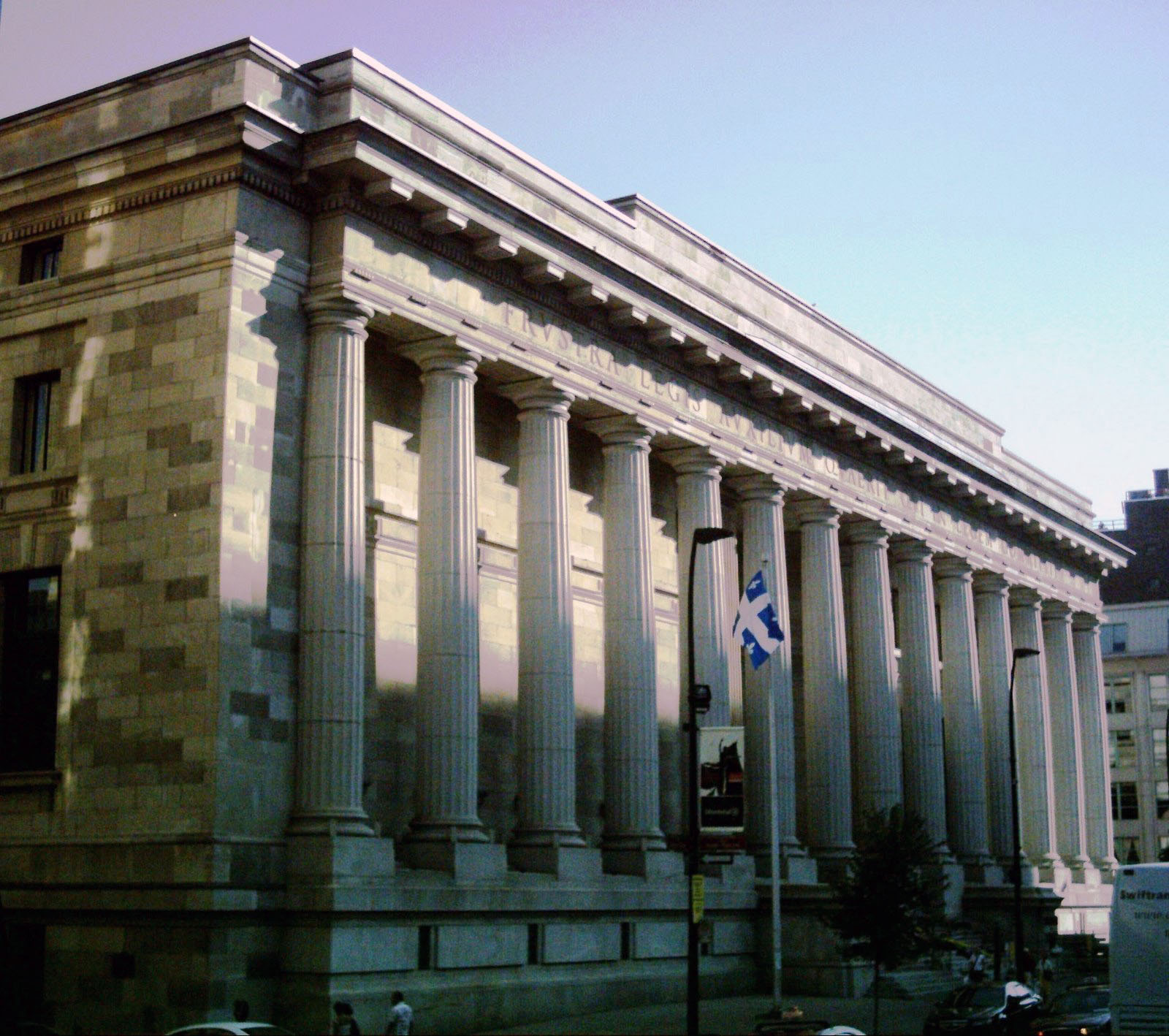
Édifice Ernest-Cormier, the Quebec Court of Appeal building on Notre-Dame in Old Montreal.

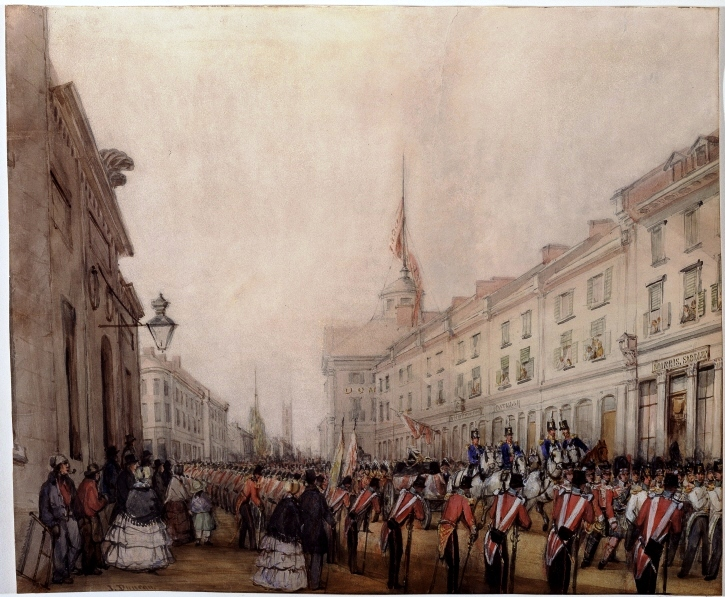
Funeral of General Sir Benjamin d'Urban on the Rue Notre-Dame, 1849. By James Duncan

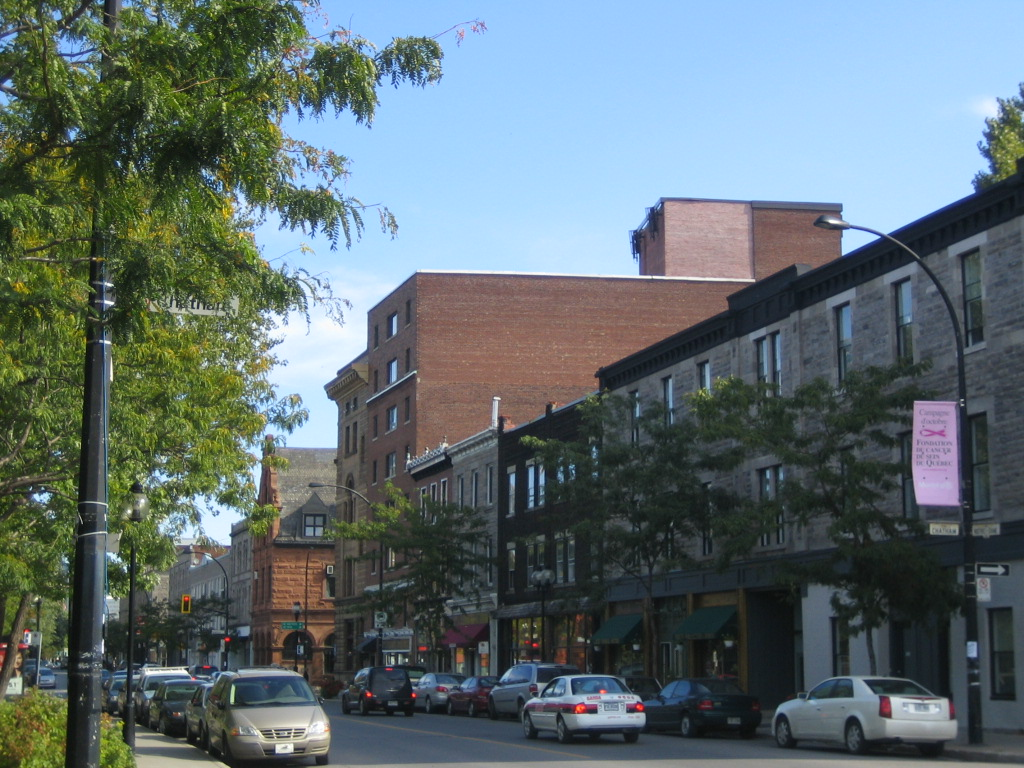
Antique dealers located on Notre-Dame in Little Burgundy

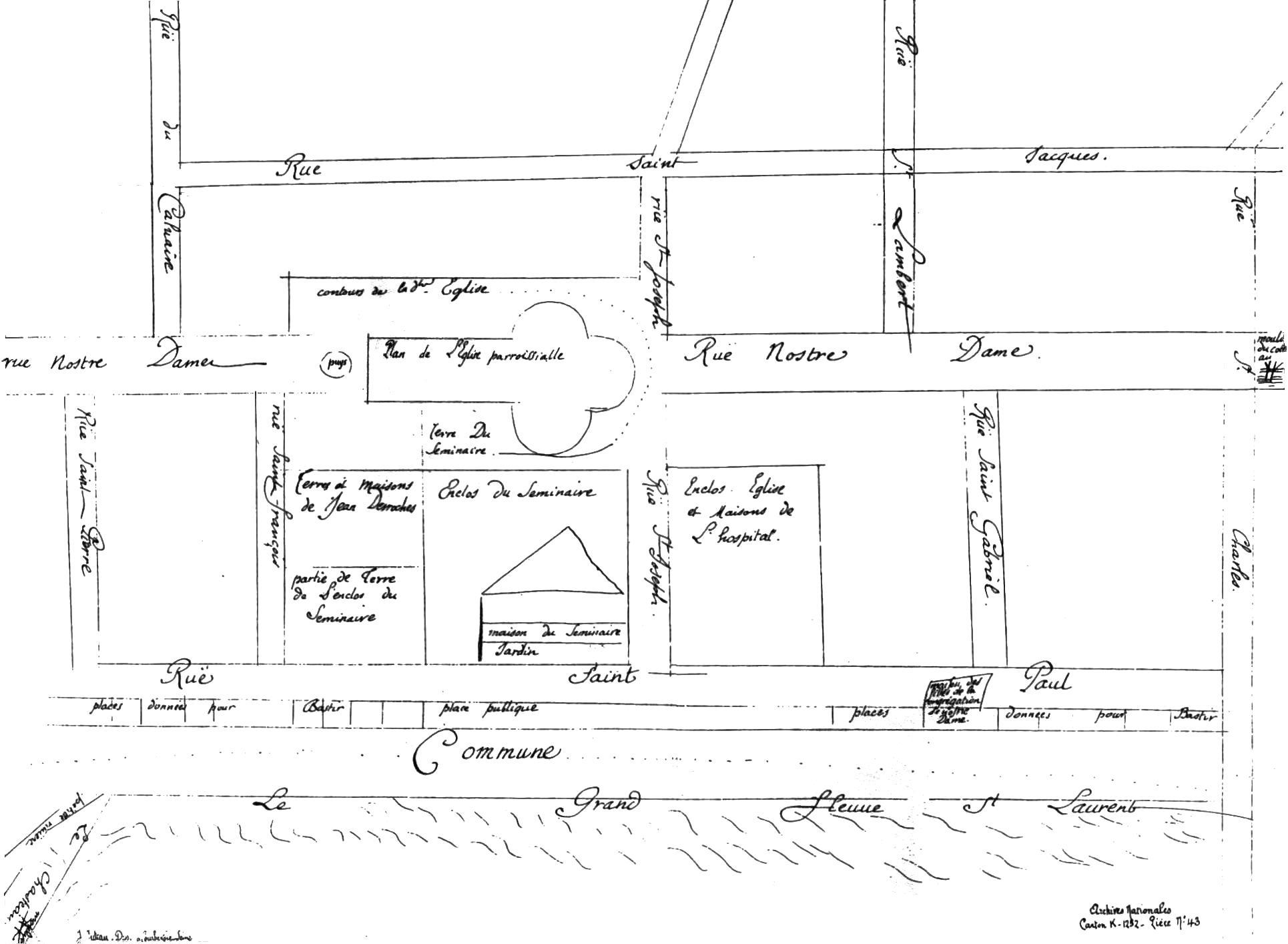
Montreal map drawn by François Dollier de Casson in 1672

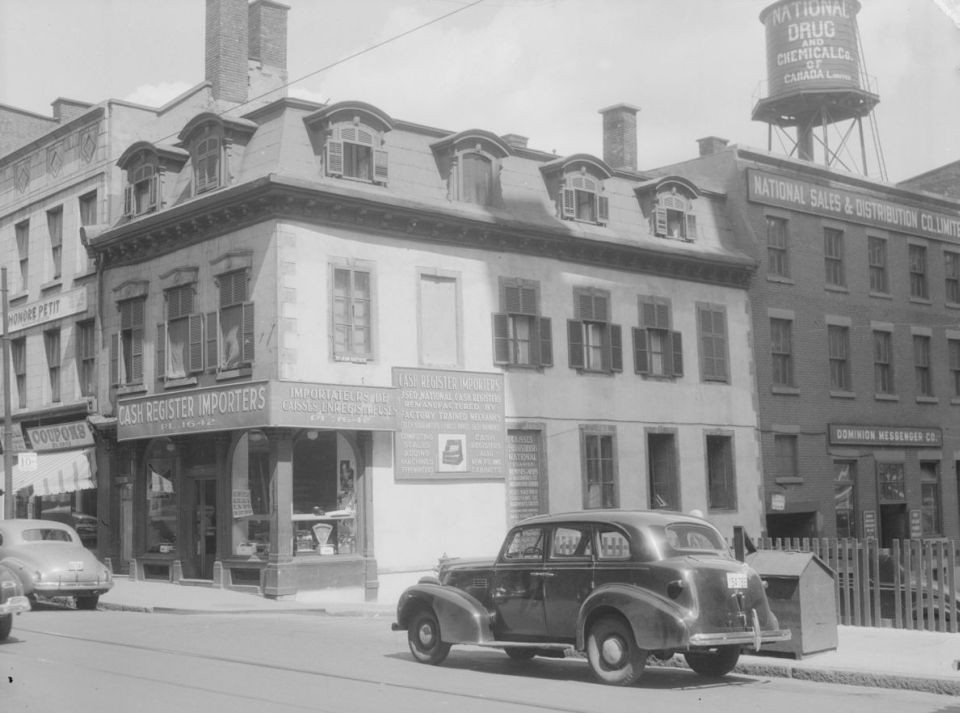
Notre-Dame Street East in 1943

Notre-Dame Street (officially in French: Rue Notre-Dame) is a historic east–west street located in Montreal, Quebec, Canada. It runs parallel to the Saint Lawrence River, from Lachine to the eastern tip of the island in Pointe-aux-Trembles, then continuing off the island into the Lanaudière region.

One of the oldest streets in Montreal, Notre-Dame was created in 1672. The gardens of Château Vaudreuil, which had served as the official residence in Montreal of the Governors General of New France from 1723, fronted Notre-Dame. The street's extension in 1821 led to the demolition of Montreal's Citadel. The Bingham house, which became Donegana's Hotel, was also located on Notre-Dame. In the early 1900s, it was the site of the former Dominion Park.

== Old Montreal and beyond ==
In Old Montreal, it is the site of such key structures as Montreal City Hall, Palais de Justice de Montréal, the Quebec Court of Appeal, the Château Ramezay, Notre-Dame Basilica and the Saint-Sulpice Seminary and the Sir George-Étienne Cartier National Historic Site.

Further west, the street is home to the École de technologie supérieure and runs through Montreal's Little Burgundy neighbourhood, historically the home to the English-speaking black community. Joe Beef Restaurant is located on Notre-Dame Street in Little Burgundy.

== Funeral of General d'Urban, 1849 ==
The funeral of Lt.-General Sir Benjamin d'Urban passed down Rue Notre Dame in 1849 and was captured in a painting by James Duncan. The funeral was instrumental in allaying bitter feelings and in preventing clashes between troops and the populace following the Burning of the Parliament Buildings in Montreal on April 25, 1849. In her book British Regulars in Montreal, Elinor Senior describes the cortege as follows: "All shops were closed from half-past ten in the morning until one o'clock. Sir James Edward Alexander estimated that 10,000 lined the street as minute guns sounded from Saint Helen's Island to mark the movement of the cortege to the military burying ground on Victoria Road (now Rue Papineau)". The spire of Christ Church can be seen on the left, together with one of the towers of Notre-Dame Basilica in the background. The building with the cupola and pennant at half-mast, in the middleground on the right, is Donegana's Hotel, which was situated at the corner of Notre-Dame and Bonsecours streets. It was destroyed by fire only a few months after the procession, on August 16, 1849.

== Planned expressway ==
There were plans to turn the eastern portion of Notre-Dame street into an expressway. It was originally envisioned that autoroute 20 and the Ville-Marie expressway (until 2021 known as autoroute 720) now Route 136 were to extended all the way to the Lafontaine Tunnel as a divided 6 lane highway. Work commenced on the third section of the Autoroute 720 in 1970, subsequent to the completion of the first two sections. This involved demolishing 1200 homes and businesses in order to create a 9 km right-of-way to link up with Autoroute 25. However, rising costs and a change in government never allowed the Ville-Marie expressway to extended beyond its terminus at Rene-Levesque boulevard. At the intersection of Av. Souligny and Rue Dickson, Av. Souligny serves as a brief highway spur that would have been a continuation of Autoroute 720 (if it had been fully completed), using the same kilometer markers. It provides access to Autoroute 25 via exits 15N and 15S.

== Chemin du Roy ==
Notre-Dame Street continues off of the Island of Montreal, heading northeast towards Quebec City, and is known as the Chemin du Roy (Route 138). The name Rue Notre-Dame is used as far east as Lavaltrie; beyond here, Route 138 becomes Grande Côte Ouest in Saint-Damien.
