= Palais de justice (Montreal) =

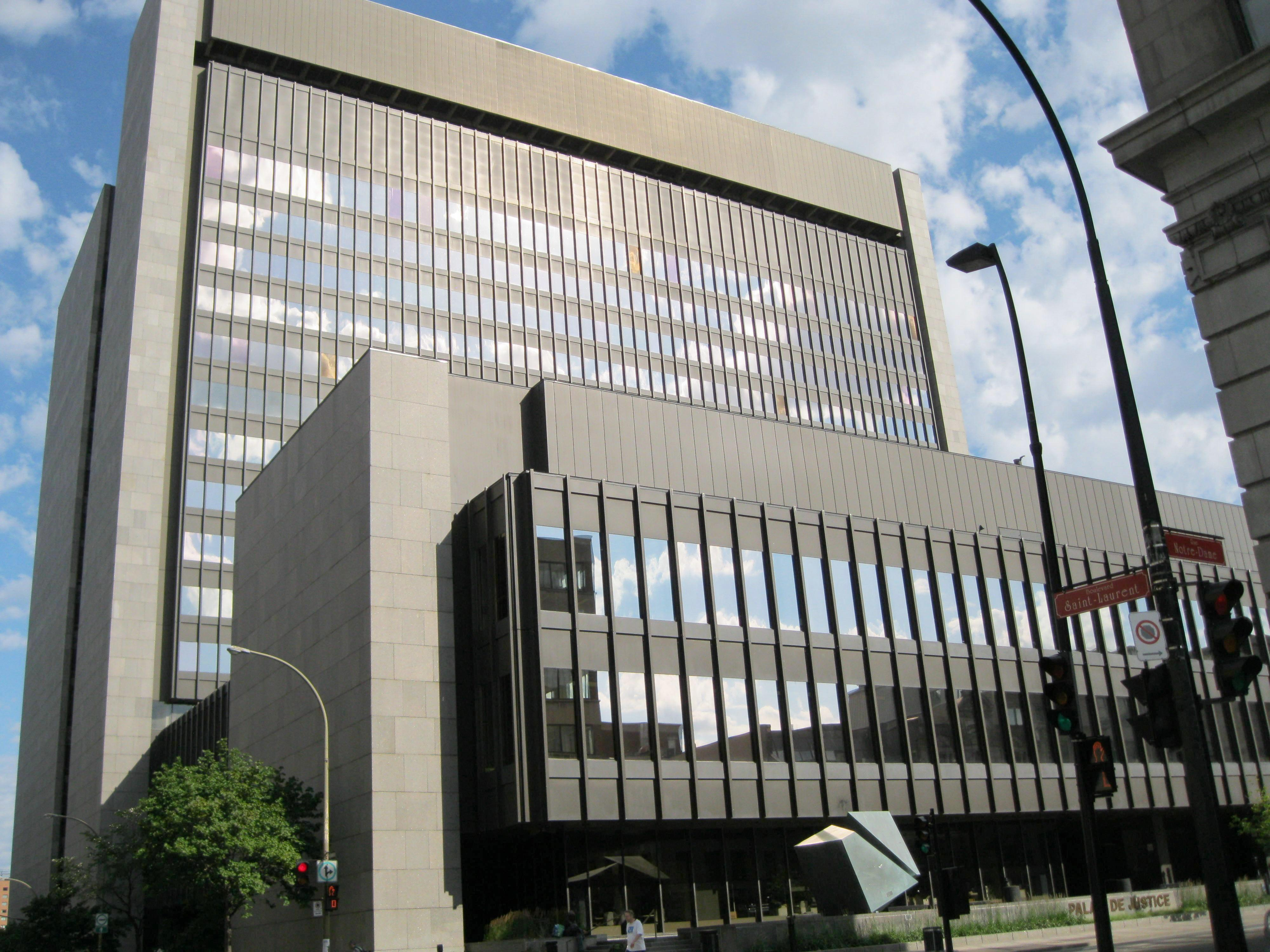
- View from rue Notre-Dame
- Interactive map of the Palais de justice area

General information
- Type: Courthouse
- Architectural style: International style, Modernism
- Location: 1, rue Notre-Dame Est; Montreal, Quebec; H2Y 1B6
- Coordinates: 45°30′26″N 73°33′19″W
- Current tenants: Court of Quebec, Quebec Superior Court
- Construction started: 1965
- Completed: 1971
- Owner: Government of Quebec

Height
- Height: 73.92 m (242.5 ft)

Technical details
- Floor count: 18
- Lifts/elevators: 26

Design and construction
- Architect: David et Boulva

The Palais de justice is a courthouse in Montreal, Quebec, Canada. It is located at 1, rue Notre-Dame Est in the Old Montreal neighbourhood of the Ville-Marie borough. It was completed in 1971.

Though located in the Old Montreal historic district, it is an international style structure, featuring the outdoor sculpture Allegrocube. The black metal and granite building is adjacent to the Champ de Mars square. It was designed by Montreal architects Pierre Boulva and Jacques David, whose other prominent Montreal projects included 500 Place D'Armes, Théâtre Maisonneuve, the Dow Planetarium and the Place-des-Arts, Atwater and Lucien-L'Allier metro stations.

== Allegrocube ==
Created by Charles Daudelin in 1973, Allegrocube is a cube-shaped abstract sculpture outside the Palais, 2.4 m in height, made of bronze.

== Older courthouses ==
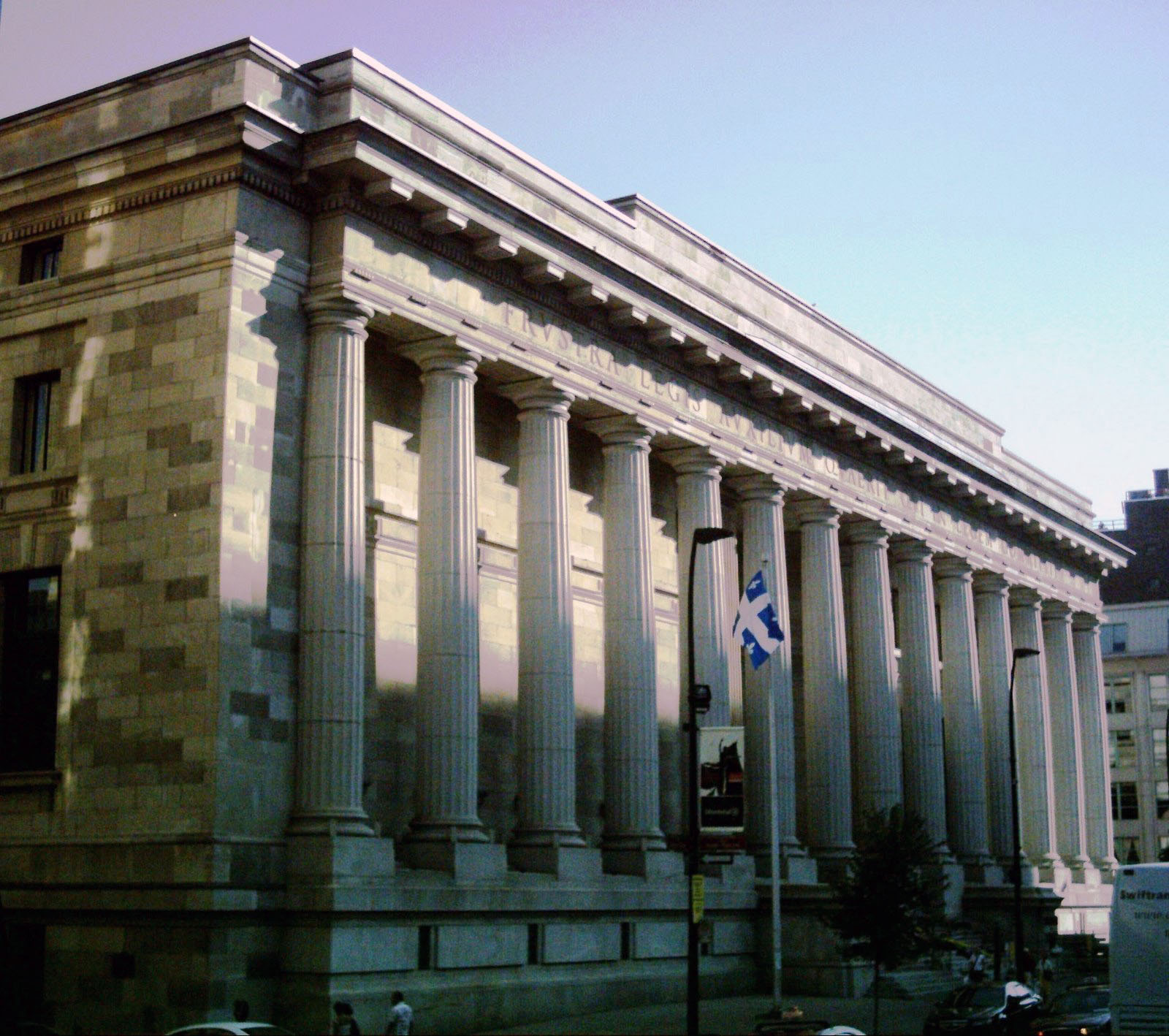
Ernest Cormier Building

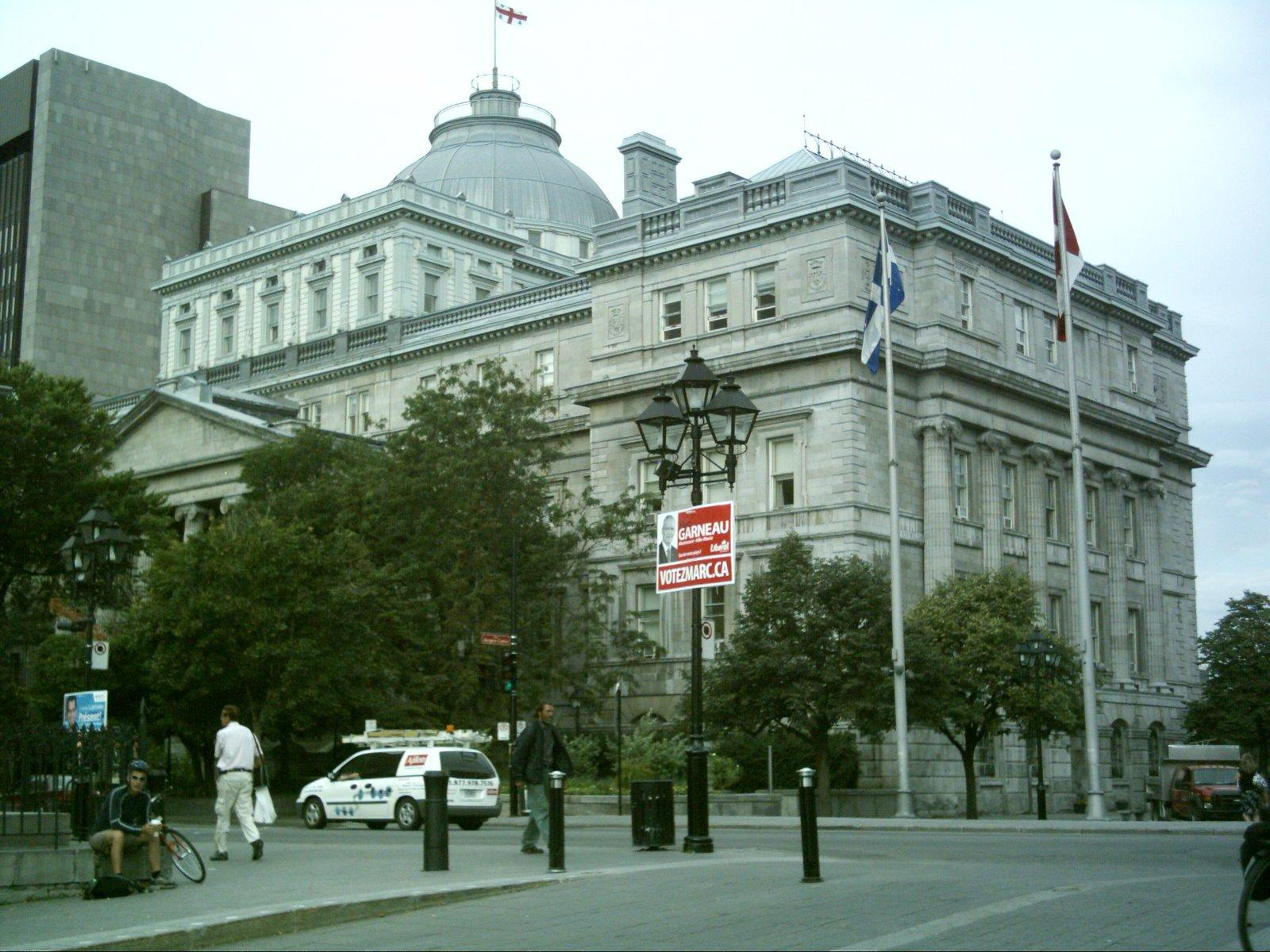
Édifice Lucien-Saulnier

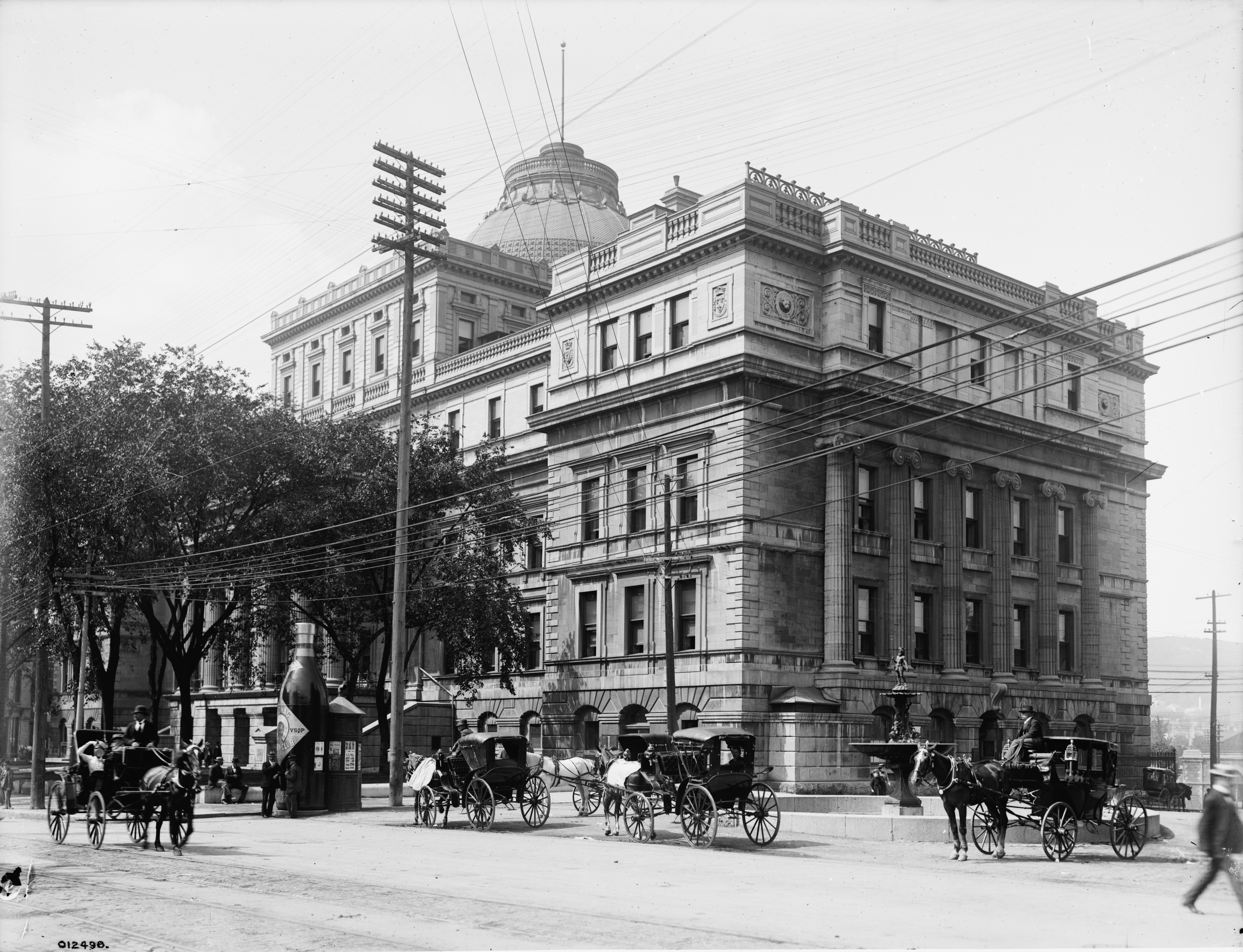
Édifice Lucien-Saulnier, 1901

The current Palais de justice de Montréal is the third building on Notre-Dame Street in Old Montreal to bear that name. The first was the Old Montreal Courthouse, now known as the municipal Édifice Lucien-Saulnier, designed by John Ostell (as well as Frederick Preston Rubidge) and inaugurated in 1856. Construction on the second, now known as the Édifice Ernest-Cormier and home to the Quebec Court of Appeal, began in 1922.

== See also ==
- Old Montreal
