= Édifice Ernest-Cormier =

Courthouse in Quebec, Canada

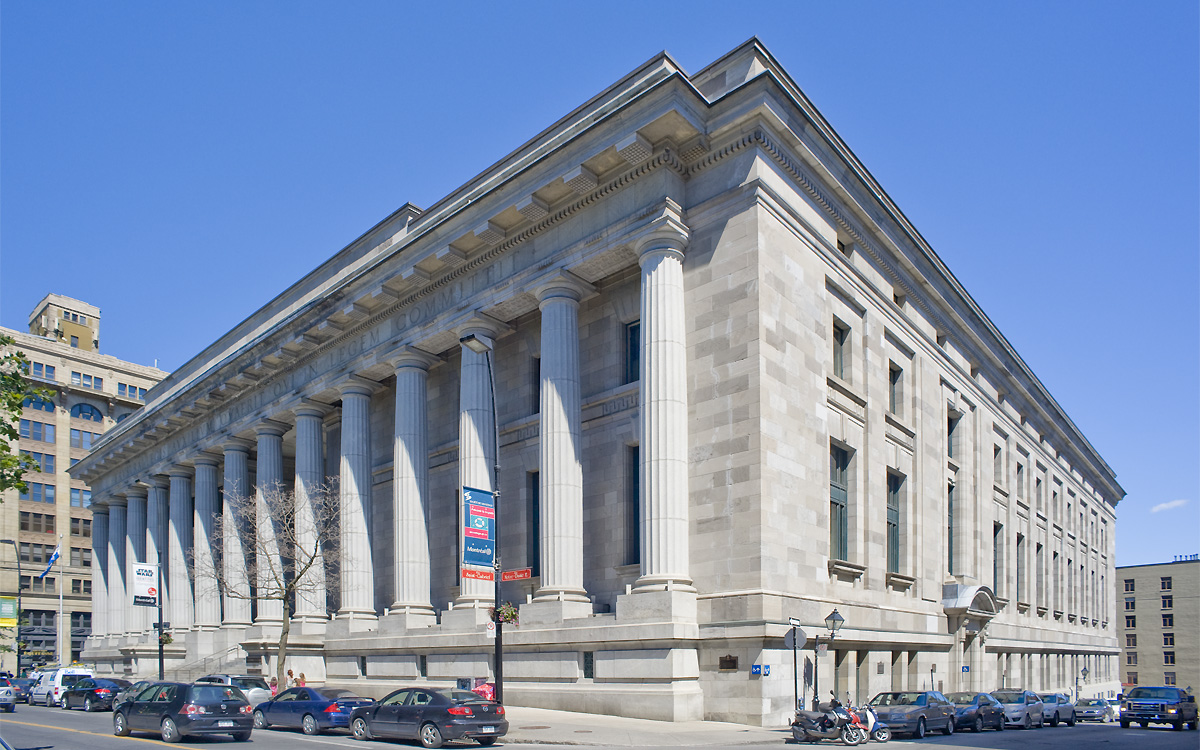

- Location within Montreal

General information
- Architectural style: Neoclassical
- Location: Old Montreal, 100, rue Notre-Dame Est, Montreal, Quebec, Canada
- Coordinates: 45°30′25.7″N 73°33′15.22″W
- Current tenants: Quebec Court of Appeal
- Groundbreaking: 1921
- Construction started: 1922
- Inaugurated: November 22, 1926
- Renovated: 2004
- Owner: Government of Quebec

Technical details
- Floor count: 4

Design and construction
- Architects: Louis-Auguste Amos, Charles Jewett Saxe and Ernest Cormier

Renovating team
- Architect: EVOQ Architecture
- Renovating firm: Lemay & Associés

Édifice Ernest-Cormier was the second courthouse in Montreal to bear the name Palais de justice de Montréal. It was built between 1922 and 1926, and designed by architects Louis-Auguste Amos, Charles Jewett Saxe and Ernest Cormier. It was the first major commission for Cormier after his return to Montreal from his studies in Paris. After Cormier's death in 1980, the building was renamed in his honour. It currently houses the Quebec Court of Appeal.

It is located at 100, rue Notre-Dame Est, across the street from both the first Palais de justice de Montréal, Édifice Lucien-Saulnier, and the current courthouse.
