= Félix Lecomte =

French sculptor (1737–1817)

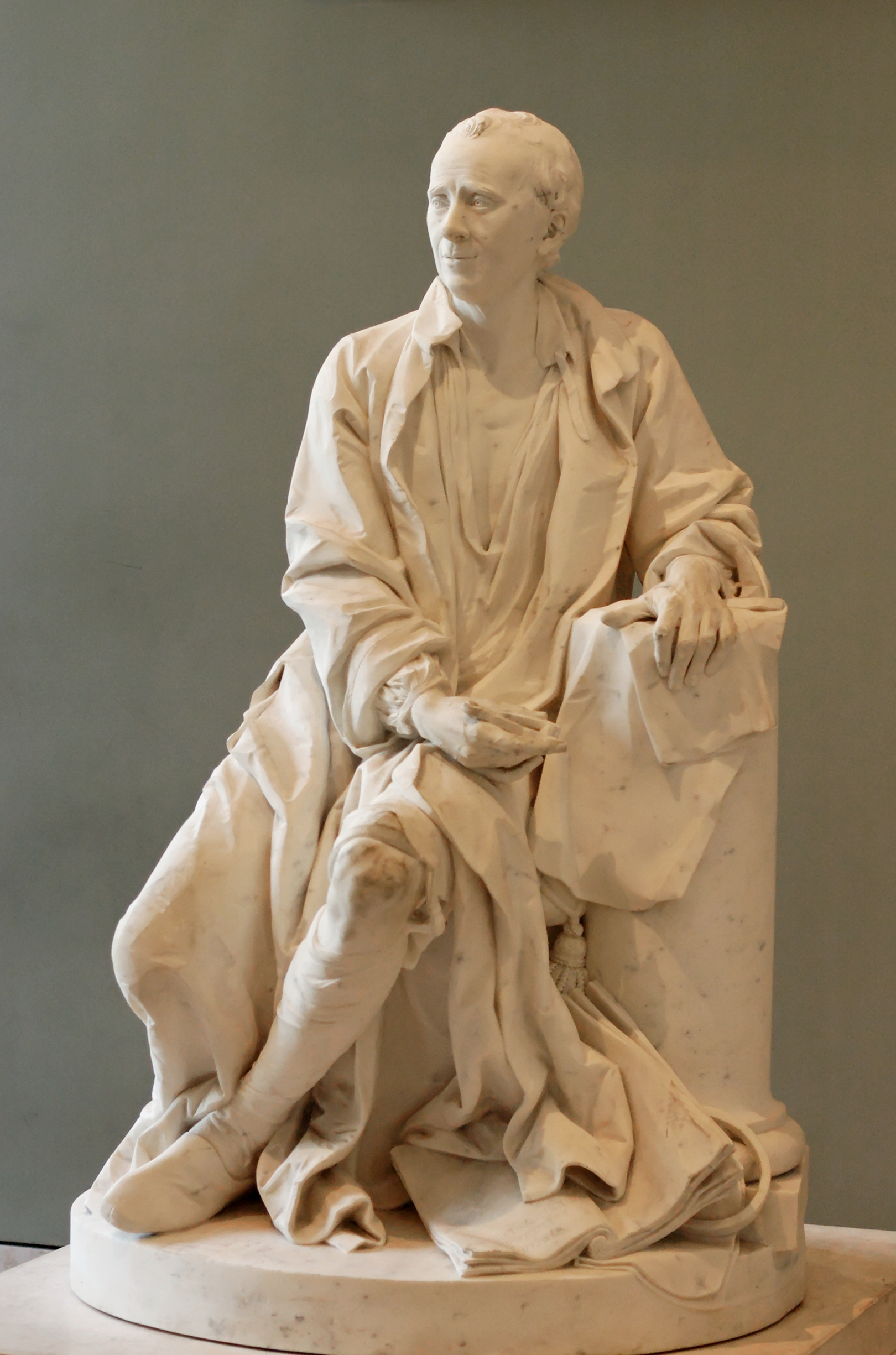
Statue of Jean le Rond d'Alembert, completed in 1789, now in the Louvre

Félix Lecomte (1737, Paris – 1817, Paris) was a French sculptor in the second half of the eighteenth century.

In 1758 he won the Prix de Rome scholarship in sculpture and attended class in Rome from 1761 to 1768. When he returned to Paris, he was accepted by the Academy thanks especially to his group sculpture in marble Œdipe et Phorbas (Oedipus and Phorbas). He was elected to the French Academy in 1771.

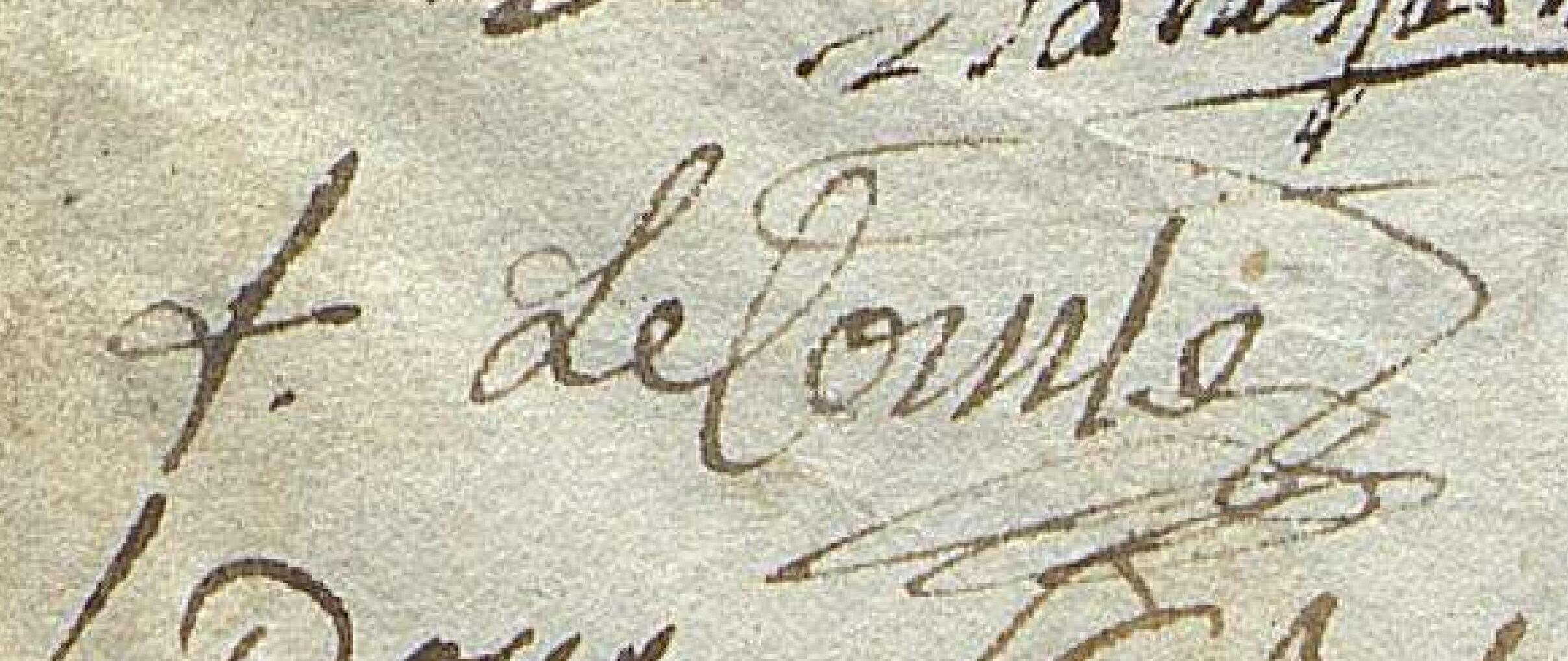
