= Robert-Émile Fortin =

Canadian artist (1945-2004)

- Born: December 19, 1945; Hull, Quebec
- Died: July 8, 2004 (aged 58); Laurentides
- Occupation: Painter

Robert-Émile Fortin (December 19, 1945 – July 8, 2004) was a Quebec painter.

He was born in Hull, Quebec, the son of Émile Fortin and Aline Boisvert. His mother died before he was two years old and Fortin was raised at the Sainte-Thérèse Orphanage in Aylmer, Quebec and the Saint-Joseph Orphanage in Ottawa. Fortin spent his summers at the farm of his grandmother Aldéa located near Lac Leamy. After he completed primary school at the age of twelve, he attended secondary school in Sainte-Rose-de-Lima (now part of Gatineau) and Gatineau, living at first with his grandmother but later in foster homes.

Fortin worked at a number of jobs: as a cleaner and bartender at a bar and at a paper mill, before securing a job as a graphic artist with the federal Department of Energy, Mines and Resources. In 1968, he married Monique Lemieux. Later that year, he entered the Arts faculty at the University of Ottawa. In 1970, he returned to work with the federal Department of the Environment (formerly part of Energy, Mines and Resources). In 1973, he held his first exhibition of paintings in Hull with L'Amicale Artistique de l'Outaouais. In 1974, he enrolled in night courses with the Ottawa School of Art. Facing a conflict between his growing interest in drawing and painting and his career as a civil servant, Fortin resigned after he was offered a promotion to department head in 1974.

His work, originally non-figurative, gradually evolved into a naïve folk art style. During this period, Fortin moved to a farm in Mulgrave Derry, Quebec. The wood stove of the farm house there became an important element in his future work. He taught art courses in the Ottawa region from 1979 to 1981. In 1983, he embarked on a tour of Europe where he studied art and sold his art to galleries and private collectors.

On his return to Canada, Fortin began to produce limited edition silkscreen prints of his works. In 1984, he moved from his farm to the town of Buckingham. In the following year, he opened a gallery nearby. Later that year, he travelled to Zaire where he gave courses in silkscreening. In 1988, Fortin returned to acrylic paintings on canvas and left Buckingham, establishing himself in downtown Hull.

In 1997, he moved to a studio and gallery in the Mont-Tremblant area.

Fortin died in the Laurentians at the age of 58.
