= Augustin Félix Fortin =

French painter (1763–1832)

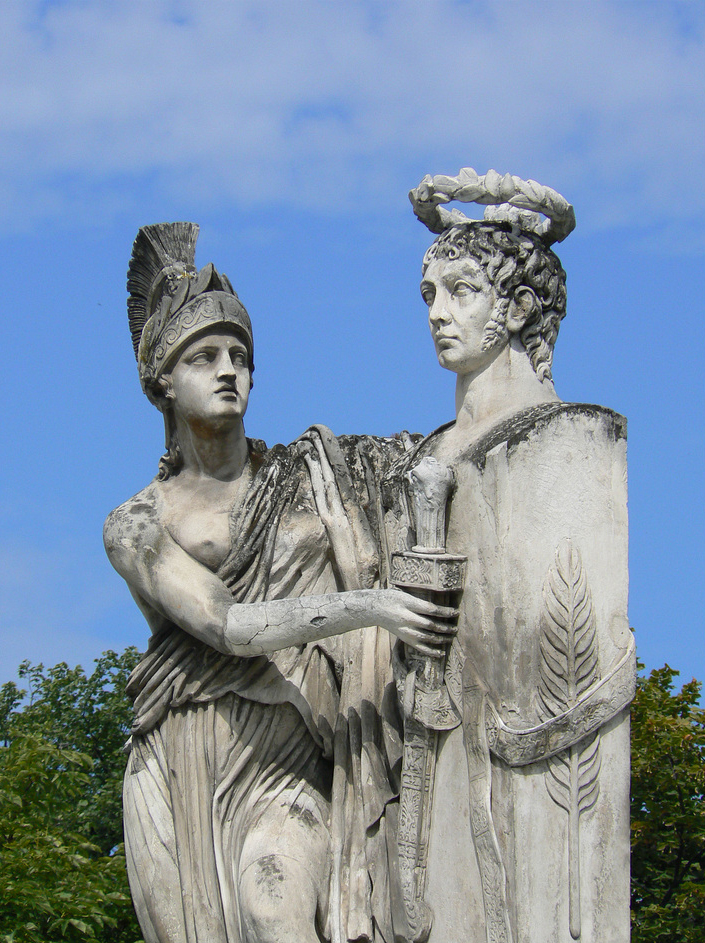
Sculptures of the Fontaine Desaix, ca. 1802, originally in the Place Dauphine, now relocated to Riom

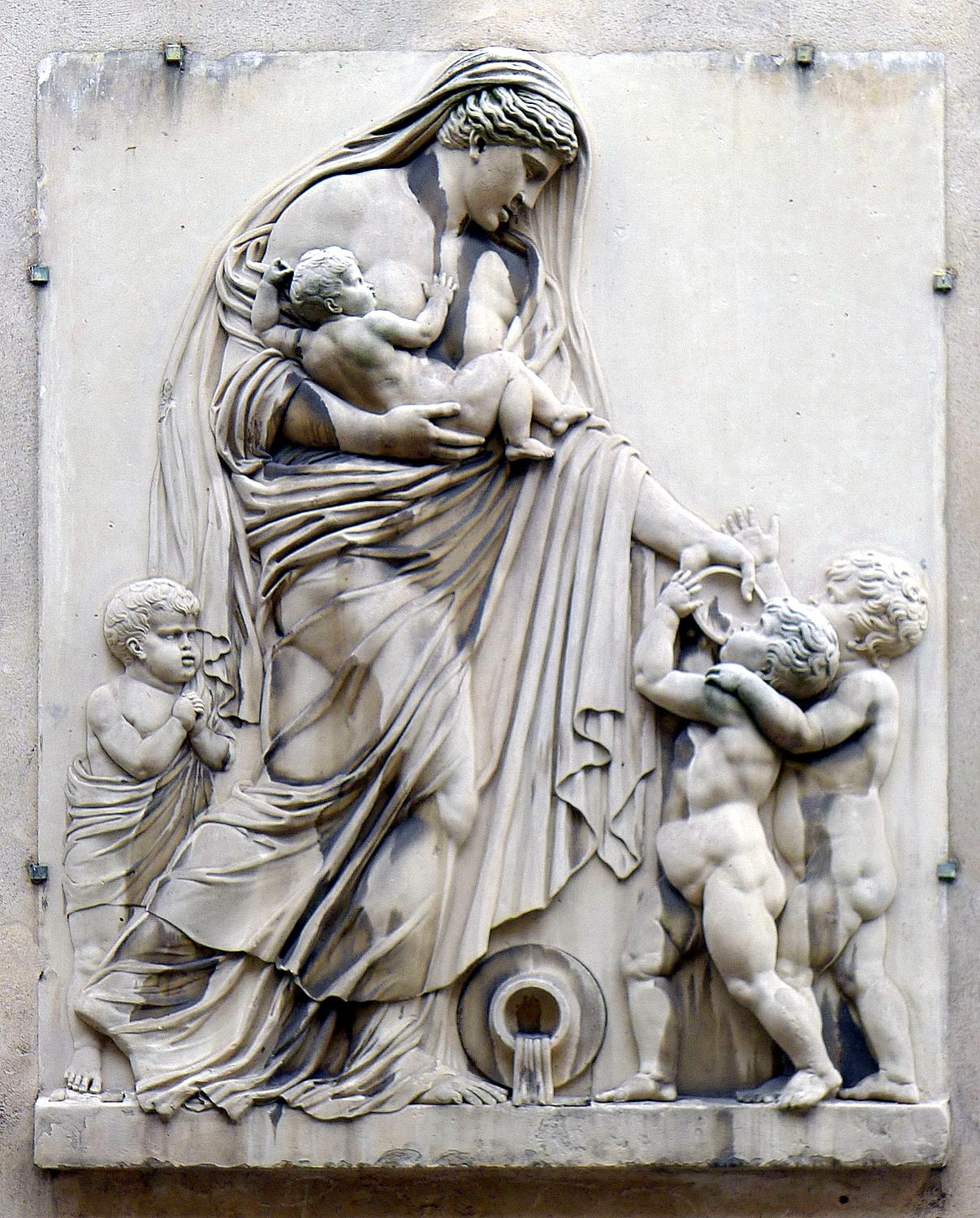
Charity, bas relief at 46-48 rue de Sévigné - Paris

Augustin Félix Fortin (1763–1832), a French painter of landscapes, and of genre and historical subjects, was born in Paris in 1763, and studied under his uncle, the sculptor Félix Lecomte. He was, however, chiefly noted for his sculpture, for which he obtained the Prix de Rome in 1783. He became a member of the Académie royale de peinture et de sculpture in 1789, and died in Paris in 1832.

Among his paintings are:

- Invocation to Nature.
- A Satyr.
- Lesbia.

Examples of sculptures:

- Sculptured memorial wall plaque in Carrara marble commemorating the passing in 1808, in Malta, of Louis Charles, Count of Beaujolais, and brother of future King of France Louis Philippe I. Completed in 1819 and located in the Chapel of France in St. John's Co-Cathedral, Valletta, Malta, to mark the place where the count is buried.
