= Anne Fortin =

Anne Fortin (born 1957) is an American/Canadian accounting academic and Professor of Accounting at the Université du Québec à Montréal. She is known for her study on "Users' participation in the accounting standard-setting process."

Fortin received her Ph.D. from the University of Illinois at Urbana-Champaign in 1983. She is an active researcher on accounting theory. Her areas of research include issues related to ethics and social responsibility of accounting; the development of generic competencies for accounting students; and professional judgment.

== Selected publications ==
Articles, a selection:

- Fortin, Anne. "The 1947 French Accounting Plan: Origins and Influences on Subsequent Practice." The Accounting Historians Journal (1991): 1-25.
- Durocher, Sylvain, Anne Fortin, and Louise Côté. "Users' participation in the accounting standard-setting process: a theory-building study." Accounting, Organizations and Society 32.1 (2007): 29–59.
- Fortin, Anne, and Michele Legault. "Development of generic competencies: Impact of a mixed teaching approach on students' perceptions." Accounting Education: an international journal 19.1-2 (2010): 93–122.
