= Dan Fortin =

Canadian businessman

Dan Fortin is general manager of IBM Canada Ltd., and thus is responsible for strategic and day-to-day operations of IBM in Canada. Named to his current position in January 2005, Fortin leads 20,000 staff.

Fortin joined IBM in 1978 and has held several marketing and management positions overseeing divisions in Canada, the United States and Latin America.

Fortin is a native of Quebec. He graduated in 1978 with a Bachelor of Civil Engineering degree from Carleton University in Ottawa.
