= Isabelle Hénault =

Canadian psychologist

Isabelle Hénault, is a psychologist from the University of Québec at Montréal, Canada.

Hénault has developed a Relationship and Sex Education Program. She is presently collaborating on numerous international research initiatives involving socio-sexual education and interpersonal relationships. She is the author of Asperger's Syndrome and Sexuality: From Adolescence through Adulthood.

== Books ==
- Isabelle Hénault (2006). Le syndrome d'Asperger et la sexualité. Jessica Kingsley Pub. ISBN 2-7650-0935-X.
