= List of National Historic Sites of Canada in Montreal =

This is a list of National Historic Sites (French: Lieux historiques nationaux) in Montreal, Quebec and surrounding municipalities on the Island of Montreal.

As of 2018, there are 61 National Historic Sites in this region, of which four (Lachine Canal, Louis-Joseph Papineau, Sir George-Étienne Cartier and The Fur Trade at Lachine National Historic Site) are administered by Parks Canada (identified below by the beaver icon ). The site of the village of Hochelaga was designated in 1920, and was the first site designated in Montreal.

Numerous National Historic Events also occurred in Montreal, and are identified at places associated with them, using the same style of federal plaque which marks National Historic Sites. Several National Historic Persons are commemorated throughout the city in the same way. The markers do not indicate which designation—a Site, Event, or Person—a subject has been given.

National Historic Sites located elsewhere in Quebec are at List of National Historic Sites in Quebec, except for Quebec City, which are listed under National Historic Sites in Quebec City.

This list uses names designated by the national Historic Sites and Monuments Board, which may differ from other names for these sites.

== National Historic Sites ==
Media related to National Historic Sites in Montreal at Wikimedia Commons

Site	Date(s)	Designated	Location	Description	Image
Atwater Library of the Mechanics' Institute of Montreal	1920 (completed)	2005	Westmount; 45°29′19.17″N 73°35′3.41″W	The home of the first Mechanics' Institute in Canada (established 1828), and the oldest subscription library in Canada; the last Mechanics' Institute building in Canada serving its original purposes	View of a relief on the Mechanics' Institute building
Bank of Montreal	1894 (completed)	1990	Montreal; 45°29′15.81″N 73°34′7.45″W	A 3 1/2-storey sandstone former bank branch; the building is a rare surviving example of a commercial building in Canada in the Queen Anne Revival style	View of the Bank of Montreal National Historic Site of Canada
Battle of Rivière des Prairies / Battle of Coulée Grou	1690 (battle)	1924	Montreal; 45°41′56.07″N 73°30′13.68″W	The site of a battle between a group of Iroquois and a group of French settlers in 1690	The Coulée Grou battle site
Battle of the Lake of Two Mountains	1689 (battle)	1925	Senneville; 45°26′52.69″N 73°56′25.41″W	A skirmish at Lake of Two Mountains between 28 coureurs de bois and a group of 22 Iroquois; the Iroquois defeat restored confidence among the French settlers in the area that had been shaken by the Lachine massacre	Monument of the Battle of the Lake of Two Mountains
Black Watch (Royal Highland Regiment) of Canada Armoury	1906 (completed)	2008	Montreal; 45°30′28.37″N 73°34′11.38″W	Home to The Black Watch (Royal Highland Regiment) of Canada, one of Canada's oldest regiments and its oldest surviving Highland Regiment; a testament to the important roles played by armouries in Canada's military history	View of the entrance to the Black Watch Armoury in Montreal
Bonsecours Market	1847 (completed)	1984	Montreal; 45°30′32.21″N 73°33′5.18″W	A monumental, domed masonry civic building that occupies a full city block, originally built to house the city's first city hall, a public market, exhibition rooms and a concert hall; it was the largest town hall built in Canada during the mid-19th-century and reflected Montreal's rise as a metropolis	View of the Bonsecours Market
Château De Ramezay / India House	1705 (completed), 1756 (rebuilt after fire)	1949	Montreal; 45°30′31.54″N 73°33′11.28″W	A stone mansion built for Claude de Ramezay, Governor of Montreal; it played an important role in the political and commercial life of New France and of Lower Canada for two centuries, housing the Compagnie des Indes occidentales starting in the 1740s and serving as official residence of the Governors-in-Chief of British North America commencing in the 1770s	View of Château Ramezay
Christ Church Cathedral	1860 (completed)	1999	Montreal; 45°30′13.21″N 73°34′12.04″W	An excellent example of a Gothic Revival-style cathedral; associated with the historic growth and development of Montreal through its congregation, whose members included many of the city's leading industrialists and businessmen	View of the interior of Christ Church Cathedral
Church of Notre-Dame-de-la-Défense	1919 (completed)	2002	Montreal; 45°32′5.82″N 73°36′41.28″W	A Romanesque Revival style church in Montreal's Little Italy, specifically designed for an Italian Canadian parish; closely associated with Canada's oldest Italian community, established in Montreal in the 1860s	View of the front facade of the Church of the Madonna della Difesa
Church of Saint-Léon-de-Westmount	1903 (completed)	1997	Westmount; 45°29′7.58″N 73°35′30.75″W	One of the best examples of mural decoration dating from a period when the use of murals was prevalent in Canada; one of the few known examples in the country of a work executed in the buon fresco technique, and the best example of a comprehensive interior decor done by Guido Nincheri	View of the Saint-Léon de Westmount Church interiors
Ernest Cormier House	1930-31 (built)	2018	Montreal; 45°30′01″N 73°35′07″W	Eclectic house designed by Ernest Cormier for himself; later the residence of retired Prime Minister Pierre Trudeau	View of the exterior of Cormier House
Erskine and American United Church	1894 (completed)	1998	Montreal; 45°29′56.98″N 73°34′47.4″W	An excellent example of a large Romanesque Revival church known for its unusual fenestration patterns and attractive stonework; the windows by Louis Comfort Tiffany represent the most extensive collection of Tiffany's religious stained glass windows in Canada	View of the front facade of Erskine and American United Church
Former Montreal Custom House	1838 (completed)	1997	Montreal; 45°30′11.98″N 73°33′16.5″W	An excellent example of Palladian architecture in Canada, designed by John Ostell, and one of the last Canadian public buildings to use the Palladian style; its construction marked the end of Montreal's lesser importance in comparison with Quebec City	View of the Former Montreal Custom House
George Stephen House / Mount Stephen Club	1881 (completed)	1971	Montreal; 45°29′56.73″N 73°34′32.93″W	A large, stone Victorian mansion that is the best example of a Renaissance Revival house in Canada; the home of George Stephen, 1st Baron Mount Stephen, president of the Bank of Montreal and of the Canadian Pacific Railway in the late 19th century	View of Mount Stephen Club from the street
Grey Nuns' Hospital	1765 (completed)	1973	Montreal; 45°30′1.31″N 73°33′17.2″W	A three-and-a-half building that is an example of early French Canadian architecture and is the one surviving building of the Grey Nuns' Hospital complex; the Sisters of Charity, founded by Marie-Marguerite d'Youville, tended the sick and dispossessed here until 1871, and it is from this building that they extended their ministry across Canada	View of the Grey Nuns' Hospital
H. Vincent Meredith Residence	1897 (completed)	1990	Montreal; 45°30′15.11″N 73°34′54.7″W	Representative of the mansions built by Montreal's elite in the late 19th century in the Golden Square Mile and a noted example of a house in the Queen Anne Revival-style; built for businessman and philanthropist Vincent Meredith and his wife, Lady Meredith, now serving as the McGill Centre for Medicine, Ethics and Law.	View of the Vincent Meredith Residence
Hersey Pavilion	1905 (completed)	1997	Montreal; 45°30′30.94″N 73°34′50.01″W	One of the first purpose-built nurses' residences in Canada, located on the Royal Victoria Hospital campus; symbolic of the history of training and the professionalism of nurses in Canada	Exterior view of the Hersey Pavilion
Hochelaga	1300s (ca.) (first construction of fortified villages in area, as later witnessed by Cartier), 1535 (arrival of Cartier)	1920	Montreal; 45°30′12.83″N 73°34′30.58″W	A grass-covered area about 79 square metres (850 sq ft) in area with a stone marker, located to the left of the main entrance of McGill University; representative of the Iroquois village of Hochelaga that was visited by Jacques Cartier, the first European to reach the future site of Montreal, in 1535	Wood engraving of Hochelaga published in Venice by Giovanni Battista Ramusio, based on the accounts of Jacques Cartier
Lachine Canal	1825 (completed)	1929	Montreal; 45°27′30″N 73°36′42″W	An early 19th-century canal, 14 kilometres (8.7 mi) in length, built to circumvent white water on the St. Lawrence River; the head of a canal network linking the Great Lakes and the interior of the continent to the Atlantic Ocean	View of the Lachine Canal, formerly a commercial route, now used mainly for recreational purposes
Lachine Canal Manufacturing Complex	1825 (completed)	1996	Montreal; 45°27′30″N 73°36′42″W	An important manufacturing and industrial complex, with the number of firms and diversity of its output at its zenith (1880 to 1940) unparalleled elsewhere in Canada; at one time, over 20% of the workforce of the Island of Montreal was employed in the area	View of factories along the Lachine Canal in 1896
Last Post Fund National Field of Honour	1930 (established)	2007	Pointe-Claire; 45°26′38.80″N 73°50′15.58″W	A military cemetery for veterans who died in a hospital or a public establishment after their military service; symbolic of principles such as the equality of soldiers in death and perpetual remembrance	Cross to the memory of Arthur Currie at the National Field of Honour
LeBer-LeMoyne House	1671 (completed)	2002	Montreal; 45°25′48″N 73°39′59″W	A 17th-century fieldstone former fur trading post; the oldest known extant buildings associated with Charles LeMoyne and the fur trade during the French Regime	LeBer-LeMoyne House and associated buildings
Louis-Joseph Papineau	1785 (completed)	1968	Montreal; 45°30′35.77″N 73°33′7.88″W	A 2 1/2-storey stone house that was the Papineau family home in Montreal; associated with the most important period in Papineau's life when he was the leader of the Parti canadien and one of the leading figures in the Lower Canada Rebellion	Exterior view of Papineau House
Maison Cartier	1813 (completed)	1982	Montreal; 45°30′28.56″N 73°33′9.18″W	Two 2 1/2-storey stone attached houses that are typical of pre-industrial construction in Canada; originally constructed for Louis Parthenais and Augustin Perrault	View of Maison Cartier
Maison Saint-Gabriel	1668 (completed)	2007	Montreal; 45°28′33.37″N 73°33′21.58″W	A fieldstone house that was home to the sisters of the Congregation of Notre Dame, who operated a farm for more than 300 years, making it one of the oldest surviving farm properties in Canada; an exceptional example of rural architecture of the French Regime	View of Maison Saint-Gabriel
Marie-Reine-du-Monde Cathedral	1894 (consecrated)	1999	Montreal; 45°29′57.86″N 73°34′7.36″W	A Baroque Revival cathedral that, when built, represented a break from the dominance of the Gothic Revival style in church architecture in Montreal; inspired by St. Peter's Basilica in Rome, it is the most significant symbol of ultramontanism in Canada	View at night of the dome of Mary, Queen of the World Cathedral
Marlborough Apartments	1900 (completed)	1990	Montreal; 45°30′25.07″N 73°34′32.6″W	A four-storey, red brick apartment building that is an excellent example of the start of the 20th century apartment design in Canada; Queen Anne design was a popular style for luxury domestic architecture across Canada in this period, and this is one of the few Queen Anne apartment buildings that has survived in the country	View of the front entrance of the Marlborough Apartments
Masonic Memorial Temple	1930 (completed)	2001	Montreal; 45°29′40.92″N 73°34′58.85″W	A monumental masonic temple resembling a Greek temple, built to honour the Freemasons who served in the First World War; an exceptional example of late Beaux-Arts architecture in Canada	View of the Montreal Masonic Memorial Temple
Merchants Textile Mill	1882 (established)	1989	Montreal; 45°28′32″N 73°34′48″W	The second largest textile mill in Canada for the first four decades of the 20th century	
Model City of Mount Royal	1914 (district plan)	2008	Mount Royal; 45°30′58″N 73°38′35″W	A historic residential suburb developed in accordance with a 1914 district plan by Frederick Todd; a noted synthesis of the City Beautiful, Garden City and Garden Suburb movements, and remarkably homogeneous despite being constructed over the course of six decades	Plan of "Model City" and Mount Royal Tunnel
Monklands / Villa Maria Convent	1804 (completed)	1951	Montreal; 45°28′54.53″N 73°37′1.6″W	A two-storey stone Neo-Palladian mansion that served as the official residence of Governors General of Canada from 1844 to 1849	View of Monklands in 1870
Montreal Botanical Garden	1931 (established)	2008	Montreal; 45°33′26.00″N 73°33′24.50″W	A 75-hectare (190-acre) botanical garden; its collections and facilities rank it as one of the most important botanical gardens in the world	View of the main greenhouse at Montreal Botanical Garden
Montreal City Hall	1878 (completed), 1922 (rebuilt)	1984	Montreal; 45°30′31.84″N 73°33′14.45″W	A five-storey stone building and one of the best examples of the Second Empire style in the country; the first city hall to have been constructed in Canada solely for municipal administration, representing the growing importance of urban areas and municipal services in the late 19th century	View of the main tower and entrance of the Montreal City Hall
Montreal Forum	1924 (completed)	1997	Montreal; 45°29′25″N 73°35′5″W	One of Canada's most famous sporting venues; an icon of Canadian culture due to its association with one of the most successful sporting franchises in North America, the Montreal Canadiens	The Forum in 2012
Montreal's Birthplace	1642 (event)	1924	Montreal; 45°30′12.27″N 73°33′14.31″W	The location where Paul Chomedey de Maisonneuve laid the foundation of Montreal, as Fort Ville-Marie, on May 18, 1642	Fort Ville-Marie in 1645
Monument National	1893 (completed)	1985	Montreal; 45°30′32.76″N 73°33′45″W	A four-storey theatre and cultural centre constructed by the Saint-Jean-Baptiste Society and then known as the "Heart of French America"; now occupied by the National Theatre School of Canada	View of the Monument National building from the street
Mother House of the Grey Nuns of Montreal	1871 (completed)	2011	Montreal; 45°29′37″N 73°34′36″W	The former motherhouse of the Grey Nuns, now part of Concordia University; notable due to the manner in which the site incorporates the architectural trends of its time, and for the social relevance of the work performed by the religious order	An 1890 photo of the chapel spire of the Mother House of the Grey Nuns of Montreal
Mount Royal Cemetery	1852 (established)	1999	Montreal; 45°30′32.76″N 73°33′45″W	A 67-hectare (170-acre) cemetery located on the northern slope of Mount Royal and designed in accordance with the Picturesque principles of the early 19th-century rural cemetery movement; many of the funerary monuments are of exceptional historical, architectural or artistic value, and are reflective of the history of Montreal, Quebec and Canada	View of the cemetery gates circa 1895
Notre-Dame Roman Catholic Church / Basilica	1829 (completed)	1989	Montreal; 45°30′16.15″N 73°33′22.55″W	An immense stone church built in the Romantic Gothic Revival style, it was upon completion the largest church in either Canada or the U.S. for half a century; the first significant example of the Gothic Revival style in Canada, with many of Quebec's most celebrated architects and artisans helping complete the decoration of the church in the 19th and 20th centuries	View of the front facade of Notre-Dame
Notre-Dame-des-Neiges Cemetery	1854 (established)	1999	Montreal; 45°30′6.55″N 73°36′23.48″W	The largest cemetery in Canada and an outstanding cultural landscape; the historical significance of many of the persons buried in the cemetery commemorates many aspects of the history of Montreal, Quebec and Canada	View of the front gates of Notre-Dame-des-Neiges Cemetery
Outremont Theatre	1929 (completed)	1993	Montreal; 45°31′11.77″N 73°36′30.94″W	A cinema with an Art Deco exterior and a combined Art Deco and atmospheric interior; a noted example of the type of deluxe cinemas erected in new suburban neighbourhoods across Canada during the 1920s	View of the Outremont Theatre and surrounding streetscape
Pavillon Mailloux	1931 (completed)	1997	Montreal; 45°31′31.54″N 73°33′51.26″W	A five-storey brick nurses' residence on the campus of Montreal's Notre-Dame Hospital; construction of this purpose-built residence in 1931 symbolized the growing professionalism of nursing and the expanding role of women in health care	View of front entrance of Pavillon Mailloux
Rialto Theatre	1924 (completed)	1993	Montreal; 45°31′24.91″N 73°36′17.14″W	A movie palace and an exceptional example of Beaux-Arts architecture in Canada	View of the front facade of the Rialto Theatre
Roger Gaudry Building	1928-1943 (built)	2018	Montreal; 45°30′06.8″N 73°36′53.6″W	Eclectic monumental building and tower by Ernest Cormier at the University of Montreal remains a landmark, symbol of inter-war Quebec's support for academic pursuits	Roger Gaudry Building under construction, 1941
Sainte-Anne-de-Bellevue Canal	1843 (completed)	1929	Sainte-Anne-de-Bellevue; 45°24′13″N 73°57′16″W	A canal constructed by the Board of Works of the Province of Canada to by-pass the Ste. Anne's Rapids in the east channel of the Ottawa River; commemorates the important role played by such waterways during the 19th and 20th centuries	Canal and boardwalk in Sainte-Anne-de-Bellevue
Saint Joseph's Oratory of Mount Royal	1904 (established), 1967 (basilica completed)	2003	Montreal; 45°29′30″N 73°37′0″W	A large Roman Catholic pilgrimage site located on the north slope of Mount Royal, dominated by a landmark domed basilica; conceived by André Bessette, it has developed into a national and international religious and tourist destination	View of the Saint Joseph's Oratory basilica
Saint-Sulpice Seminary and its Gardens	1687 (completed)	1980	Montreal; 45°30′14″N 73°33′25″W	A religious seminary with garden; a rare and remarkable example of French Regime classicism known also for the historical integrity of its convent garden	View of the Saint-Sulpice Seminary main entrance
Senneville Historic District	1860 (established)	2002	Senneville; 45°25′50.1″N 73°57′8.2″W	A 565-hectare (1,400-acre) historic district that evolved from a late-19th-century resort village which comprised the country estates of wealthy Montrealers; representative of the development of Picturesque landscape design and Arts and Crafts architecture from 1865 to 1930	The Morgan Arboretum in the Senneville Historic District
Sir George-Étienne Cartier	1838 (completed)	1964	Montreal; 45°30′40.12″N 73°33′5.84″W	Two houses that together served as the residence of Sir George-Étienne Cartier, a Father of Confederation; representative of an upper-middle class Montreal home of the mid 19th century	View of the Sir George-Étienne Cartier National Historic Site houses
St. George Antiochian Orthodox Church	1940 (completed)	1999	Montreal; 45°32′23.5″N 73°36′51.07″W	A predominantly Byzantine-style church, it is the earliest-known, purpose-built church of the Syrian Orthodox community in Canada that continues to fulfil its original role; an important symbol of the history and traditions of this community in Canada	Interior of St. George Antiochian Orthodox Church
St. George's Anglican Church	1870 (completed)	1990	Montreal; 45°32′23.5″N 73°36′51.07″W	An Anglican church in downtown Montreal that is an excellent example of the High Victorian phase of the Gothic Revival style	Exterior view of St. George's Anglican Church
St. James United Church	1888 (completed)	1996	Montreal; 45°30′18.97″N 73°34′6.56″W	A large stone church in the High Victorian Gothic Revival style, closely associated with the late phase of Methodism in Canada; best known example in the country of an amphitheatre plan for the nave and transept and a Sunday school influenced by the Akron plan in the chancel	Exterior view of St. James United Church
St. Patrick's Basilica	1847 (completed)	1990	Montreal; 45°30′12.82″N 73°33′53.31″W	A noted example of French Gothic Revival architecture in the country; built to serve one of the largest early influxes of Irish immigrants to what is now Canada, the heart of the Irish population of Montreal, and the location of the funeral of Thomas D'Arcy McGee in 1868	Exterior view of St. Patrick's Basilica
Sulpician Towers / Fort de la Montagne	1694 (completed)	1970	Montreal; 45°29′37.68″N 73°35′4.56″W	Two 13-metre (43 ft) towers that were once bastions of a fort built by François Vachon de Belmont for the Sulpicians of a nearby mission; once housed the school and nuns of Marguerite Bourgeoys	Exterior view of one of the Sulpician Towers
The Fur Trade at Lachine	1803 (completed)	1970	Montreal; 45°25′53.04″N 73°40′32.16″W	A single-storey stone warehouse located in an attractive park-like setting on the banks of the Lachine Canal; originally built by the North West Company, the warehouse symbolizes the history of the fur trade in Montreal	The Fur Trade at Lachine warehouse and original Lachine Canal
The Main		1996	Montreal; 45°30′36.58″N 73°33′51.93″W	A 6-kilometre (3.7 mi) long stretch of Saint Laurent Boulevard where consecutive waves of immigrants settled; the merging and mixing of cultures created a character that inspired novelists, poets, singers, and film-makers	Saint Laurent and Saint Catherine Streets in Montreal in 1905
Trafalgar Lodge	1848 (completed)	1990	Westmount; 45°29′42.36″N 73°35′53.39″W	An asymmetrical 1 1/2-storey brick villa; a rare example of a Gothic Revival villa in Quebec	
Van Horne / Shaughnessy House	1848 (completed)	1973	Montreal; 45°29′42.36″N 73°35′53.39″W	The Second Empire-style mansion of Thomas Shaughnessy, 1st Baron Shaughnessy, now forming part of the Canadian Centre for Architecture	Exterior view of Van Horne / Shaughnessy House
Westmount District	1874 (city incorporated)	2012	Westmount	The historic district of Westmount which epitomizes the architectural styles and trends in landscape architecture of 1890 to 1930; reflects the efforts of local citizens who, from the early 20th century onwards, sought to protect the diversity and historic integrity of the district's built environment	Westmount City Hall
Wilson Chambers	1868 (completed)	1990	Montreal; 45°30′3.25″N 73°33′35.06″W	A four-and-a-half-storey stone Gothic Revival style commercial building with Italianate and Second Empire influences; while many churches and institutional buildings were erected in this style in the 19th century, Gothic Revival commercial buildings were rare and this is one of the few remaining examples in Canada	Exterior view of Wilson Chambers
Windsor Station (Canadian Pacific)	1889 (completed)	1975	Montreal; 45°29′50.86″N 73°34′7.18″W	A railway terminal and Canadian Pacific Railway head office originally designed by Bruce Price; one of the earliest major buildings in Canada to use the Richardsonian Romanesque Revival style	Exterior view of Windsor Station

== See also ==
- List of historic places in Montreal
- History of Montreal
- Architecture of Montreal
