= Octobre (band) =

Canadian musical group

- Origin: Quebec City, Quebec, Canada
- Genres: Progressive rock, progressive pop, jazz-rock, chanson
- Years active: 1971–1982
- Labels: Option, Return to Analog, Les Disques Zodiaque, Disques Total, Trans-World, CBS, Kébec-Disc
- Past members: Jean Dorais; Pierre Flynn; Pierre Hébert; Mario Légaré; Richard Pelletier; Gérard Leduc

Octobre was a Québécois progressive rock group active from 1971 to 1982.

== History ==
Pierre Flynn, Mario Légaré and Jean Dorais met Pierre Hébert in October 1971 and founded the group Octobre. They launched their first album in March 1973. The song "La maudite machine" from this album was highly successful.

Octobre gave shows at the National Arts Centre, and at the Capitole de Québec with King Crimson. They also had a benefit concert at the Centre Paul-Sauvé for Québec-Presse. After a successful tour, they gave shows in 1974 at the Outremont Theatre and at the Évêché of the Hôtel Nelson. They published two albums in 1974 and 1975.

In June 1976, Octobre performed in the show OK nous v'là! with Beau Dommage, Contraction, Harmonium, Richard Séguin and Raoul Duguay to an audience of 400 000 at Mont-Royal, for Saint-Jean-Baptiste Day. In 1977, they published the album "L'autoroute des rêves", which is considered the "apotheosis" of Pierre Flynn as a composer and performer. Octobre toured in 1978, and performed at the Théâtre Saint-Denis in March.

In 1979, Pierre Hébert was replaced by Richard Pelletier and the saxophonist Gérard Leduc joined the group. The group's last album, Clandestin, was published in 1980. After the album failed commercially, the group ceased most of its activities in 1981. A few shows were given in late 1982.

There was a reunion show on 7 July 1989 at the Théâtre Saint-Denis for the Montreal International Jazz Festival and a reunion benefit show in 2017.

== Style ==
Octobre songs have a jazzy progressive rock style similar to Chicago and other similar anglophone bands. Their lyrics contain criticisms of social inequalities and of dehumanization in society. These dark themes did not appeal to a broader audience.

== Discography ==
Singles
Year	Title
1973	Viens vivre/Si on partait
1973	La maudite machine/Dans ma ville
1975	Quand la nuit se réveille/Il est déjà tard
1976	Tu t’en vas encore ce soir/Baptême de l’air
1977	La prochaine décennie/Le vent se lève
1980	Clandestins/Le bout de la ligne

Albums
Year	Title
1972	Octobre
1974	Les nouvelles terres
1975	Survivance
1977	L'autoroute des rêves
1978	Chants dans la nuit
1978	Le meilleur d'Octobre SV.P.
1980	Clandestin
