= List of historic places in Montreal =

This article is a list of historic places in Montreal, entered on the Canadian Register of Historic Places, whether they are federal, provincial, or municipal. All addresses are the administrative Region 06. For all other listings in the province of Quebec, see List of historic places in Quebec.

== List of historic places ==
| Name | Address | Coordinates | Government recognition (CRHP №) | Wikidata ID | Image |
|---|---|---|---|---|---|
| Ancien hôtel de ville | 13 Avenue Strathyre; Montreal QC | 45°25′34″N 73°39′34″W | Montreal municipality (16295) | | |
| Last Post Fund National Field of Honour National Historic Site of Canada | 703 Donegani Road; Pointe-Claire QC | 45°29′16″N 73°48′35″W | Federal (16591) | | |
| National Film Board | 3155, Cote-de-Liesse Road; Saint-Laurent QC | 45°30′57″N 73°39′34″W | Federal (9555) | | More images |
| Saint Anne's Hospital-Administration Building | 55 Senneville Road; Senneville QC | 45°25′N 73°58′W | Federal (2012) | | |
| Machine Shop | Le Sud-Ouest QC | 45°29′17″N 73°33′07″W | Federal (4478) | | More images |
| Battle of the Lake of Two Mountains National Historic Site of Canada | north of Senneville Boulevard; Senneville QC | 45°26′52″N 73°56′24″W | Federal (15608) | | More images |
| William D. Stroud Row Houses | 1419-1441, Pierce Street; Ville-Marie QC | 45°29′41″N 73°34′45″W | Quebec (4842) | | More images |
| Hudson's Bay Warehouse | 1251-55 Saint-Joseph Blvd. Lachine QC | 45°25′53″N 73°40′32″W | Federal (10462) | | |
| Postal Station H | 1420 St. Catherine Street West; Ville-Marie QC | 45°29′47″N 73°34′35″W | Federal (10863) | | More images |
| Light Tower (Front) | Parc St. Louis; Lachine QC | 45°25′56″N 73°41′42″W | Federal (10878) | | More images |
| Light Tower (Rear) | Lachine QC | 45°26′41″N 73°38′15″W | Federal (10877) | | More images |
| HMCS Donnacona | 2055 Drummond Street; Ville-Marie QC | 45°30′00″N 73°34′35″W | Federal (11058) | | |
| Armoury | 4171 Esplanade Avenue; Le Plateau-Mont-Royal QC | 45°30′59″N 73°34′58″W | Federal (11090) | | More images |
| Armoury | 4185 Chemin de la Cote des Neiges; Montreal QC | 45°29′43″N 73°36′08″W | Federal (11266) | | More images |
| Armoury | 3721 Henri Julien Street; Montreal QC | 45°31′04″N 73°34′21″W | Federal (11273) | | More images |
| Clock Tower | Ville-Marie QC | 45°30′44″N 73°32′45″W | Federal (11098) | | More images |
| Warehouse and Office | Mill Street; Le Sud-Ouest QC | 45°29′25″N 73°33′05″W | Federal (11262) | | More images |
| Elevator 5, Annex | Ville-Marie QC | 45°29′46″N 73°33′02″W | Federal (11291) | | |
| Cathcart Armoury | 691 Cathcart Street; Ville-Marie QC | 45°30′09″N 73°34′10″W | Federal (11406) | | More images |
| Louis-Joseph Papineau National Historic Site of Canada | 440 Bonsecours Street; Ville-Marie QC | 45°30′36″N 73°33′06″W | Federal (11677) | | |
| Sir George-Étienne Cartier National Historic Site of Canada | 456 - 462 Notre Dame Street East; Montreal QC | 45°30′40″N 73°33′06″W | Federal (7485, (13177) | | More images |
| Historic and natural borough of Mount Royal | Montreal QC | 45°30′12″N 73°36′11″W | Quebec (15283) | | More images |
| Charles Sheppard House (3) | 2080-A Jeanne Mance Street; Ville-Marie QC | 45°30′31″N 73°34′14″W | Quebec (15319) | | |
| Charles Sheppard House (2) | 2078 Jeanne Mance Street; Ville-Marie QC | 45°30′31″N 73°34′13″W | Quebec (15320) | | |
| Charles Sheppard House (1) | 2074 Jeanne Mance Street; Ville-Marie QC | 45°30′31″N 73°34′13″W | Quebec (15321) | | |
| Maison Charles-Sheppard (4) | 2082 Jeanne Mance Street; Ville-Marie QC | 45°30′31″N 73°34′15″W | Quebec (15322) | | |
| Château De Ramezay / India House National Historic Site of Canada | 280 Notre Dame Street East; Ville-Marie QC | 45°30′31″N 73°33′13″W | Federal (15825) | | |
| Montreal's Birthplace National Historic Site of Canada | 214 Place d'Youville, Montreal; Ville-Marie QC | 45°30′10″N 73°33′14″W | Federal (16022) | | More images |
| Canadian National Railways Central Station | 895 De la Gauchetiere St. West; Ville-Marie QC | 45°30′00″N 73°33′58″W | Federal (16142) | | More images |
| St. James United Church National Historic Site of Canada | 463 Saint Catherine Street West; Ville-Marie QC | 45°30′19″N 73°34′06″W | Federal (16149) | | |
| Model City of Mount Royal National Historic Site of Canada | Town of Mount Royal QC | 45°31′00″N 73°38′42″W | Federal (16211) | | More images |
| Nuns' Island Gas Station | 201, Rue Berlioz; Verdun QC | 45°27′36″N 73°32′40″W | Quebec (16298) | | |
| Montreal Botanical Garden National Historic Site of Canada | 4101 Sherbrooke Street East, Montreal; Rosemont–La Petite-Patrie QC | 45°33′37″N 73°33′46″W | Federal (16402) | | More images |
| Saint-Sulpice Seminary and its Garden National Historic Site of Canada | 16 Notre Dame Street West; Ville-Marie QC | 45°30′14″N 73°33′22″W | Federal (17381), Quebec (5649) | | |
| Maison Beaudry | 14678 Notre-Dame Street East; Rivière-des-Prairies–Pointe-aux-Trembles QC | 45°40′36″N 73°29′30″W | Quebec (6920) | | |
| Battle of Rivière des Prairies / Battle of Coulée Grou National Historic Site of Canada | 13470 Gouin Boulevard East; Rivière-des-Prairies–Pointe-aux-Trembles QC | 45°41′57″N 73°30′10″W | Federal (14642) | | More images |
| Maison Urgel-Charbonneau | 11931 Notre Dame Street East; Rivière-des-Prairies–Pointe-aux-Trembles QC | 45°38′20″N 73°29′29″W | Quebec (4532) | | More images |
| Moulin à vent de Pointe-aux-Trembles | 11630 Notre Dame Street Est; Rivière-des-Prairies–Pointe-aux-Trembles QC | 45°38′05″N 73°29′33″W | Quebec (5278) | | More images |
| Maison Christin-Dit-Saint-Amour | 12930 Gouin Boulevard East; Rivière-des-Prairies–Pointe-aux-Trembles QC | 45°41′47″N 73°31′04″W | Quebec (6896) | | More images |
| Vieux Village de Rivière-des-Prairies | Bounded by St. Lawrence River, Boulevard Perras, 68th Avenue, and Rue 71e Rivière-des-Prairies–Pointe-aux-Trembles QC | 45°39′44″N 73°33′40″W | Quebec (13854) | | |
| Maison Bleau | 13200 Gouin Boulevard East; Rivière-des-Prairies–Pointe-aux-Trembles QC | 45°41′53″N 73°30′40″W | Quebec (14785) | | More images |
| Maison Andegrave | 5460 Gouin Boulevard East; Rivière-des-Prairies–Pointe-aux-Trembles QC | 45°36′56″N 73°38′07″W | Quebec (5031) | | More images |
| Maison Brignon-Dit-Lapierre | 4251 Gouin Boulevard East; Rivière-des-Prairies–Pointe-aux-Trembles QC | 45°35′58″N 73°38′36″W | Quebec (14783) | | More images |
| Maison Dagenais | 5555 Jarry Street East; St. Leonard QC | 45°35′09″N 73°35′24″W | Quebec (5293) | | More images |
| Maison Gervais-Roy | 6255 Jarry Street East; St. Leonard QC | 45°35′34″N 73°35′02″W | Quebec (9354) | | More images |
| Maison Longpré | 6450 38ieme Avenue; Rosemont–La Petite-Patrie QC | 45°34′13″N 73°34′17″W | Quebec (4542) | | More images |
| Château Dufresne | 4040 Sherbrooke Street East; Mercier–Hochelaga-Maisonneuve QC | 45°33′13″N 73°33′12″W | Quebec (9773) | | More images |
| Site du patrimoine de l'Église-de-Saint-Esprit-de-Rosemont | 2851 Masson Street; Rosemont–La Petite-Patrie QC | 45°32′52″N 73°34′30″W | Quebec (6539), Rosemont–La Petite-Patrie municipality (––) | | More images |
| Maison du Pressoir | 10865 Du Pressoir Street; Ahuntsic-Cartierville QC | 45°34′33″N 73°39′34″W | Quebec (5279) | | More images |
| Maison Persillier-Dit-Lachapelle | Gouin Boulevard East; Ahuntsic-Cartierville QC | 45°34′28″N 73°39′32″W | Quebec (6251) | | More images |
| Ancien village du Sault-au-Récollet | Ahuntsic-Cartierville QC | 45°34′29″N 73°39′32″W | Quebec (6696) | | More images |
| Église du Sault-au-Récollet | 1829 Gouin Boulevard East; Ahuntsic-Cartierville QC | 45°34′13″N 73°39′40″W | Quebec (5287) | | |
| Maison Saint-Joseph-du-Sault-au-Récollet | 1700, Boulevard Henri-Bourassa Est, Montreal; Ahuntsic-Cartierville QC | 45°34′08″N 73°39′32″W | Quebec (9364) | | |
| Théâtre des Variétés | 4530 Papineau Avenue; Le Plateau-Mont-Royal QC | 45°32′00″N 73°34′31″W | Quebec (8888) | | More images |
| Sanctuaire du Saint-Sacrement | 500 Mount Royal Avenue Est; Le Plateau-Mont-Royal QC | 45°31′33″N 73°34′56″W | Quebec (9368) | | More images |
| Maison Lionais | 4100 De Lorimier Avenue; Le Plateau-Mont-Royal QC | 45°31′57″N 73°33′01″W | Quebec (5090) | | More images |
| Prison des Patriotes-au-Pied-du-Courant | 905 De Lorimier Avenue; Ville-Marie QC | 45°31′22″N 73°32′46″W | Quebec (7177) | | More images |
| Maison Arthur-Dubuc | 434 Sherbrooke Street East; Ville-Marie QC | 45°31′03″N 73°34′00″W | Quebec (4533) | | More images |
| Maison L'Archevêque | 1643-1647 De La Visitation Street; Ville-Marie QC | 45°31′14″N 73°33′28″W | Quebec (4543) | | More images |
| Maison Marguerite-Hay | 511 Montcalm Street; Ville-Marie QC | 45°30′57″N 73°33′00″W | Quebec (6915) | | More images |
| Clocher de l'Église-de-Saint-Jacques | 1455 Saint-Denis Street; Ville-Marie QC | 45°30′51″N 73°33′40″W | Quebec (11992) | | More images |
| Transept Sud de l'Église-de-Saint-Jacques | 455 Saint Catherine Street East; Ville-Marie QC | 45°30′52″N 73°33′39″W | Quebec (12020) | | More images |
| Site historique de Saint-Pierre-Apôtre | Panet Street; Ville-Marie QC | 45°31′08″N 73°33′12″W | Quebec (12376) | | |
| Pavillon Mailloux National Historic Site of Canada | 1560 Sherbrooke Street East; Ville-Marie QC | 45°31′34″N 73°33′52″W | Federal (12965) | | More images |
| St. George Antiochian Orthodox Church National Historic Site of Canada | 555-575 Jean-Talon Street East; Villeray–Saint-Michel–Parc-Extension QC | 45°32′24″N 73°36′51″W | Federal (12813) | | More images |
| Cinéma Le Château | 6950 Saint-Denis Street; Villeray–Saint-Michel–Parc-Extension QC | 45°32′13″N 73°36′44″W | Quebec (9346), Villeray–Saint-Michel–Parc-Extension municipality (5863) | | More images |
| Church of Notre-Dame-de-la-Défense National Historic Site of Canada | 6800 Henri-Julien Avenue; Villeray–Saint-Michel–Parc-Extension QC | 45°32′12″N 73°36′30″W | Federal (7409) | | More images |
| The Main National Historic Site of Canada | Saint Laurent Street (de la Commune-Jean Talon), Montreal; Montreal QC | 45°31′16″N 73°35′18″W | Federal (1813) | | More images |
| Monastère des Carmélites | 351 Du Carmel Avenue; Le Plateau-Mont-Royal QC | 45°31′42″N 73°35′41″W | Quebec (12111) | | More images |
| Rialto Theatre | 5711-5723 Park Avenue; Le Plateau-Mont-Royal QC | 45°31′24″N 73°36′18″W | Federal (1198), Quebec (9881), Le Plateau-Mont-Royal municipality (5034) | | More images |
| Regent Theatre | 5117 Park Avenue; Le Plateau-Mont-Royal QC | 45°31′12″N 73°35′47″W | Quebec (6436) | | More images |
| Théâtre Outremont | Outremont QC | 45°31′12″N 73°36′31″W | Federal (7469), Quebec (8106), Outremont municipality (6439) | Q3527534 | More images |
| Mount Royal Cemetery | Côte-des-Neiges–Notre-Dame-de-Grâce QC | 45°30′33″N 73°35′53″W | Federal (14600) | Q1457377 | More images |
| Maisons Emmanuel-Saint-Louis | 4105-4127, Rue Saint-Denis; Montreal QC | 45°31′17″N 73°34′36″W | Quebec (5070) | | More images |
| Site du patrimoine de l'Église-de-Saint-Jean-Baptiste | Rue Rachel Est; Montreal QC | 45°31′16″N 73°34′44″W | Quebec (6937) | | More images |
| Marlborough Apartments National Historic Site of Canada | 570 Milton Street; Montreal QC | 45°30′26″N 73°34′32″W | Federal (1158) | | More images |
| Maison Samuel-Burland | 3567, Rue Saint-Urbain; Montreal QC | 45°30′45″N 73°34′22″W | Quebec (4536) | | More images |
| Édifice Blumenthal | 305, Rue Sainte-Catherine Ouest; Montreal QC | 45°30′24″N 73°34′00″W | Quebec (6279) | | More images |
| Le Monument-National | 1166-1182, Boulevard Saint-Laurent; Montreal QC | 45°30′33″N 73°33′43″W | Quebec (7154) | | |
| Bibliothèque Saint-Sulpice | 1700, Rue Saint-Denis; Montreal QC | 45°30′55″N 73°33′51″W | Quebec (8525) | | More images |
| Maison Mackenzie-Brydges | 81, Rue Sherbrooke Ouest; Montreal QC | 45°30′42″N 73°34′12″W | Quebec (9005) | | More images |
| Manufacture Louis-Ovide-Grothé | 2004, Boulevard Saint-Laurent; Montreal QC | 45°30′40″N 73°34′02″W | Quebec (9033) | | More images |
| Monastère du Bon-Pasteur | 100, Rue Sherbrooke Est; Montreal QC | 45°30′49″N 73°34′08″W | Quebec (9102) | | More images |
| Ancien collège du Mont-Saint-Louis | 230, Rue Sherbrooke Est; Montreal QC | 45°30′54″N 73°34′06″W | Quebec (9340) | | More images |
| Édifice Joseph-Arthur-Godin | 2112, Boulevard Saint-Laurent; Montreal QC | 45°30′45″N 73°34′10″W | Quebec (9561) | | More images |
| Maison William-Notman | 51, Rue Sherbrooke Ouest; Montreal QC | 45°30′42″N 73°34′12″W | Quebec (10595) | | |
| Maison Louis-Fréchette | 306, Rue Sherbrooke Est; Montreal QC | 45°30′58″N 73°34′04″W | Quebec (10660) | | More images |
| Monument National National Historic Site of Canada | 1182 Saint Laurent; Montreal QC | 45°30′32″N 73°33′44″W | Federal (14663) | | More images |
| Bank of Montréal National Historic Site of Canada | 1850 Notre Dame Street Ouest; Montreal QC | 45°29′16″N 73°34′07″W | Federal (1200) | | More images |
| Arrondissement historique de Montréal | Montreal QC | 45°30′14″N 73°33′18″W | Quebec (2117) | | More images |
| Façade de l'Édifice-Alexander-Cross | 43 a 51, Rue Saint-Jacques Ouest; Montreal QC | 45°30′19″N 73°33′25″W | Quebec (5281) | | More images |
| Vieux Séminaire de Saint-Sulpice | 116, Rue Notre-Dame Ouest; Montreal QC | 45°30′14″N 73°33′18″W | Quebec (5921) | | |
| Maison Papineau | 440, Rue Bonsecours; Montreal QC | 45°30′36″N 73°33′08″W | Federal (7521), Quebec (6878) | | More images |
| Maison de La Minerve | 161-163, Rue Saint-Paul Est; Montreal QC | 45°30′26″N 73°33′10″W | Quebec (7031) | | More images |
| Maison à l'Enseigne-du-Patriote | 169, Rue Saint-Paul Est; Montreal QC | 45°30′27″N 73°33′09″W | Quebec (7040) | | More images |
| Bonsecours Market National Historic Site of Canada | 300 Saint-Paul Street East; Montreal QC | 45°30′30″N 73°33′08″W | Federal (7560) | | More images |
| Former Montréal Custom House National Historic Site of Canada | 150 Saint Paul Street West; Montreal QC | 45°30′15″N 73°33′17″W | Federal (7828) | | More images |
| Château De Ramezay | 280-290, Rue Notre-Dame Est; Montreal QC | 45°30′31″N 73°33′11″W | Quebec (7959) | | More images |
| Maison Hubert-Paré | 273, Rue Saint-Paul Est; Montreal QC | 45°30′29″N 73°33′08″W | Quebec (8310) | | More images |
| Façade de l'Édifice-de-la-Great Scottish Life Insurance | 701-711, Cote de la Place-d'Armes; Montreal QC | 45°30′20″N 73°33′29″W | Quebec (8345) | | More images |
| Maison Brossard-Gauvin | 433, Rue Saint-Louis; Montreal QC | 45°30′40″N 73°33′13″W | Quebec (8886) | | More images |
| Maison Elizabeth-Mittleberger-Platt | 220, Boulevard Saint-Laurent; Montreal QC | 45°30′18″N 73°33′11″W | Quebec (9006) | | More images |
| Maison Jane-Tate | 416, Rue de Bonsecours; Montreal QC | 45°30′36″N 73°33′07″W | Quebec (9036) | | More images |
| Façade de la Banque-du-Peuple | 53, Rue Saint-Jacques; Montreal QC | 45°30′21″N 73°33′24″W | Quebec (9037) | | More images |
| Maison Perrine-Charles-Cherrier | 410, Place Jacques-Cartier; Montreal QC | 45°30′27″N 73°33′09″W | Quebec (9359) | | More images |
| Auberge Del Vecchio | 404, Place Jacques-Cartier; Montreal QC | 45°30′27″N 73°33′09″W | Quebec (9365) | | More images |
| Édifice de la Canada Life | 275, Rue Saint-Jacques; Montreal QC | 45°30′10″N 73°33′34″W | Quebec (9633) | | More images |
| Grey Nuns' Hospital National Historic Site of Canada | 138 Saint-Pierre Street; Montreal QC | 45°30′02″N 73°33′18″W | Federal (9651) | | More images |
| Maison Marie-Pierre-Viger | 160, Rue Saint-Amable; Montreal QC | 45°30′26″N 73°33′12″W | Quebec (9963) | | More images |
| Vieux palais de justice de Montréal | 105, Rue Notre-Dame Est; Montreal QC | 45°30′27″N 73°33′18″W | Quebec (10182) | | More images |
| Maison et entrepôt Edward-William-Gray | 427, Rue Saint-Vincent; Montreal QC | 45°30′26″N 73°33′13″W | Quebec (10952) | | More images |
| Lieu de fondation de Montréal | Montreal QC | 45°30′11″N 73°33′15″W | Quebec (11982) | | |
| Montréal City Hall National Historic Site of Canada | 275 Notre-dame Street East; Montreal QC | 45°30′32″N 73°33′14″W | Federal (12925) | | More images |
| Entrepôt Pierre-Del Vecchio | 183, Rue Saint-Paul Est; Montreal QC | 45°30′26″N 73°33′09″W | Quebec (13156) | | |
| Notre-Dame Roman Catholic Church / Basilica National Historic Site of Canada | 110 Notre-Dame Street West; Montreal QC | 45°30′17″N 73°33′23″W | Federal (13533) | | More images |
| Basilique de Saint-Patrick | 460, Boul. Rene-Levesque Ouest; Montreal QC | 45°30′18″N 73°33′53″W | Quebec (7037) | | More images |
| Édifice de la Unity Building | 454, Rue De La Gauchetiere Ouest; Montreal QC | 45°30′11″N 73°33′48″W | Quebec (9024) | | More images |
| Église de la Mission-Catholique-Chinoise-du-Saint-Esprit | Rue De La Gauchetiere Ouest; Montreal QC | 45°30′19″N 73°33′43″W | Quebec (10162) | | More images |
| Presbytère de la Mission-Catholique-Chinoise-du-Saint-Esprit | 205 a 211, Rue De La Gauchetiere Ouest; Montreal QC | 45°30′19″N 73°33′43″W | Quebec (10163) | | |
| St. Patrick's Basilica National Historic Site of Canada | 454 Rene Levesque Boulevard West; Montreal QC | 45°30′14″N 73°33′56″W | Federal (12104) | | |
| Christ Church Cathedral | 1444 Union Avenue; Montreal QC | 45°30′13″N 73°34′11″W | Federal (7825), Quebec (5302) | | More images |
| Banque Toronto-Dominion | 1401, Rue Bleury; Montreal QC | 45°30′23″N 73°34′02″W | Quebec (5780) | | More images |
| Restaurant de L'Île-de-France | 677, Rue Sainte-Catherine Ouest; Montreal QC | 45°30′09″N 73°34′15″W | Quebec (6985) | | |
| H. Vincent Meredith Residence National Historic Site of Canada | 1110 des Pins Avenue West; Montreal QC | 45°30′15″N 73°34′55″W | Federal (7534) | | More images |
| Édifice du Mount Stephen Club | 1440, Rue Drummond; Montreal QC | 45°29′57″N 73°34′33″W | Quebec (9100) | | More images |
| Édifice du Club-Universitaire-de-Montréal | 2047, Rue Mansfield; Montreal QC | 45°30′10″N 73°34′26″W | Quebec (9347) | | More images |
| Maison John-Date | 2020-2026, Rue Jeanne-Mance; Montreal QC | 45°30′30″N 73°34′07″W | Quebec (9353) | | More images |
| Maison James-Reid-Wilson | 1201, Rue Sherbrooke Ouest; Montreal QC | 45°30′03″N 73°34′41″W | Quebec (9634) | | More images |
| Maison Lord-Atholstan | 1172, Rue Sherbrooke Ouest; Montreal QC | 45°30′03″N 73°34′39″W | Quebec (9644) | | More images |
| Maison Louis-Joseph-Forget | 1195, Rue Sherbrooke Ouest; Montreal QC | 45°30′03″N 73°34′41″W | Quebec (10186) | | More images |
| Église Saint-James | Rue Sainte-Catherine Ouest; Montreal QC | 45°30′19″N 73°34′06″W | Quebec (10187) | | More images |
| Hersey Pavilion National Historic Site of Canada | 687, Avenue des Pins Ouest; Montreal QC | 45°30′30″N 73°34′53″W | Federal (10618) | | More images |
| Édifice du Mount Royal Club | 1175, Rue Sherbrooke Ouest; Montreal QC | 45°30′03″N 73°34′37″W | Quebec (11994) | | More images |
| Hochelaga National Historic Site of Canada | Sherbrooke Street West; Montreal QC | 45°30′13″N 73°34′30″W | Federal (12017) | | More images |
| Maison Daniel-Kneen | 2090, Rue Jeanne-Mance; Montreal QC | 45°30′32″N 73°34′16″W | Quebec (12895) | | More images |
| Maison Andreas-C.-F.-Finzel | 2048-2052, Rue Jeanne-Mance; Montreal QC | 45°30′31″N 73°34′10″W | Quebec (13127) | | More images |
| Maison William-Cairns | 2032, Rue Jeanne-Mance; Montreal QC | 45°30′30″N 73°34′08″W | Quebec (13262) | | More images |
| Maison Walter-Marriage | 2070, Rue Jeanne-Mance; Montreal QC | 45°30′31″N 73°34′12″W | Quebec (13298) | | |
| Maison Victoria-J.-Prentice | 2086, Rue Jeanne-Mance; Montreal QC | 45°30′32″N 73°34′15″W | Quebec (13345) | | |
| Maison John-L.-Jensen | 2028, Rue Jeanne-Mance; Montreal QC | 45°30′30″N 73°34′08″W | Quebec (13452) | | |
| Maison John-T.-Hagger | 2044, Rue Jeanne-Mance; Montreal QC | 45°30′30″N 73°34′10″W | Quebec (13454) | | |
| Maison Thomas-Fraser | 2038-2042, Rue Jeanne-Mance; Montreal QC | 45°30′30″N 73°34′09″W | Quebec (13455) | | More images |
| Maison Janvier-Arthur-Vaillancourt (1) | 2054, Rue Jeanne-Mance; Montreal QC | 45°30′31″N 73°34′11″W | Quebec (13456) | | |
| Maison Janvier-Arthur-Vaillancourt (3) | 2066, Rue Jeanne-Mance; Montreal QC | 45°30′31″N 73°34′10″W | Quebec (13457) | | |
| Maison Janvier-Arthur-Vaillancourt (2) | 2058, Rue Jeanne-Mance; Montreal QC | 45°30′31″N 73°34′11″W | Quebec (13470) | | |
| Black Watch (Royal Highland Regiment) of Canada Armoury National Historic Site of Canada | 2067 de Bleury Street; Montreal QC | 45°30′28″N 73°34′12″W | Federal (14121, (11096) | | |
| Windsor Station | 1100 De La Gauchetiere West; Montreal QC | 45°29′49″N 73°34′05″W | Federal (4517), Quebec (13481) | | More images |
| Windsor Station (Canadian Pacific) National Historic Site of Canada | 910 Peel Street; Montreal QC | 45°29′50″N 73°34′04″W | Federal (4916) | | |
| Maison William-Dow | 1175, Place du Frere-Andre; Montreal QC | 45°30′14″N 73°34′01″W | Quebec (9360) | | More images |
| Marie-Reine-du-Monde Cathedral National Historic Site of Canada | 1085 Cathedral Street; Montreal QC | 45°29′57″N 73°34′06″W | Federal (9908) | | More images |
| Église du Gesù | Rue De Bleury; Montreal QC | 45°30′21″N 73°33′58″W | Quebec (12387) | | More images |
| St. George's Anglican Church National Historic Site of Canada | 1101 Stanley Street; Montreal QC | 45°29′51″N 73°34′10″W | Federal (12771) | | More images |
| Entrepôt Buchanan | 777, Rue de la Commune Ouest; Montreal QC | 45°29′45″N 73°33′11″W | Quebec (9352) | | More images |
| Maison Abner-Bagg | 166, Rue King; Montreal QC | 45°29′56″N 73°33′24″W | Quebec (10456) | | More images |
| Elevator 5 B1 | Montreal QC | 45°29′53″N 73°33′00″W | Federal (11070) | | |
| Elevator 5 B | Montreal QC | 45°29′49″N 73°33′01″W | Federal (11292) | | More images |
| Habitat-67 | 2600, Avenue Pierre-Dupuy; Montreal QC | 45°30′03″N 73°32′39″W | Quebec (12446) | | More images |
| Wilson Chambers National Historic Site of Canada | 502-510 McGill Street; Montreal QC | 45°30′04″N 73°33′36″W | Federal (13074) | | More images |
| George Stephen House National Historic Site of Canada | 1440 Drummond Street; Montreal QC | 45°29′57″N 73°34′32″W | Federal (3429) | | |
| Maison Louis-Hippolyte-Lafontaine | 1395, Rue Overdale; Montreal QC | 45°29′42″N 73°34′21″W | Quebec (4531) | | More images |
| Maison Joseph-Aldéric-Raymond | 1507, Avenue Docteur Penfield; Montreal QC | 45°29′54″N 73°35′05″W | Quebec (5030) | | More images |
| Site historique de la Maison-John-Wilson-McConnell | 1475, Avenue des Pins Ouest; Montreal QC | 45°29′56″N 73°35′12″W | Quebec (5045) | | More images |
| Maison John-Wilson-McConnell | 1475, Avenue des Pins Ouest; Montreal QC | 45°29′56″N 73°35′12″W | Quebec (5046) | | More images |
| Maison Ernest-Cormier | 1418, Avenue des Pins Ouest; Montreal QC | 45°30′01″N 73°35′07″W | Quebec (6984) | | More images |
| Façade des Appartements-Bishop Court | 1463, Rue Bishop; Montreal QC | 45°29′50″N 73°34′40″W | Quebec (8885) | | More images |
| Maison Charles-G.-Greenshields | 1515, Avenue du Docteur-Penfield; Montreal QC | 45°29′52″N 73°35′07″W | Quebec (9035) | | More images |
| Erskine and American United Church National Historic Site of Canada | 1339 Sherbrooke Street West; Montreal QC | 45°29′57″N 73°34′46″W | Federal (9309) | | More images |
| Théâtre Séville | 2153a2159, Rue Sainte-Catherine Ouest; Montreal QC | 45°29′27″N 73°34′58″W | Quebec (4537) | | |
| Maison David-Lewis | 3424, Rue Simpson; Montreal QC | 45°29′52″N 73°34′57″W | Quebec (5089) | | More images |
| Montréal Forum National Historic Site of Canada | Atwater Street; Montreal QC | 45°29′24″N 73°35′05″W | Federal (7464) | | |
| Atwater Library of the Mechanics' Institute of Montréal National Historic Site of Canada | 1200 Atwater Avenue; Montreal QC | 45°29′19″N 73°35′02″W | Federal (7817) | | More images |
| Tours du Fort-des-Messieurs-de-Saint-Sulpice | 2065, Rue Sherbrooke Ouest; Montreal QC | 45°29′37″N 73°35′06″W | Quebec (9355) | | |
| Maison Shaughnessy | 1923, Boulevard Rene-Levesque Ouest; Montreal QC | 45°29′27″N 73°34′41″W | Quebec (9562) | | More images |
| Chapelle de l'Invention-de-la-Sainte-Croix | Rue Guy; Montreal QC | 45°29′36″N 73°34′38″W | Quebec (9945) | | |
| Maison mère des Soeurs-Grises-de-Montréal | Boulevard Rene-Levesque Ouest; Montreal QC | 45°29′37″N 73°34′31″W | Federal (18952), Quebec (10228) | | More images |
| L'Îlot-Trafalgar-Gleneagles | Montreal QC | 45°29′43″N 73°35′42″W | Quebec (11988) | | More images |
| Domaine des Messieurs-de-Saint-Sulpice | Rue Sherbrooke Ouest; Montreal QC | 45°29′38″N 73°35′09″W | Quebec (12423) | | More images |
| Masonic Memorial Temple National Historic Site of Canada | 2295 Saint-Marc Street and 1805 Sherbrooke Street Ouest; Montreal QC | 45°29′41″N 73°34′58″W | Federal (12542) | | More images |
| Sulpician Towers / Fort de la Montagne National Historic Site of Canada | 2065 Sherbrooke Street West; Montreal QC | 45°29′38″N 73°35′05″W | Federal (14541) | | More images |
| Van Horne / Shaughnessy House National Historic Site of Canada | 1923 Rene-Levesque Boulevard West; Montreal QC | 45°29′27″N 73°34′42″W | Federal (18725) | | |
| Église de Saint-Joseph | 550, Rue Richmond; Montreal QC | 45°29′22″N 73°34′07″W | Montreal municipality (4845) | | More images |
| Cinéma Corona | 2490, Rue Notre-Dame Ouest; Montreal QC | 45°28′59″N 73°34′31″W | Quebec (9344) | | More images |
| Maison Saint-Gabriel | 2146, Place Dublin; Montreal QC | 45°28′34″N 73°33′22″W | Federal (12094), Quebec (5288) | | More images |
| Croix de chemin en pierre du Haut-du-Sault | Boulevard Gouin Ouest; Montreal QC | 45°32′41″N 73°42′01″W | Quebec (7709) | | More images |
| Notre-Dame-des-Neiges Cemetery National Historic Site of Canada | 4601 Cote-des-Neiges Road; Montreal QC | 45°29′44″N 73°36′51″W | Federal (15065) | | More images |
| Maison Jarry-Dit-Henrichon | 5085, Rue Decelles; Montreal QC | 45°29′48″N 73°37′02″W | Quebec (6869) | | More images |
| Site du patrimoine du Mont-Royal | Montreal QC | 45°30′12″N 73°36′11″W | Quebec (8517) | | More images |
| Saint Joseph’s Oratory of Mount Royal National Historic Site of Canada | 3800 Queen Mary Road; Montreal QC | 45°29′31″N 73°36′58″W | Federal (11855) | | More images |
| Maison James-Monk | 4245, Boulevard Decarie; Montreal QC | 45°28′53″N 73°37′03″W | Quebec (13012) | | More images |
| Maison Hurtubise | 561 Chemin de la Cote-Saint-Antoine; Westmount QC | 45°28′51″N 73°36′30″W | Quebec (9101), Westmount municipality (9109) | | More images |
| Maison Braemar | 3219, The Boulevard; Westmount QC | 45°29′29″N 73°36′00″W | Quebec (11233) | | More images |
| Trafalgar Lodge National Historic Site of Canada | 3021 Trafalgar Avenue; Montreal QC | 45°29′42″N 73°35′54″W | Federal (13136) | | More images |
| Maison mère de la Congrégation-de-Notre-Dame | 3040, Rue Sherbrooke Ouest; Montreal QC | 45°29′22″N 73°35′15″W | Quebec (7153) | | More images |
| Church of Saint-Léon-de-Westmount | 4311 boulevard De Maisonneuve Ouest, Westmount, Québec, H3Z 1L1 | 5°29′07″N 73°35′31″W | Federal (7596) | Q533358 | More images |
| Monklands / Villa Maria Convent National Historic Site of Canada | 4245 Decarie Boulevard; Montreal QC | 45°28′45″N 73°37′09″W | Federal (14406) | | More images |
| Maisons Louis-et-Joseph-Richard | 4351-4363, Rue Sainte-Ambroise; Montreal QC | 45°28′26″N 73°34′58″W | Quebec (6303) | | More images |
| Côte-Saint-Paul | Montreal QC | 45°27′47″N 73°35′11″W | Quebec (6938) | | More images |
| Maison Nivard-De Saint-Dizier | 7244, Boulevard LaSalle; Montreal QC | 45°26′14″N 73°34′58″W | Quebec (6930) | | More images |
| Arrondissement naturel du Bois-de-Saraguay | Boulevard Gouin Ouest; Montreal QC | 45°30′53″N 73°44′33″W | Quebec (13471) | | More images |
| Maison Mary-Dorothy-Molson | 9095, Boulevard Gouin Ouest; Montreal QC | 45°31′08″N 73°44′40″W | Quebec (14835) | | More images |
| Église de Saint-Laurent | 805, Boulevard Sainte-Croix; Montreal QC | 45°30′50″N 73°40′26″W | Quebec (5088) | | More images |
| Maison Penniston | 7525, Boulevard LaSalle; Montreal QC | 45°26′02″N 73°35′17″W | Quebec (4535) | | More images |
| 33-35, Rue Alepin | 33, Rue Alepin; Montreal QC | 45°25′59″N 73°35′24″W | Quebec (6605) | | More images |
| 9601, Boulevard LaSalle | 9601, Boulevard LaSalle; Montreal QC | 45°25′21″N 73°39′17″W | Quebec (4843) | | More images |
| Maison De Lorimier-Bélanger | 9603, Boulevard LaSalle; Montreal QC | 45°25′21″N 73°39′17″W | Quebec (4844) | | More images |
| Moulin à vent Fleming | 9675, Boulevard LaSalle; Montreal QC | 45°25′35″N 73°39′35″W | Quebec (6954) | | More images |
| Site archéologique de l'Église-des-Saints-Anges-de-Lachine | Boulevard LaSalle; Montreal QC | 45°25′27″N 73°39′24″W | Quebec (11248) | | More images |
| LeBer-LeMoyne House National Historic Site of Canada | 110 de LaSalle Road; Lachine QC | 45°25′47″N 73°40′01″W | Federal (12628) | | More images |
| The Fur Trade at Lachine National Historic Site of Canada | 1255 Saint Joseph Boulevard and 12ieme Lachine QC | 45°25′53″N 73°40′33″W | Federal (12746) | | |
| Site historique et archéologique Le Ber-Le Moyne | 100, Chemin de LaSalle; Montreal QC | 45°25′47″N 73°39′59″W | Quebec (13266) | | More images |
| Lachine Canal National Historic Site of Canada | Montreal QC | 45°28′09″N 73°35′29″W | Federal (13412) | | More images |
| Église de Saint-Raphaël-Archange | 495, Rue Cherrier; Montreal QC | 45°29′13″N 73°52′44″W | Quebec (5071) | | More images |
| Manoir Denis-Benjamin-Viger | 376, Rue Cherrier; Montreal QC | 45°29′19″N 73°52′33″W | Quebec (5072) | | More images |
| Presbytère de Saint-Raphaël-Archange | 495, Rue Cherrier; Montreal QC | 45°29′13″N 73°52′44″W | Quebec (5073) | | More images |
| École du Village | 350, Montee de l'Eglise; Montreal QC | 45°29′14″N 73°52′48″W | Quebec (5091) | | More images |
| Maison Joseph-Théoret | 20, Rue Martel; Montreal QC | 45°29′19″N 73°52′12″W | Quebec (6428) | | More images |
| Croix de chemin du Bord-du-Lac | 1859, Chemin Bord-du-Lac; Montreal QC | 45°30′05″N 73°54′43″W | Quebec (4540) | | More images |
| Croix de chemin de la montée Wilson | 1158, Montee Wilson; Montreal QC | 45°28′36″N 73°55′18″W | Quebec (4541) | | More images |
| Maison dite du Centenaire | 977, Rue Cherrier; Montreal QC | 45°28′26″N 73°54′46″W | Quebec (4847) | | More images |
| Maison Toussaint-Théoret | 1883, Chemin Bord-du-Lac; Montreal QC | 45°30′10″N 73°54′39″W | Quebec (4848) | | More images |
| Couvent des soeurs de Sainte-Anne | 16 115, Boulevard Gouin Ouest; Montreal QC | 45°28′46″N 73°52′21″W | Quebec (4846) | | More images |
| Maison D'Ailleboust-De Manthet | 15886, Boulevard Gouin Ouest; Montreal QC | 45°28′51″N 73°52′12″W | Quebec (8887) | | More images |
| Maison Montpellier-Dit-Beaulieu | 174, Rue Beaulieu; Montreal QC | 45°28′22″N 73°52′39″W | Quebec (12367) | | More images |
| Maison Lanthier | 11, Chemin Lanthier; Montreal QC | 45°26′27″N 73°53′52″W | Quebec (5040) | | More images |
| Maison Jean-Baptiste-Jamme-Dit-Carrière | 3766 Boulevard Saint-Charles Boulevard; Kirkland QC | 45°27′33″N 73°51′56″W | Quebec (8323) | | More images |
| Maison Joseph-Charlebois | 134, Chemin du Cap-Saint-Jacques; Montreal QC | 45°27′50″N 73°55′14″W | Quebec (8313) | | |
| Maison Jacques-Richer-Dit-Louveteau | 163, Chemin du Cap-Saint-Jacques; Montreal QC | 45°28′06″N 73°55′20″W | Quebec (14762) | | More images |
| Maison Thomas-Brunet | 187, Chemin du Cap-Saint-Jacques; Montreal QC | 45°28′17″N 73°56′14″W | Quebec (14836) | | More images |
| Maison Hyacinthe-Jamme-Dit-Carrière | 152, Concord Crescent; Montreal QC | 45°27′25″N 73°49′09″W | Quebec (5087) | | More images |
| Moulin à vent de Pointe-Claire | 1 Saint-Joachim Street; Pointe-Claire QC | 45°25′31″N 73°49′31″W | Quebec (5299) | | More images |
| Maison Mary-Garbutt-Angell | 530, Chemin Lakeshore; Montreal QC | 45°24′55″N 73°53′12″W | Quebec (4850) | | More images |
| Maison de Beaurepaire | 13 Rue Thompson Street; Beaconsfield QC | 45°24′53″N 73°52′45″W | Quebec (10227) | | More images |
| Maison Rangé-Dit-Laviolette | 20122, Chemin Lakeshore; Montreal QC | 45°24′46″N 73°54′10″W | Quebec (4849) | | More images |
| Maison Simon-Fraser | 153, Rue Sainte-Anne; Montreal QC | 45°24′17″N 73°57′15″W | Quebec (5037) | | More images |
| Sainte-Anne-de-Bellevue Canal | 170 Saint-Anne Road, 170 rue Sainte-Anne | 45°24′13″N 73°57′16″W | Federal (7842) | Q2936028 | More images |
| Senneville Historic District National Historic Site of Canada | 168 Senneville Road; Senneville QC | 45°25′32″N 73°58′27″W | Federal (4442), Quebec (13246) | | More images |
| Building 42 | CFB Longue-Pointe; Montreal QC | 45°34′34″N 73°31′30″W | Federal (11110) | | |
| Cinéma Impérial | 1424-1432 Rue De Bleury; Montreal QC | 45°30′24″N 73°34′03″W | Quebec (13930) | | More images |
| Customs House | 105 McGill Street; Montreal QC | 45°29′59″N 73°33′20″W | Federal (10647) | | |
| Federal Building | 715 Peel Street; Montreal QC | 45°29′48″N 73°33′58″W | Federal (11200) | | More images |
| Maison Cartier National Historic Site of Canada | 407-413 Place Jacques-Cartier; Montreal QC | 45°30′28″N 73°33′10″W | Federal (19571) | | |
| Westmount District National Historic Site of Canada | 4333 Sherbrooke Street West; Montreal QC | 45°29′07″N 73°35′47″W | Federal (19610) | | |
| Armoury | 4625 St. Catherine Street West; Westmount QC | 45°28′46″N 73°35′43″W | Federal (9838) | | More images |
| Canadian Pacific Railway Station | 4848 St. Catherine Street West; Westmount QC | 45°28′36″N 73°35′54″W | Federal (7097) | | More images |

== See also ==
- List of National Historic Sites of Canada in Montreal
