= Battle of the Lake of Two Mountains =

Battle of the Beaver Wars

Battle of the Lake of Two Mountains Bataille du Lac-des-Deux-Montagnes
- Part of the Beaver Wars
Date	October 16, 1689
Location	Lake of Two Mountains (Senneville, New France) 45.448653°N 73.940128°W
Result	French victory

Belligerents
New France	Haudenosaunee

Commanders and leaders
Daniel Greysolon, Sieur du Lhut; Nicolas d'Ailleboust de Manthet	Unknown

Strength
28 coureur des bois	22

Casualties and losses
0	18 killed, 3 captured
- Location within Montreal

The Battle of the Lake of Two Mountains (French: Bataille du Lac-des-Deux-Montagnes) took place during the Beaver Wars between the colony of New France and the Haudenosaunee Confederacy that occurred on October 16, 1689.

The battle occurred in response to the Lachine massacre of August 1689. In October, Governor General of New France, the Marquis de Denonville dispatched a scouting party of 28 coureur des bois, under the command of Daniel Greysolon, Sieur du Lhut and Nicolas d'Ailleboust de Manthet, to search for Haudenosaunee warriors that posed a threat to residents on the Island of Montreal. The coureur des bois came across a group of 22 Haudenosaunee at the Lake of Two Mountains. The French suffered no casualties, while the Haudenosaunee suffered 18 deaths, 3 captured, and 1 fled. The French victory restored the confidence of the local French inhabitants.

== Battle of the Lake of Two Mountains National Historic Site of Canada ==
The Battle of the Lake of Two Mountains was marked by a plaque in Senneville, Quebec. The site of the plaque was recognized as a National Historic Site of Canada on May 15, 1925.

== See also ==
- List of National Historic Sites of Canada in Montreal
