= Place Jacques-Cartier =

Square in Montreal, Canada

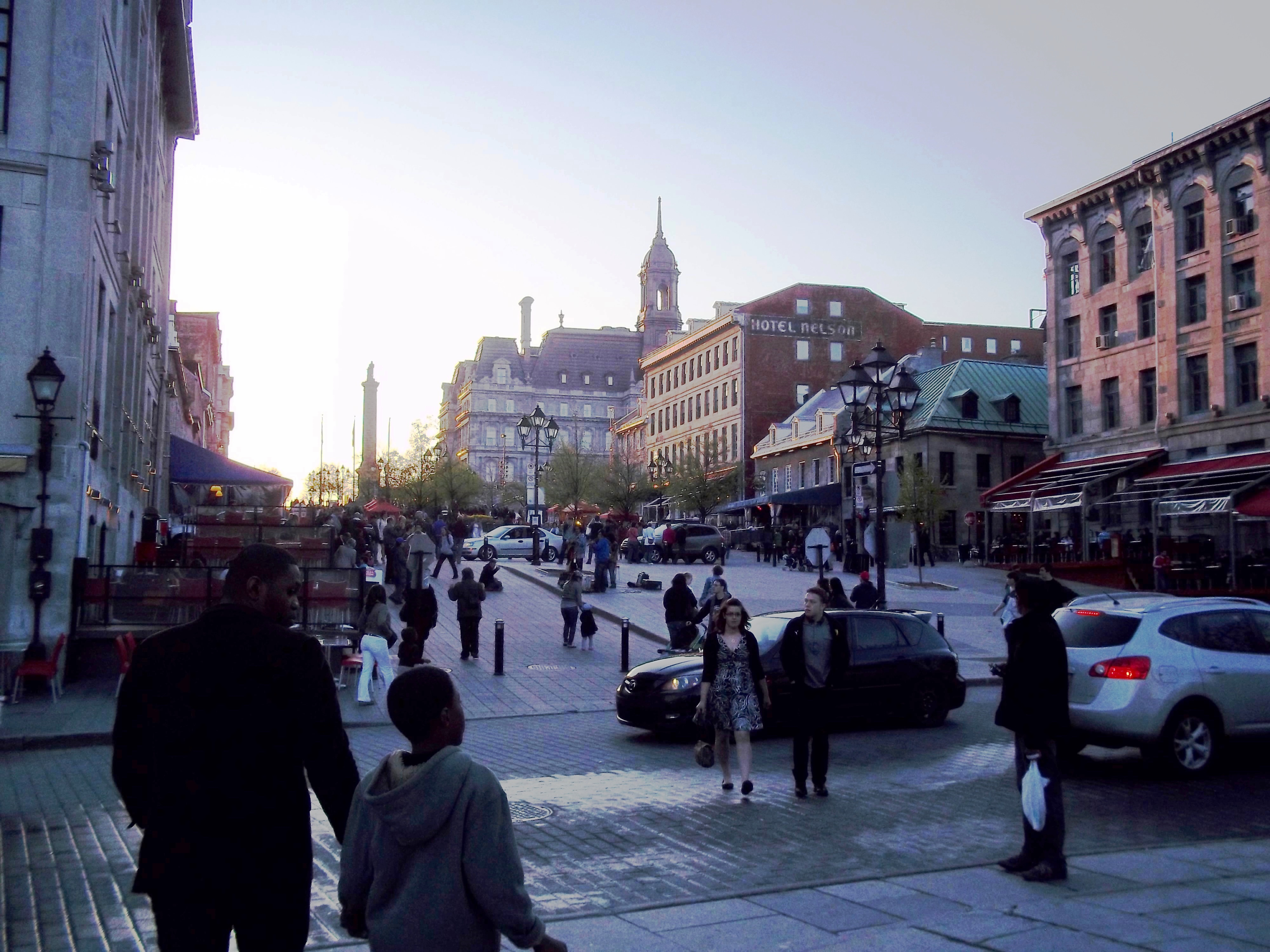
- View from rue de la Commune, 2012

- Location within Montreal
- Type: Town square
- Location: Old Montreal, Ville-Marie Montreal, Quebec, Canada
- Coordinates: 45°30′28″N 73°33′11″W
- Created: 1847
- Operator: City of Montreal
- Public transit: Champ-de-Mars

Place Jacques-Cartier (French pronunciation: [plas ʒak kaʁtje], Jacques Cartier Square) is a square located in Old Montreal, Quebec, Canada. It is an entrance to the Old Port of Montreal.

== Overview ==
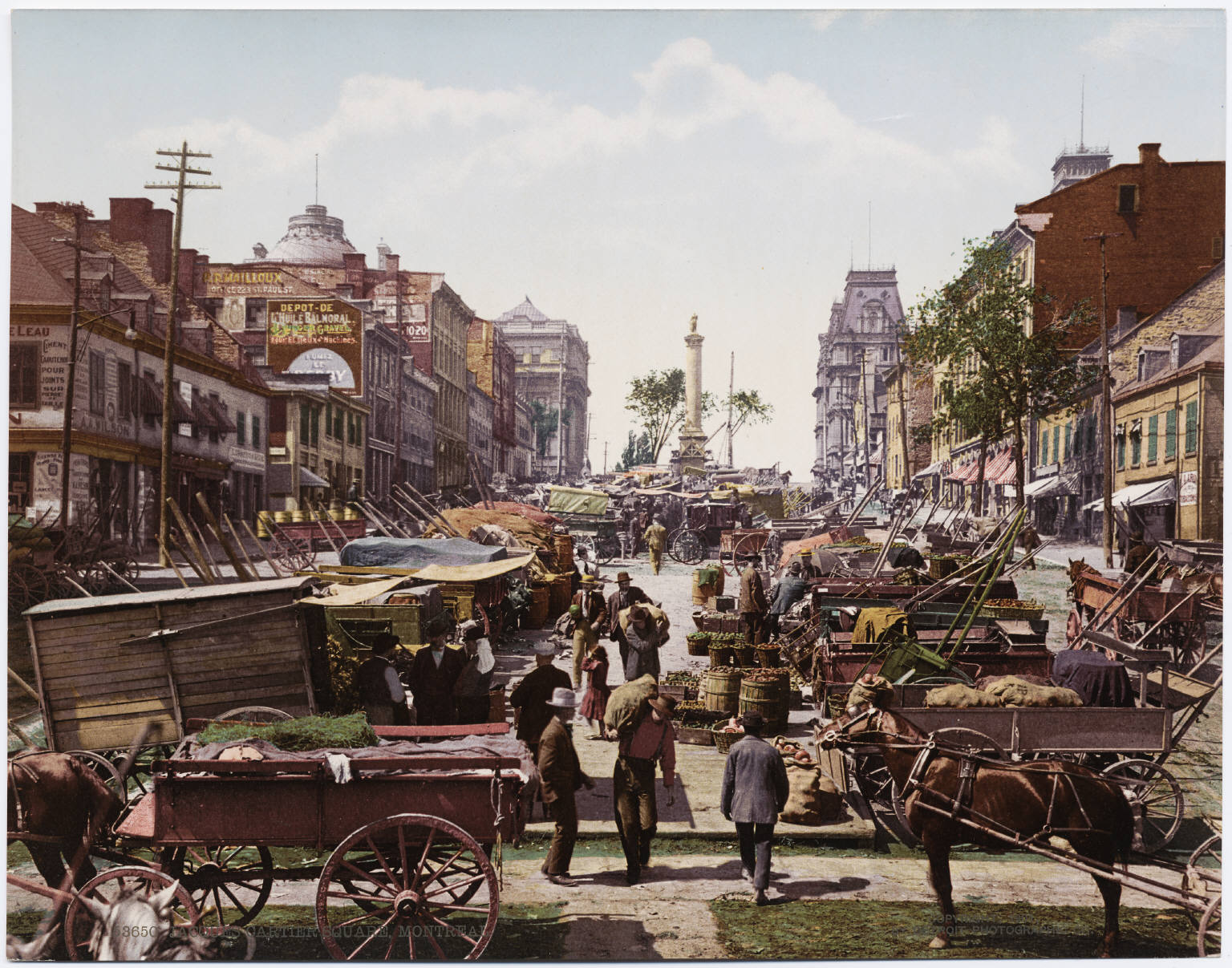
The square overlooked by Nelson's Column in its traditional role as a market place, 1900

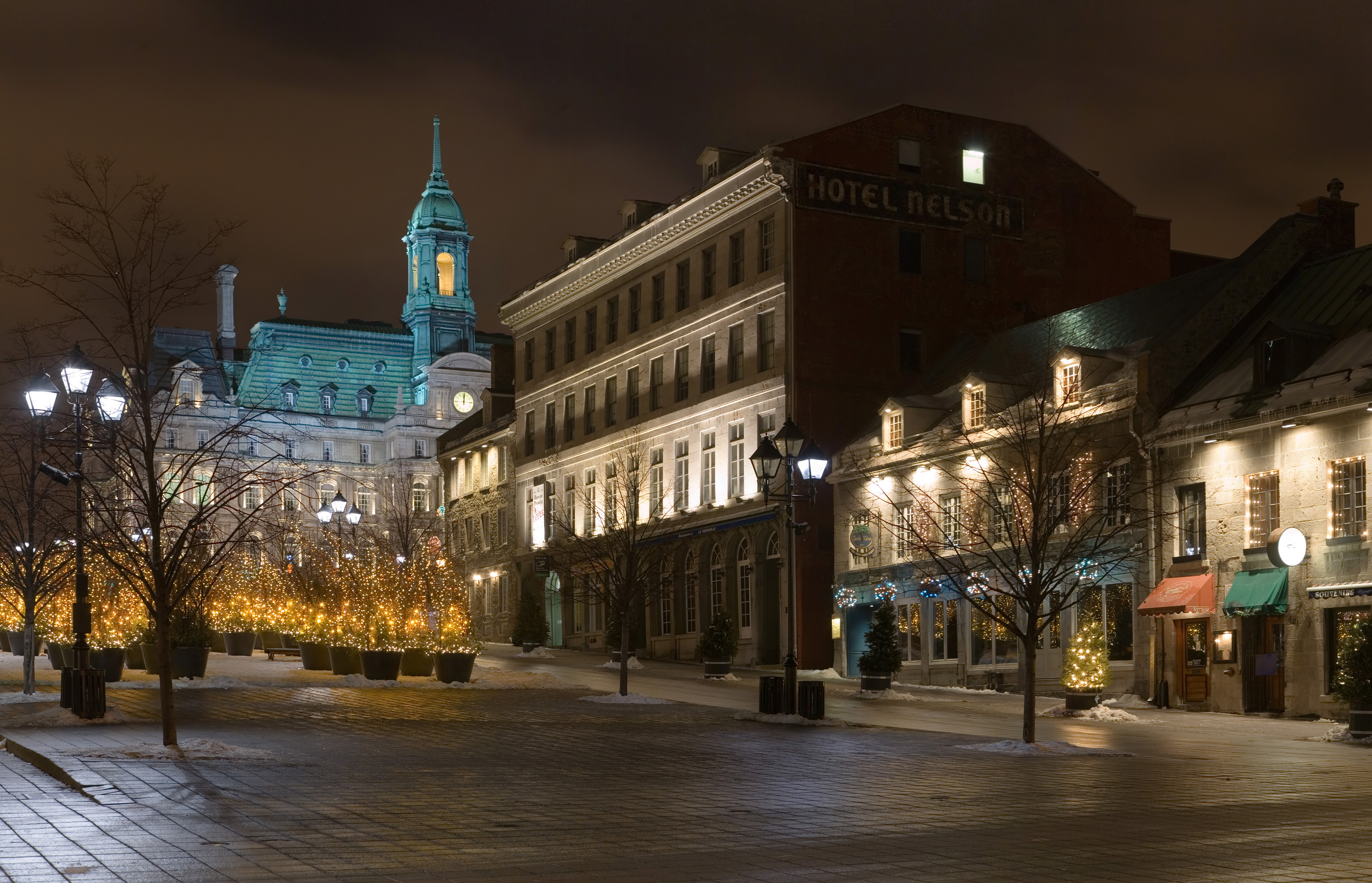
Place Jacques-Cartier on a cold winter's night

In 1723, the Château Vaudreuil was built for Philippe de Rigaud, Marquis de Vaudreuil - its formal gardens occupying the space that is now the square. The Chateau burned down in 1803 and it was suggested by The Hon. Jean-Baptiste Durocher and The Hon. Joseph Périnault that the space be transformed into a public square, known as New Market Place. In 1809, Montreal's oldest public monument was raised there, Nelson's Column. In 1847, the square was renamed in honour of Jacques Cartier, the explorer who claimed Canada for France in 1535.

The broad, divided street slopes steeply downhill from Montreal City Hall and rue Notre-Dame to the waterfront and rue de la Commune. During the high tourist season, the street hosts many street artists and kiosks. During the Christmas season, the street is lined with lighted trees. At any time of year, one can find restaurants on both sides of the street and many more on the surrounding streets of Vieux Port, notably on Rue Saint-Paul.

It is a car-free zone in the summer. During the summer season, Jardin Nelson offers a garden restaurant on Place Jacques-Cartier. Other restaurants similarly offer classical Parisian-style "terraces" for taking a drink or dining in the open air. And on the other side of the place, the famous restaurant Saint-Amable (the oldest restaurant in town) welcomes Montreal celebrities and locals in a crooner jazz atmosphere.

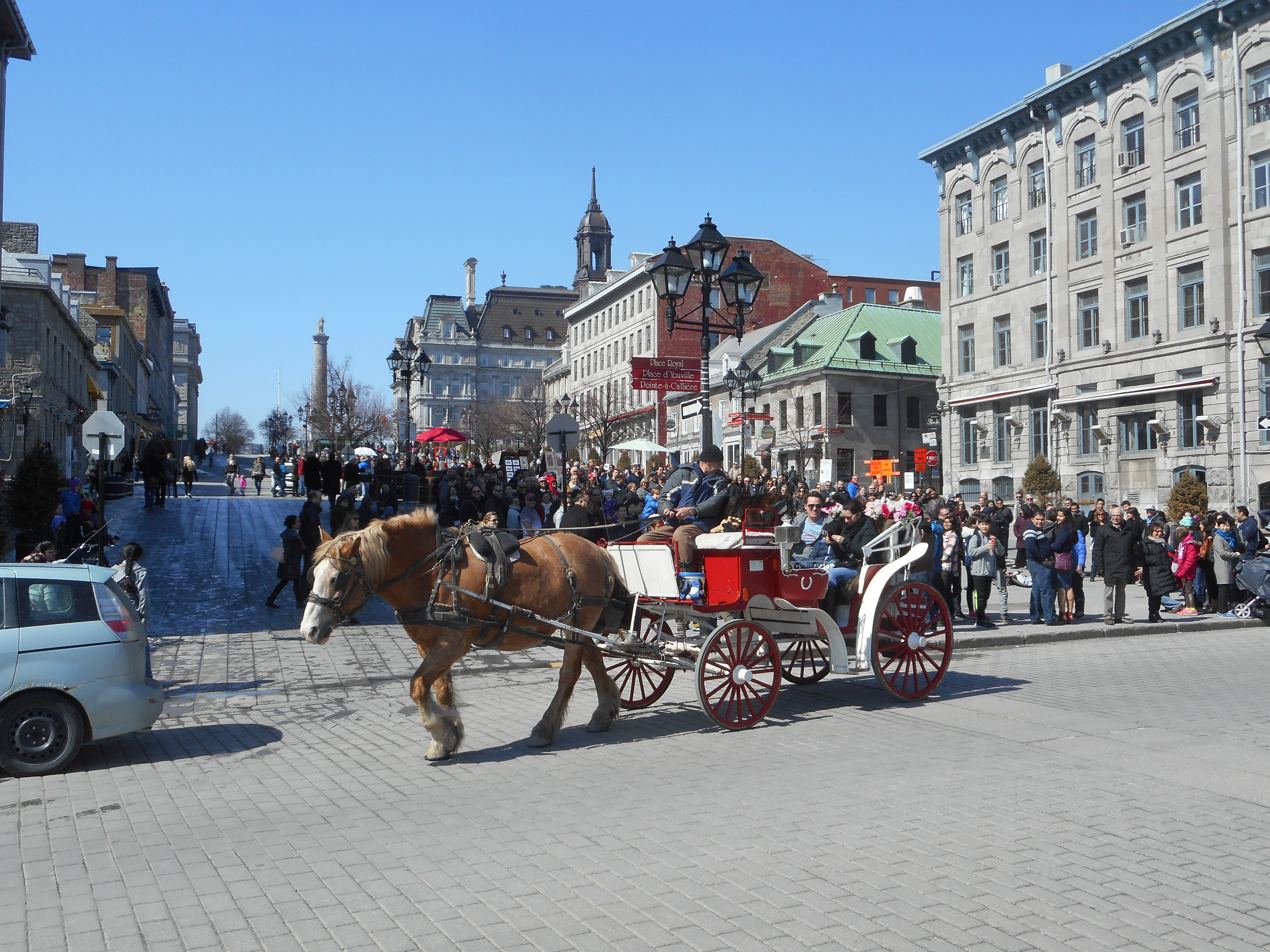
March 2016

Near Place Jacques-Cartier on rue de la Commune, an original piece of the wall of the old fortified city can still be seen in the basement restaurant of the Auberge du Vieux-Port. At the upper end of the Place stands Nelson's Column, built in memory of Admiral Horatio Nelson. The statue was removed in 1997 to preserve it from the weather, and was subsequently replaced with a copy.

== See also ==
- Montreal Metro: Champ de Mars station
