= Pierre Flynn =

Canadian singer-songwriter

- Born: 17 May 1954 (age 72); Quebec City, Quebec, Canada
- Website: https://pierreflynn.com/

Pierre Flynn (born 17 May 1954) is a Canadian singer-songwriter and keyboardist from Quebec. He was a part of Octobre from 1971 to 1982.

== Biography ==
Pierre Flynn was born on 17 May 1954 in Quebec City, Quebec, Canada.

While studying in CEGEP, Flynn was a member of the band Gladstone. In 1971, he founded Octobre, of which he wrote most of the songs. He then wrote songs for Louise Forestier ("Prince-Arthur") and for the films Caffè Italia (1985) and Les gens du fleuve (1985). He also wrote for musicals, dance troupes and for the theater of the Grand Cirque ordinaire. He was also keyboardist for Plume Latraverse and Offenbach in 1983. He wrote for Pauline Julien and Joe Bocan.

Flynn gave his first solo show first in 1984 at Club Soda in Montreal, then across Quebec in 1985; notably performing at the coffeehouse-theater La Licorne for three weekswith Réjean Bouchard. His first single, 'Possession', was released in 1984 and his first album Le Parfum du hasard was released in 1987. It won a Félix Award for best rock album and best arranger of the year.

Flynn then toured Quebec. His songs "Sur la route" and "Marcher tout seul" placed first on the Radio-Activité hit parade in 1988. He wrote the soundtrack for the documentary Un cirque en Amérique. His performance on the TV show Roch in 1989 was praised. Flynn gave a series of shows at Club Soda and Spectrum,and then took part in the revival of Octobre,before writing the hit "Dors Caroline" for Johanne Blouin.

He participated in the Francofolies of Montreal in 1991. In 1992, he received the CIEL/Raymond-Lévesque prize and gave a show across Quebec.

He made a comeback in 2015 with the album Sur la terre. He was nominated at the ADISQ Gala in 2015 and 2016. He gave a tour over three years in Quebec, New Brunswick and Switzerland.

In 2023, he gave the concert "Sur la route".

== Discography ==
Singles
Year	Title
1984	Possession/Instrumental
1987	Sur la route/Instrumental
1988	L’ennemi/Instrumental
1988	Possession (seconde version)
1988	Marcher tout seul
1989	Le retour
1989	Catalina
1989	Extrait
1991	Savoir aimer
1991	Qui nous dira
1992	Où est le vent

Albums
Year	Title
1987	Le parfum du hasard
1991	Jardins de Babylone
2015	Sur la terre
