= Merchants Textile Mill =

Coordinates: 45.4753°N 73.5802°W

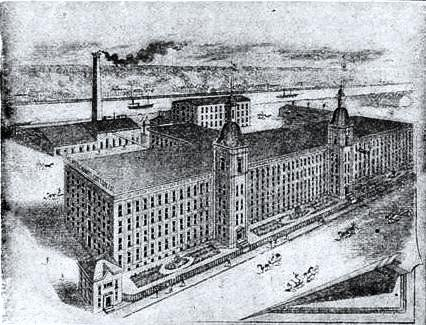
1905

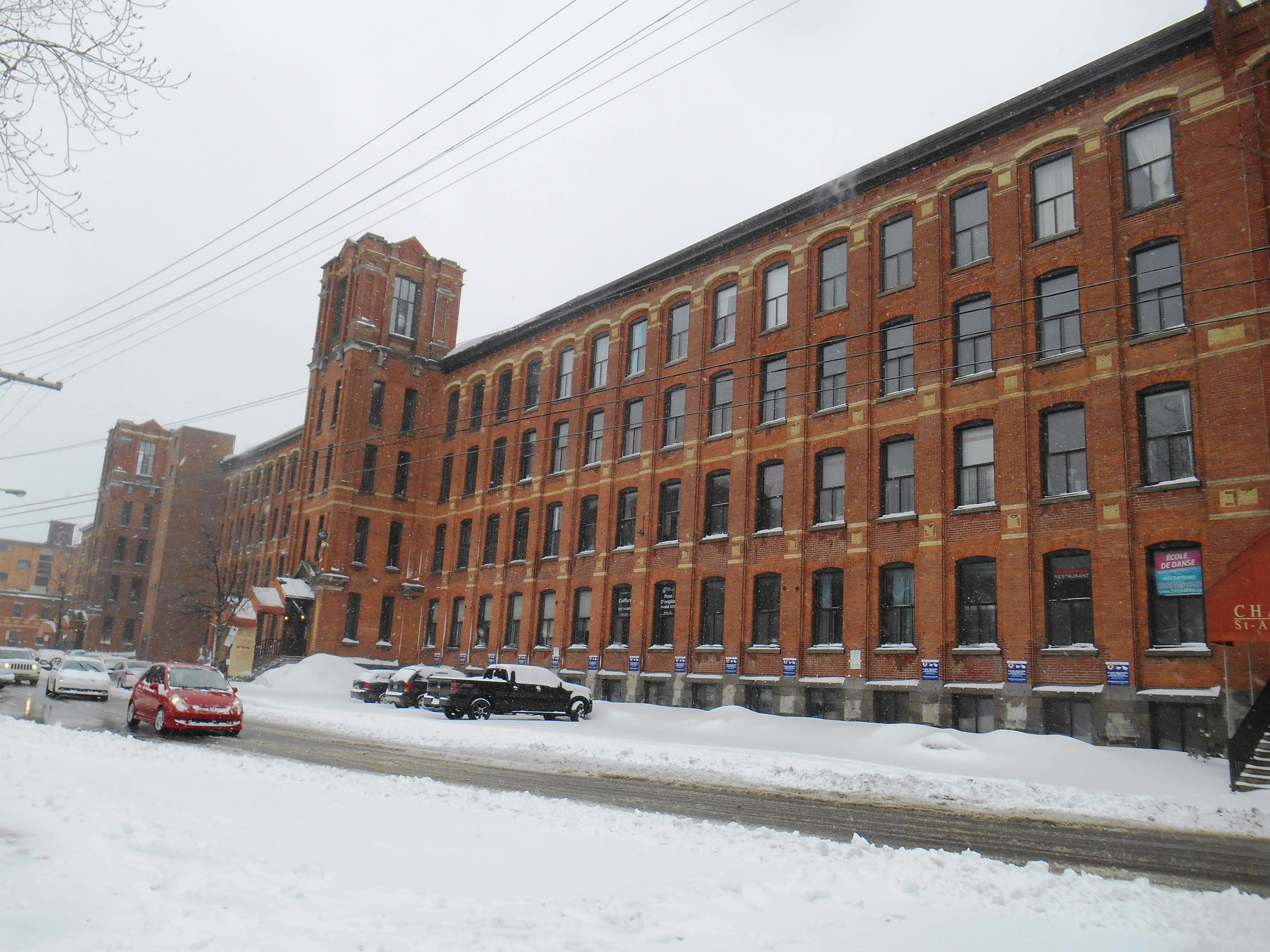

Merchants Textile Mill is an historic textile mill building in the Saint-Henri neighbourhood of Montréal, Quebec. From 1899 until at least the Second World War, it was the second largest textile mill in Canada. It is located at 3970-4035 Saint-Ambroise Street.

== See also ==
- List of National Historic Sites of Canada in Montreal
