= Sir George-Étienne Cartier National Historic Site =

Historic house museum in Old Montreal

Coordinates: 45°30′40″N 73°33′06″W

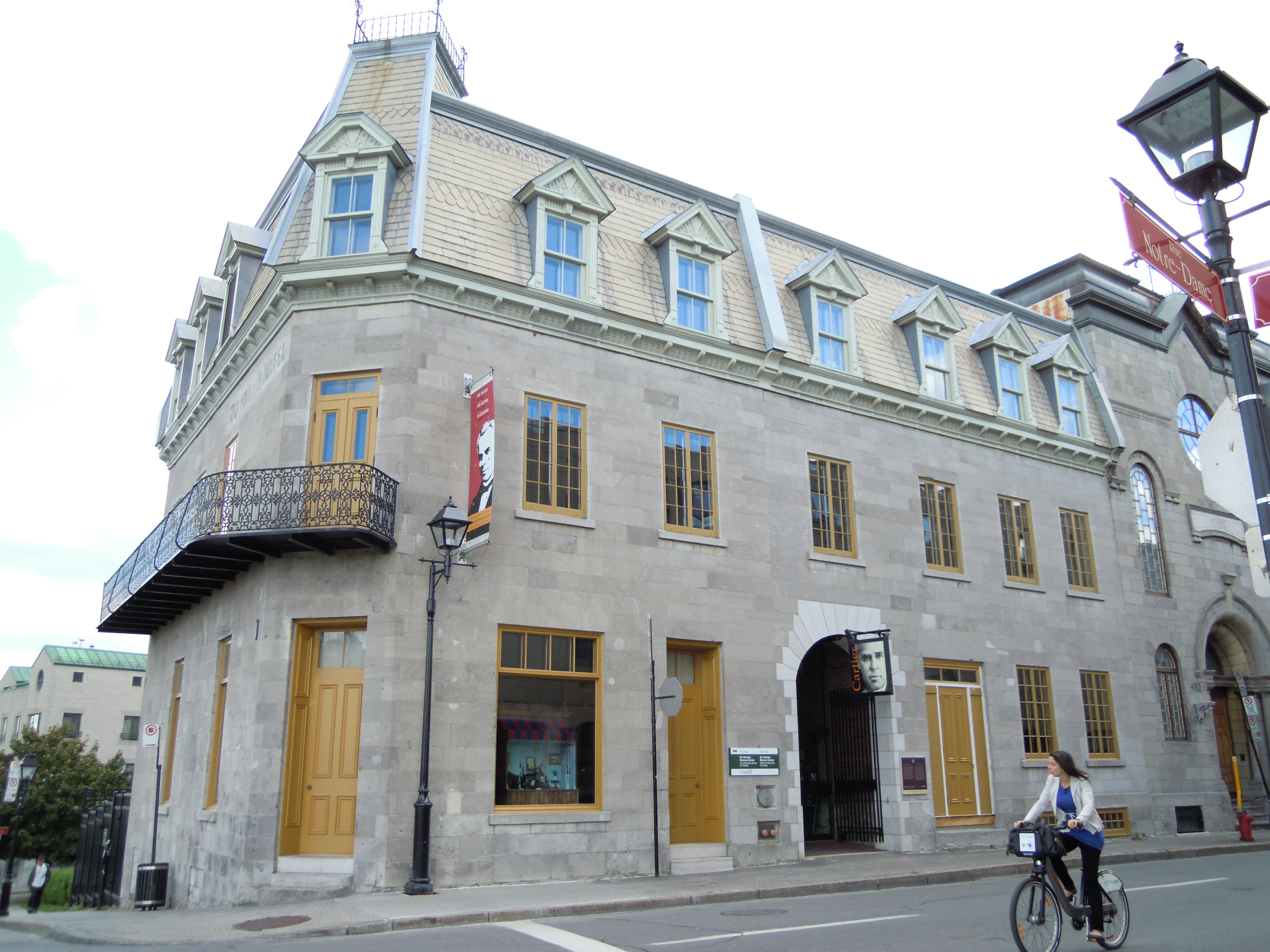
Sir George-Étienne Cartier National Historic Site.

The Sir George-Étienne Cartier National Historic Site is a historic house museum located in the Old Montreal district, of Montreal, Quebec, Canada. It commemorates the life and accomplishments of Sir George-Étienne Cartier. This reconstitution of the adjoining homes of the Cartier family features the architectural heritage left by the upper middle class of 19th-century Montreal, along with interpretive activities and theatrical performances.

== History ==
The two wings were built in 1837 as a residential home for an unknown owner and was later converted into a hotel from 1871 and was called the Grand Pacific Hotel from 1881-1884. Later it carried the names Dalhousie Hotel and Royal Hotel.

== Cartier home ==
Despite currently as a single dwelling, Cartier lived in what was two dwellings. During his early political career as Member of the Legislative Assembly of the Province of Canada he lived in the east wing from 1848 to 1854. He would then lived in the west wing from 1862 to 1872.

== Historic site ==
It was designated a National Historic Site of Canada in 1964.
