= Maison Cartier =

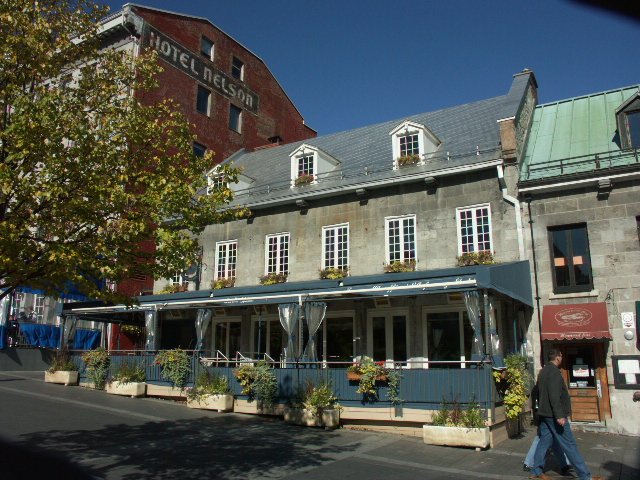
- Interactive map of the Maison Cartier area

General information
- Location: 407, place Jacques-Cartier; Montreal, Quebec; H2Y 3B1
- Coordinates: 45°30′29″N 73°33′09″W
- Current tenants: Jardin Nelson
- Construction started: 1812
- Completed: 1813

Design and construction
- Main contractor: Amable Amiot dit Villeneuve; Antoine Bouteiller

Website
- http://www.jardinnelson.com/en/

National Historic Site of Canada
- Official name: Maison Cartier National Historic Site of Canada
- Designated: 1982

Maison Cartier is a historic house in Montreal, Quebec, Canada. It is located on Place Jacques-Cartier in Old Montreal. It was designated as a National Historic Site of Canada on November 19, 1982.

It was constructed from 1812 to 1813 by mason Amable Amiot dit Villeneuve and carpenter Antoine Bouteiller. The walls, which are made of ashlar along with the dormers on the roof, are considered to be examples of Quebec's urban architecture in the early Nineteenth century. The first owners of the house were Louis Parthenais and Augustin Perrault.

The Maison Cartier was originally connected to the Nelson Hotel. Though it is located next to Montreal's oldest public monument - Nelson's Column - it was apparently named the Jardin Nelson for Wolfred Nelson, a Patriote in the Lower Canada Rebellion of 1837, and the ninth Mayor of Montreal. Today a restaurant operates in the building.
