= Outremont Theatre =

Cinema and performing arts building in Montreal, Quebec, Canada

- Théâtre Outremont
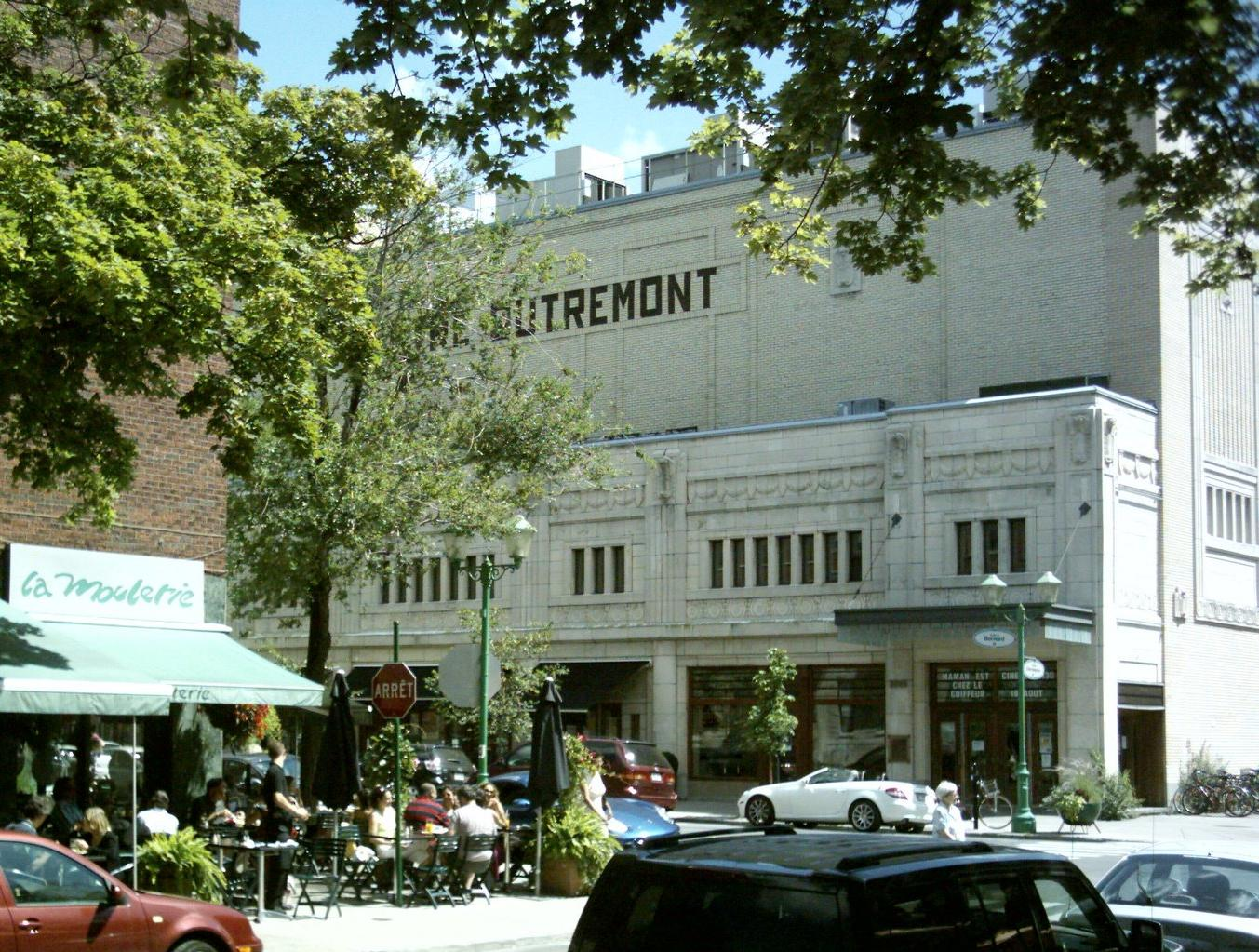
- Interactive map of Outremont Theatre
- Address: 1248, avenue Bernard Ouest
- Location: Montreal, Quebec, Canada
- Coordinates: 45.519944°N 73.609083°W
- Owner: City of Montreal
- Type: Atmospheric theatre
- Designation: National Historic Site of Canada

Construction
- Opened: 1929
- Reopened: 2001
- Architect: René Charbonneau

Website
- www.theatreoutremont.ca

National Historic Site of Canada
- Official name: Outremont Theatre National Historic Site of Canada
- Designated: 1993

Patrimoine culturel du Québec
- Type: Historic monument
- Designated: 1987 (municipal)

Outremont Theatre is a theatre in Montreal, Quebec, Canada, located on Bernard Avenue West in the borough of Outremont.

== History ==
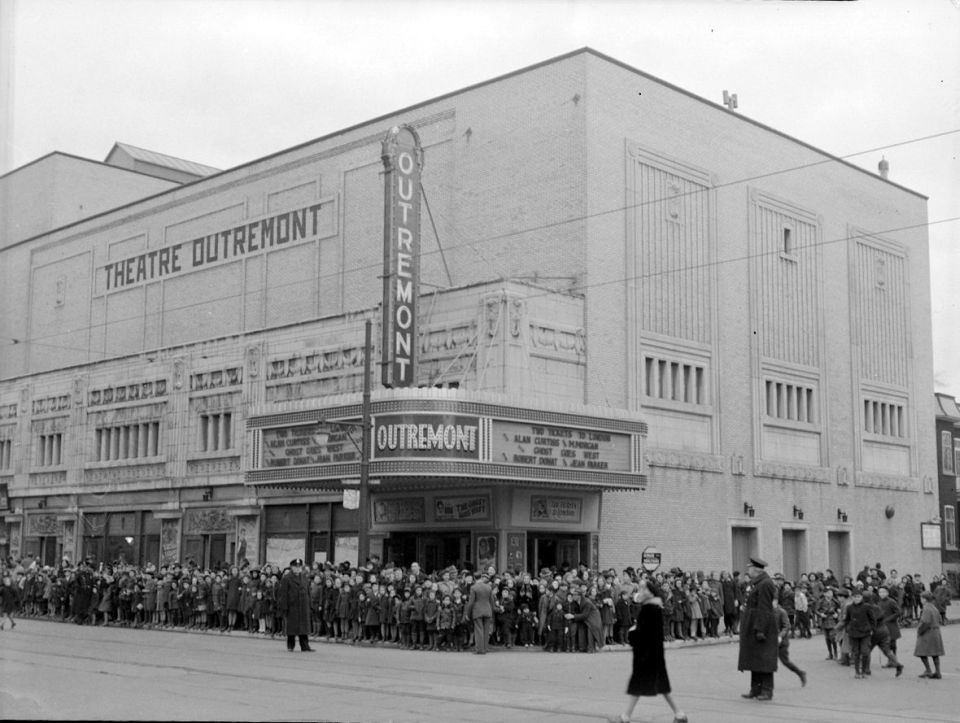
Theatre in 1943

The Outremont Theatre was built in 1928 based on plans by architect René Charbonneau. It opened the following year.

The theatre has operated both as a movie theatre and a concert hall.

Musicians who have performed at the Outremont Theatre include Pauline Julien, Louise Forestier, Félix Leclerc, Diane Dufresne, Paul Piché, Richard Séguin, Tom Waits and The Beautiful South.

The theatre closed its doors in the early 1990s. It was purchased by the city of Outremont in 1994, in order to restore the theatre after it had been recognized as a National Historic Site of Canada the previous year. Following the renovations, it reopened on March 20, 2001.

== Heritage Designation ==
The theatre was listed as a historic monument by the city of Outremont on June 29, 1987. It was designated a National Historic Site of Canada on November 20, 1993, and as a historic monument by the Répertoire du patrimoine culturel du Québec on June 28, 1994.
