= List of tallest buildings in Montreal =

Skyline of Montreal
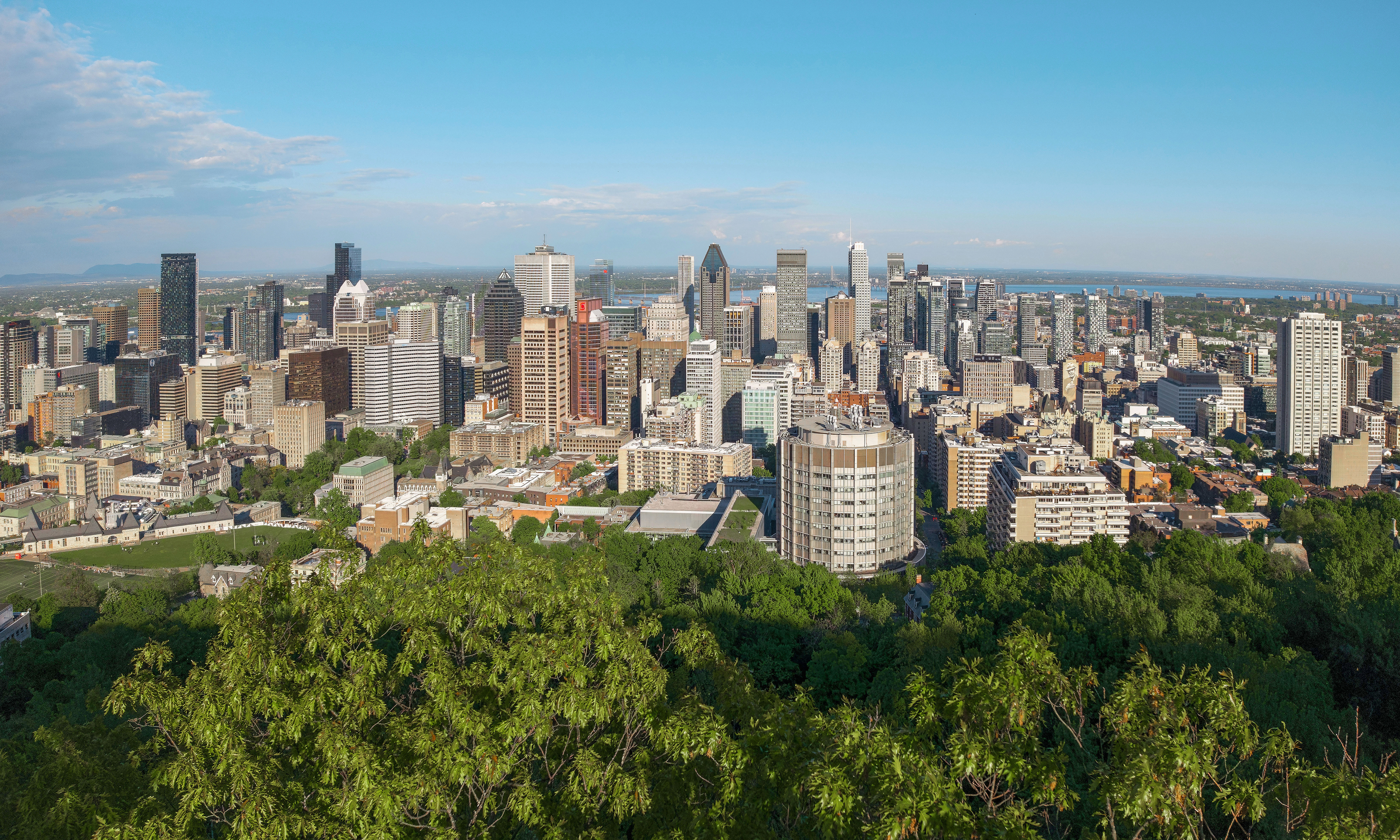
- Skyline of Montreal from Mount Royal in 2026
- Tallest building: 1250 Rene-Levesque (1992)
- Tallest building height: 226.5 m (743 ft)
- First 150 m+ building: Place Ville Marie (1962)

Number of tall buildings (2026)
- Taller than 100 m (328 ft): 73
- Taller than 150 m (492 ft): 18
- Taller than 200 m (656 ft): 6

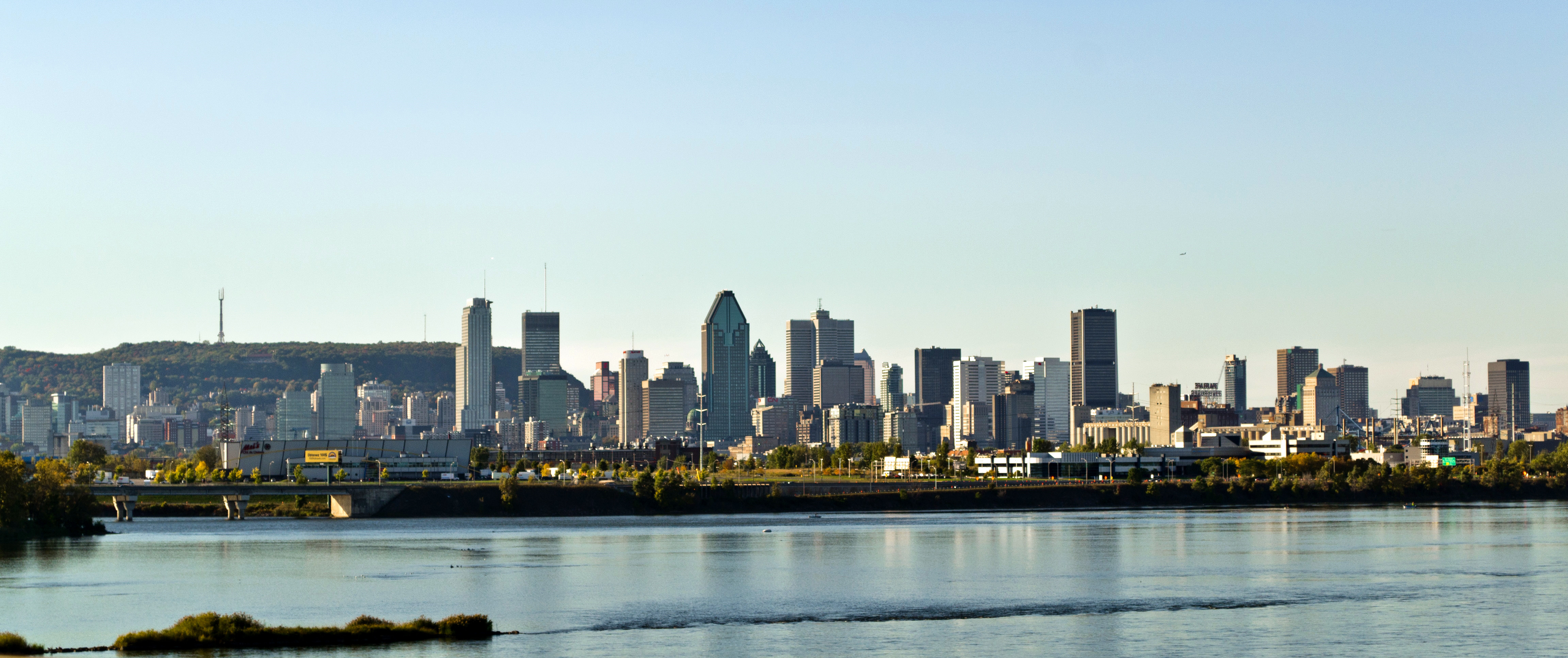
Montreal from the Champlain Bridge in 2013

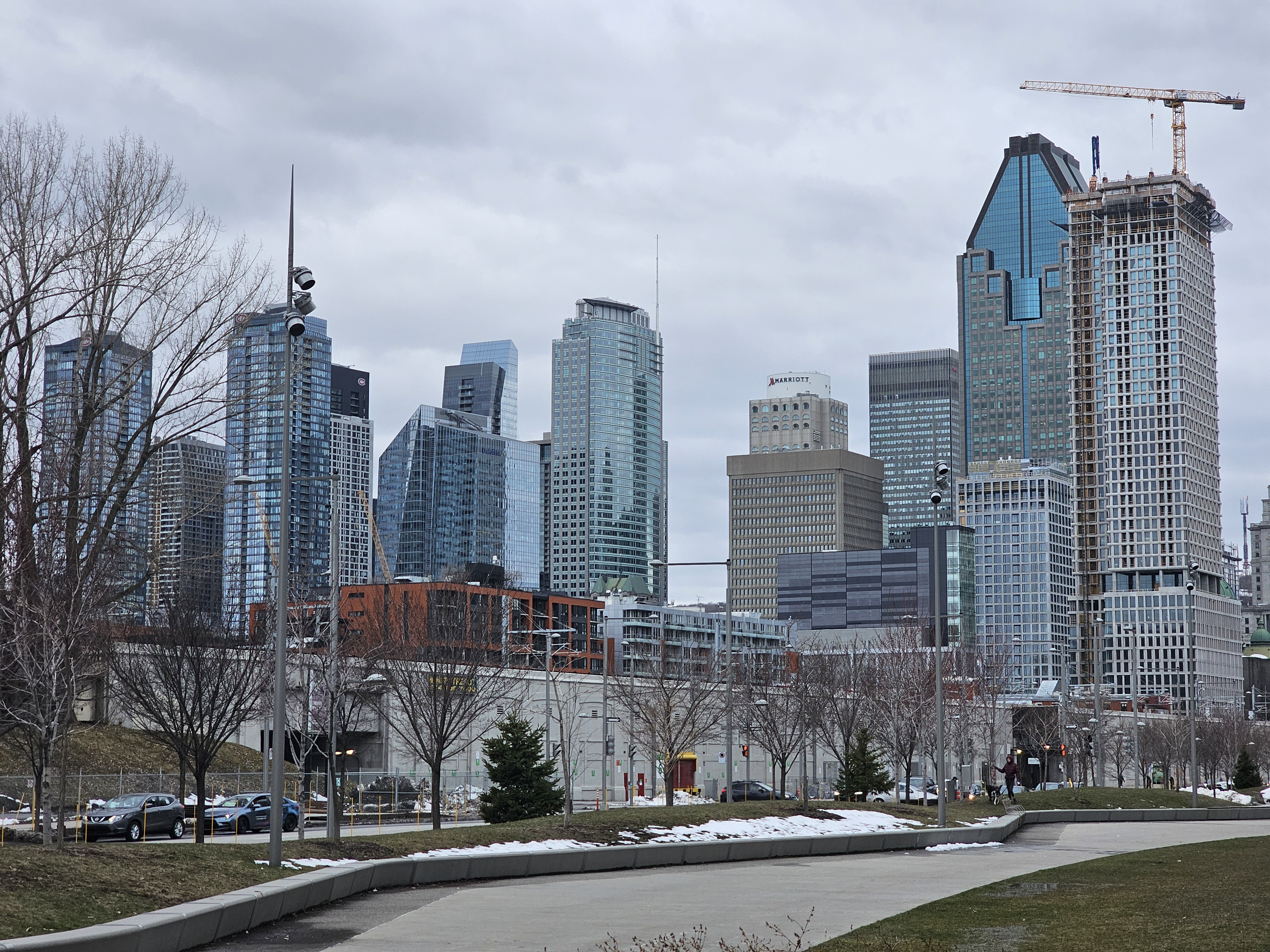
Skyscrapers from Wellington Street in 2024

Montreal's skyline is the largest in Quebec and one of the largest in Canada, with 73 buildings in the city that reach a height greater than 100 metres (328 ft), 18 of which are taller than 150 metres (490 ft) as of 2026. Montreal has the largest skyline and the tallest buildings in Canada east of Toronto, the only city in Canada with a greater population. Since 1992, municipal regulations have limited the height of any new buildings from exceeding the altitude of Mount Royal, which rises 232.5 m (763 ft) above mean sea level, combined with a maximum roof height of 200 m (656 ft) from ground level. The maximum roof height has since been removed from the latest 2050 Land Use and Mobility Plan adopted in 2025; the restriction on not surpassing the altitude of Mount Royal remains in effect.

The history of skyscrapers in Montreal began with the completion of the eight-storey New York Life Insurance Building in 1889. Following an early modest boom from the late 1920s to the early 1930s, Montreal's skyline was left unchanged until the early 1960s, when the construction of high-rises picked up again.

This second, larger boom, which lasted until the early 1990s, was dominated by commercial office towers, such as Tour de la Bourse, which was the tallest building in Canada from 1964 to 1969. While not a habitable building, the Montreal Tower is a notable landmark in the city. Part of the city's Olympic Stadium, it was planned to be built in time for the city's 1976 Summer Olympics, but ultimately opened in 1987. It is the tallest inclined structure in the world at 165 m (541 ft). The boom ended with the current two tallest buildings, 1000 de La Gauchetière and 1250 René-Lévesque, both of which inaugurated in 1992.

A third building boom would begin in the 2010s, with residential and mixed-use buildings making up an increasing share of new development. The downtown skyline expanded significantly, especially towards the southwest, around the Bell Centre. Notable additions include the three-tower Tour des Canadiens complex, built between 2013 and 2021, as well as Roccabella (2016) and L'Avenue (2020). The mid-2020s saw the completion of five new skyscrapers that approach the city's height limit of around 200 m: Victoria sur le Parc, Banque Nationale Headquarters, Maestria, 1 Square Phillips, and Skyla, reflecting a growing demand for vertical space. Between 2000 and 2025, Montreal has more than doubled the number of buildings taller than 100 m (328 ft), from 32 to 73.

Most of Montreal's tallest buildings are located in Downtown Montreal, forming the core of a continuous area of high-rises extending towards Shaughnessy Village to the southwest of downtown and Griffintown to the southeast. Both areas have seen increased high-rise development beginning in the 2010s. In addition, high-rises can be found along the coast of Nun's Island south of downtown, and recent developments on the island in the 2020s, such as Evolo X and Symphonia VIU, have exceeded a height of 100 m (330 ft). The Belvédère Kondiaronk lookout on Mount Royal is a popular viewpoint for the city's skyline.

== History ==
Number of buildings by height in Montreal by the end of each year. Click on the legend to toggle a specific height on or off. View chart definition.

=== 1900s–1950s ===
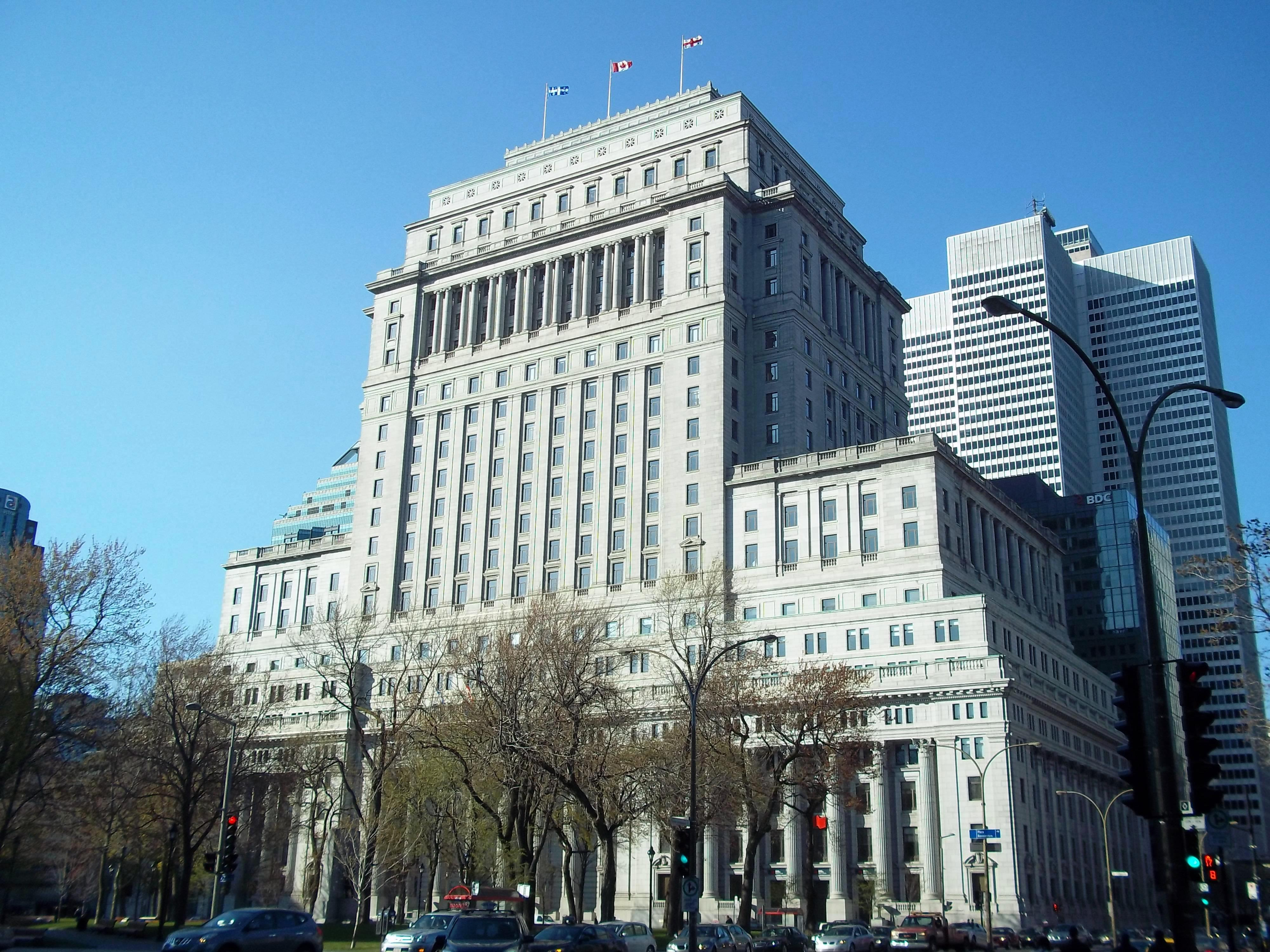
The Sun Life Building, with Place Ville Marie behind it to the right.

In the first half of the 20th century, Montreal was the largest city in Canada, as well as its economic centre. As a result, the city is home to many of Canada's earliest high-rises, featuring a variety of architectural styles. Montreal had many of Canada's tallest buildings, which only Toronto rivalled in height.The first high-rise in Montreal is considered to be New York Life Insurance Building in Old Montreal, the tallest commercial building in the city at the time of completion in 1889. Constructed in the Richardsonian Romanesque style for the New York Life Insurance Company, the building's Old Red Sandstone was imported from Dumfriesshire, Scotland. However, the city's tallest building overall was the Notre-Dame Basilica, a minor basilica built in 1865. Another early high-rise, also in Old Montreal, was the Renaissance Revival Canada Life Building, built in 1895.

A construction boom towards the mid-to-late 1920s, during the Roaring Twenties. The neoclassical Royal Bank Tower, upon completion in 1928, became the first building in the city to surpass the Notre-Dame Basilica with a height of 121 m (397 ft); it was the tallest building in Canada and all of the British Empire. The Art Deco Aldred Building, 96 m (315 ft) tall, was completed in 1930, with setbacks that allowed light onto the Place d'Armes square and evoked the cathedral-like massing of the adjacent Notre-Dame Basilica. The Bell Telephone Building, also 96 m tall, was completed in 1929, and contained the head offices of the Bell Telephone Company. The Royal Bank Tower would soon be ever so slightly eclipsed by the 122 m (400 ft) Sun Life Building in 1931. The 7-storey base of the skyscraper had been built by 1918, with the tower being added later.

After the end of the boom, brought about by the Great Depression, few high-rises would be added to the city for over two decades leaving the skyline largely unchanged until the early 1960s. One possible exception is the tower on the main campus of the Université de Montréal. Construction on the campus and the tower, to the west of Mount Royal, began in 1924 and was only completed in 1943. The 22-storey tower was designed with both Beaux Arts and Art Deco influences.

=== 1960s–1990s ===
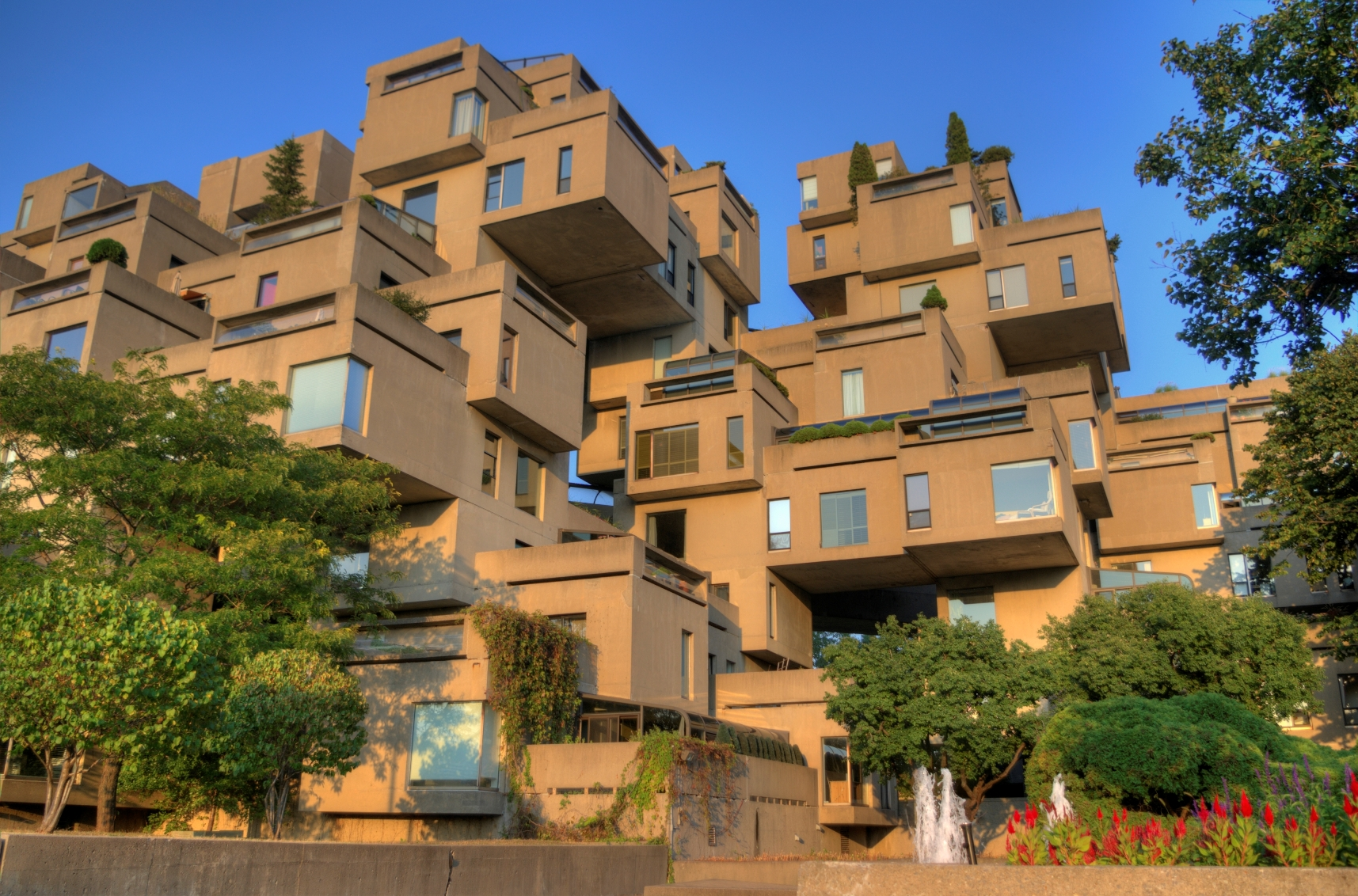
The interlocking forms of Habitat 67

A large building boom began in the early 1960s, whereupon many commercial skyscrapers were built in the city. The centre of commercial activity shifted from the historic Old Montreal to the core of today's Downtown Montreal. The first building to surpass the height of the Sun Life Building was CIBC Tower, a 187 m (614 ft) office tower that housed the Canadian Imperial Bank of Commerce. It would only hold the title of Montreal's tallest building very briefly, for it was soon overtaken by the cross-shaped Place Ville Marie in the same year. About three storeys of height was added to Place Ville Marie to ensure it would be taller than CIBC Tower. During the 1960s, Montreal had some of the tallest skyscrapers outside the United States, with the Place Ville Marie being the third tallest upon completion. Only two years after Place Ville Marie was built, Tour de la Bourse became the city's tallest building in 1964; it was also the tallest reinforced concrete building in the world until the completion of Lake Point Tower in Chicago. Like similar waves of construction in other Canadian cities such as Toronto or Vancouver, Montreal adapted the International style for most of its new towers during this period.

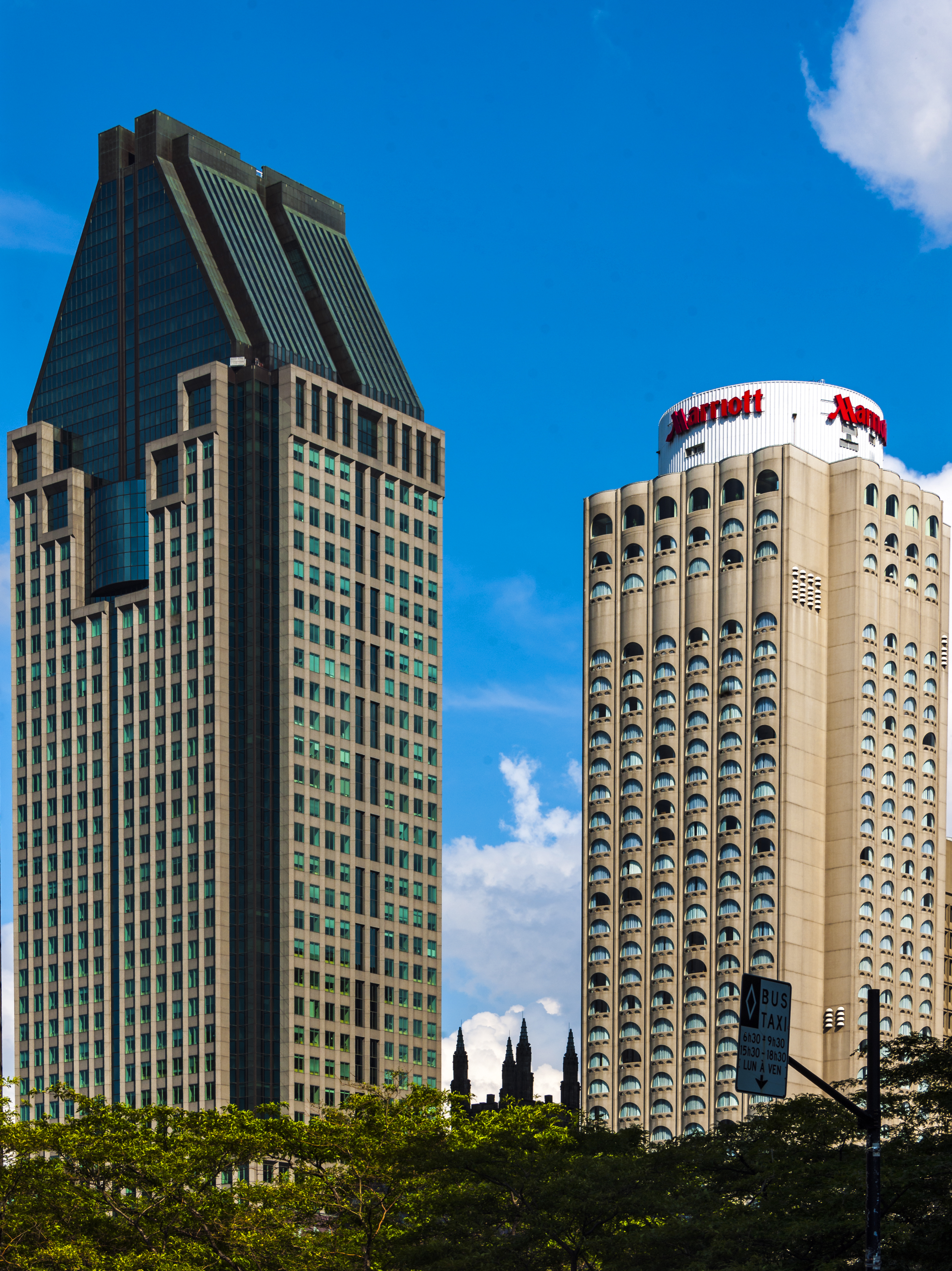
1000 de la Gauchetière (left) and the Château Champlain (right)

There were a few exceptions to the trend of office buildings, such as Château Champlain, a hotel skyscraper built in 1966 to accommodate visitors to Expo 67, the city's upcoming world's fair. It is notable for its distinctive arch-shaped windows. The Le Port-Royal Apartments at Golden Square Mile, on the western edge of downtown, was one of the city's earliest residential high-rises, completed in 1964 in the modernist style. While short compared to other high-rises built during the 1960s, the Habitat 67 housing complex, built in Cité du Havre for Expo 67, is recognized as a unique architectural landmark. Designed by Israeli-Canadian-American architect Moshe Safdie as his thesis project at McGill University, Habitat 67 was designed to integrate the benefits of suburban living within the density and economics of an apartment building. Its interlocking forms and landscape terraces have made it one of Montreal's most unique high-rises.

Montreal was selected as the host for the 1976 Summer Olympics in 1970, and work began in 1973 for the city's Olympic Stadium north of downtown. The stadium was to incorporate a 165 m (541 ft) tower, named Montreal Tower, that would be the tallest inclined structure in the world. However, the project was plagued by multiple issues, such as Montreal's brutal winters, and the tower would not be finished until 1987, 11 years after the games. The tower features an observatory, accessed via an inclined elevator, that offers visitors views of the Montreal skyline. Also built for the Olympics was the city's Olympic Village to house the games' athletes, consisting of two pyramid-shaped 23-storey high-rises. Similar to Montreal Tower, the Olympic Village suffered cost overruns.

The city's commercial building boom continued in the 1970s; notable developments include the four-building Complexe Desjardins (1975), which has a mall at its base, and Complexe Maisonneuve (1983). Later office towers from the mid-1980s adopted postmodernist architecture, such as KPMG Tower (1987), the Bell Media Tower (1988), and 1501 McGill College (1992). The boom would come to an end in 1992, with the completion of Montreal's two tallest buildings: 1000 de La Gauchetière and 1250 René-Lévesque. When measured by roof height, 1000 de La Gauchetière is the city's tallest building at 205 m (673 ft). If measured by architectural height, 1250 René-Lévesque is the taller of the two due to its spire, which brings it to a height of 226.5 m (743 ft).

By this point, Toronto had overtaken Montreal in urban population as well as economic importance, which was reflected in the heights of its tallest buildings. In 1992, Montreal adopted its first ever urban plan, prohibiting any building in the city from exceeding the altitude of Mount Royal. This equates to a height restriction of 232.5 m above mean sea level, effectively a height limit of about 200 m (656 ft) in Downtown Montreal, ensuring that 1000 de La Gauchetière and 1250 René-Lévesque would retain their positions as Montreal's two tallest buildings indefinitely.

=== 2000s–present ===
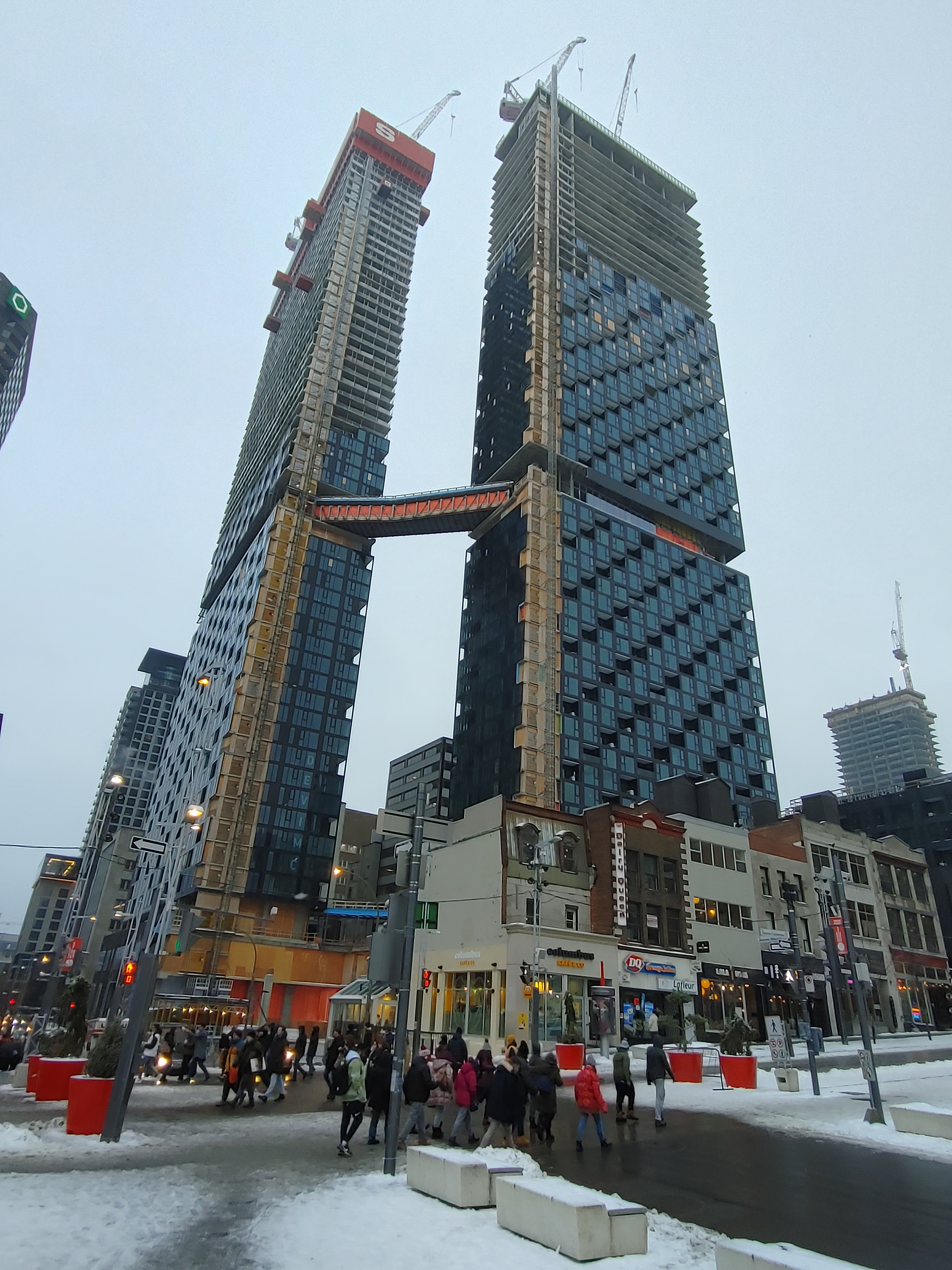
Maestria Condominiums under construction in 2023

High-rise development slowed down significantly in the 1990s, until the start of another construction boom in the late 2000s. The only building taller than 100 m (328) to appear between this period was the taller of the two-tower E-Commerce Place complex (Cité du commerce électronique, or CCE in French). Completed in 2003, it was part of a program from the Quebecois government to promote jobs in information technology, with the creation of the Cité du Multimédia neighbourhood. Construction of new high-rises had returned earnestly by the 2010s, with many residential and mixed-use buildings being built downtown, such as Altitude Montreal (2013), Tour Air Canada (2014), and Tom Condos (2018), densifying the existing skyline.

In particular, a lot of new construction has occurred around the Bell Centre, expanding the core of the skyline southwest. This included the three-tower Tour des Canadiens complex, built between 2013 and 2021, and named after the Montreal Canadiens hockey team based at the Bell Centre; L'Avenue, a mixed-use skyscraper completed in 2020; and Deloitte Tower, the tallest office tower built in the city in the 2010s. Deloitte Tower was the city's first privately owned and financed commercial office tower to be built in more than 20 years. The building boom approached the maximum height allowed under the city's height restrictions by the 2020s, with four new skyscrapers reaching this limit. This includes the residential towers of Victoria sur le Parc, Maestria, 1 Square Phillips, and Skyla, as well as the tallest office building built after the 1990s, Banque Nationale Headquarters. The skyscraper became the new headquarters of the National Bank of Canada upon completion. All five skyscrapers were completed between 2024 and 2025.

The area of Shaughnessy Village further southwest has seen a recent increase in height with the two-tower 27-storey Alexander Appartements and EstWest Condos, and especially 1111 Atwater, the first building in the area to pass 100 m (328 ft). All of those developments were completed between 2021 and 2022. The neighbourhood of Griffintown, formerly industrial land, has been undergoing redevelopment since the 2010s, transforming it into a livable, residential high-rise neighbourhood. To the north of downtown, the Centre hospitalier de l'Université de Montréal (CHUM) completed a new hospital complex in 2021. Measuring 112 m (368 ft) tall, it is Montreal's tallest health building, and the only one to exceed 100 m (328 ft).

Residential high-rises have been built on Nun's Island since the 1980s, but the 2010s saw a noted increase in the height of new buildings on the island, especially on the northern tip and the southern tip of the island, which is reclaimed land. The towers on the northern tip form the Évolo development; the tallest building, Évolo X, was built in 2020 at a height of 120 m (394 ft). Likewise, the high-rises on the southern tip all begin with "Symphonia"; the tallest, Symphonia VIU, became the tallest building in the city outside of downtown upon completion in 2024. Altogether, there are three buildings on Nun's Island that surpass 100 m (328 ft). A fourth, Symphonia MUZ, is planned.

During Montreal's mayoral election in 2021, former mayor Denis Coderre had suggested to abolish Montreal's height limit regarding Mount Royal in order to combat urban sprawl and increase the supply of new housing. This prompted a debate on the benefits and costs of removing the height limit; ultimately, Coderre was not elected, and the restriction remains today.

== Cityscape ==
A panoramic shot of Montreal from Mount Royal in 2019.

== Map of tallest buildings ==
The following map shows the location of buildings in Downtown Montreal that are taller than 100 m (328 ft). Each marker is coloured by the decade of the building's completion. There are six buildings, outside of a total of 71, that are located outside the scope of the map and hence are not visible. These are: 1111 Atwater in Shaughnessy Village; CHUM and Le Maison de Radio-Canada to the north of downtown; and Evolo X, Symphonia POP, and Symphonia VUE on Nun's Island.

Buildings taller than 100 m (328 ft) in Montreal. An asterisk (*) next to the name of the building indicates it is located outside the map.
- 1950s and before
- 1960s
- 1970s
- 1980s
- 1990s
- 2000s
- 2010s
- 2020s
1 1250 René-Lévesque
2 1000 de La Gauchetière
3 Maestria Tour B
4 Victoria sur le Parc
5 Banque Nationale Headquarters
6 Skyla
7 1 Square Phillips
8 Tour de la Bourse
9 Place Ville-Marie
10 Maestria Tour A
11 L'Avenue
12 CIBC Tower
13 Tour des Canadiens 3
14 Tour des Canadiens 2
15 Tour des Canadiens
16 1501 McGill College
17 Livmore Ville-Marie II
18 Complexe Desjardins South Tower
19 Le George
20 Solstice Montréal
21 Roccabella (East Tower)
22 Roccabella (West Tower)
23 Icône
24 KPMG Tower
25 Symphonia VIU*
26 Marriott Château Champlain
27 Le V / Courtyard Marriott Hotel
28 Telus Tower
29 500 Place D'Armes
30 Deloitte Tower
31 Complexe Desjardins East Tower
32 Scotia Tower
33 National Bank Tower
34 700 de la Gauchetière
35 1000 Sherbrooke West
36 Terminal Tower
37 Bell Media Tower
38 Altitude Montreal
39 Sun Life Building
40 Le Port-Royal
41 Tom Condos
42 Tour de la Banque Royale
43 Holiday Inn Montréal Centre-Ville West
44 Humaniti Montréal
45 YUL Tower 1
46 Maison Manuvie
47 628 Saint-Jacques
48 Evolo X*
49 YUL Tower 2
50 1111 Atwater*
51 Tour Air Canada
52 Appartements Dorchester II
53 Livmore Ville-Marie I
54 IVY Montréal + Hôtel Honeyrose
55 Quinzecent
56 E-Commerce Place
57 Le Centre Sheraton
58 Le Peterson
59 Place du Canada
60 AC Hotel / Allegra Montreal
61 400 Sherbrooke West
62 CHUM*
63 Edifice Hydro Quebec
64 500 Boulevard René-Lévesque Ouest
65 Complexe Desjardins, North Tower
66 Evo Montréal
67 Symphonia POP*
68 Tour Intact
69 Hotel Omni Montreal
70 Place Sherbrooke
71 1100 René-Levesque Boulevard
72 Le Maison de Radio-Canada*
73 Le Crystal

== Tallest buildings ==
This list ranks buildings in Montreal that stand at least 100 m (328 ft) tall as of 2026, based on CTBUH height measurement standards. This includes spires and architectural details but does not include antenna masts. Freestanding observation and/or telecommunication towers, while not habitable buildings, are included for comparison purposes; they are not ranked. One such tower is the Tour de Montréal.

Was the tallest building in Montreal upon completion

Rank	Name	Image	Location	Height m (ft)	Floors	Year	Purpose	Notes
1	1250 René-Lévesque		45°29′49″N 73°34′13″W	226.5 (743)	47	1992	Office	Originally known as the IBM-Marathon Tower. The roof height is 199 m. Tallest building in Montreal since 1992. Tallest building completed in Montreal in the 1990s.
2	1000 de La Gauchetière	1000 de La Gauchetière	45°29′54″N 73°33′59″W	205 (673)	51	1992	Office	Tallest building in Montreal by roof height. It reaches the maximum roof height allowed by the city within viewing distance of the Mount Royal look off point.
3	Maestria Tour B		45°30′23″N 73°33′55″W	202 (663)	61	2025	Residential	Tallest twin towers in Montreal, alongside Maestria Tour A.
4	Victoria sur le Parc		45°30′00″N 73°33′41″W	200 (656)	58	2024	Residential	Tallest residential building in Montreal and in Canada east of Toronto. So far, the tallest building completed in Montreal during the 2020s.
5	Banque Nationale Headquarters		45°29′57″N 73°33′42″W	200 (656)	40	2024	Office	
6	Moxy Hotel / Skyla		45°29′52″N 73°33′48″W	200 (656)	63	2025	Mixed-use	Mixed-use residential and hotel skyscraper. Also known by its street address, 900 Saint-Jacques.
7	1 Square Phillips		45°30′15″N 73°34′00″W	198 (650)	61	2025	Residential	
8	Tour de la Bourse	Tour de la Bourse	45°30′02″N 73°33′42″W	190 (620)	47	1964	Office	The tallest building in Canada until completion of the Toronto-Dominion Bank Tower in Toronto. The tallest reinforced concrete building in the world until the completion of Lake Point Tower in Chicago. The tallest building constructed in Montreal in the 1960s. Tallest building in Montreal from 1964 to 1992; tallest building completed in Montreal in the 1960s.
9	Place Ville-Marie	Place Ville-Marie	45°30′05″N 73°34′06″W	188 (617)	47	1962	Office	The tallest building in Canada until completion of the Tour de la Bourse. Briefly the tallest building in Montreal from 1962 to 1964.
10	Maestria Tour A		45°30′23″N 73°33′58″W	184.7 (606)	58	2025	Residential	Tallest twin towers in Montreal, alongside Maestria Tour B.
11	L'Avenue	L/Avenue	45°29′47″N 73°34′14″W	184.4 (605)	50	2017	Mixed-use	Mixed-use office and residential building. Tallest building completed in Montreal in the 2010s.
12	CIBC Tower	CIBC Tower	45°29′55″N 73°34′16″W	184 (604)	45	1962	Office	With its antenna included it measures 225 m (738 ft). The tallest building in Canada and the whole British Commonwealth when completed in 1962. Surpassed within a year by Place Ville-Marie.
13	Tour des Canadiens 3	Tour des Canadiens 3	45°29′43″N 73°34′07″W	168 (551)	52	2022	Residential	
14	Tour des Canadiens 2	Tour des Canadiens 2	45°29′45″N 73°34′04″W	168 (551)	52	2019	Residential	
15	Tour des Canadiens	Tour des Canadiens	45°29′45″N 73°34′13″W	167 (548)	49	2016	Residential	
N/A	Tour de Montréal	Tour de Montréal	45°33′36″N 73°33′09″W	165 (541)	20	1987	Sports	The Tour de Montréal is the tallest inclined tower in the world. Not a habitable building; included for comparison purposes.
16	1501 McGill College	1501 McGill College	45°30′09″N 73°34′16″W	158 (518)	36	1992	Office	
17	Livmore Ville-Marie II		45°30′19″N 73°33′55″W	156 (512)	45	2025	Residential	The taller of the two-tower Livmore Ville-Marie development.
18	Complexe Desjardins South Tower	Complexe Desjardins South	45°30′25″N 73°33′51″W	152 (499)	40	1976	Office	The tallest building completed in Montreal in the 1970s.
19	Le George	–	45°29′43″N 73°34′17″W	149 (489)	45	2024	Residential	
20	Solstice Montréal	–	45°29′45″N 73°34′16″W	147.5 (484)	44	2023	Residential	
21	Roccabella (East Tower)	Roccabella Drummond	45°29′49″N 73°34′17″W	147 (482)	40	2016	Residential	Also known as Roccabella (Tour Drummond) or Le Roccabella I.
22	Roccabella (West Tower)	Roccabella De la Montagne	45°29′48″N 73°34′18″W	147 (482)	40	2018	Residential	Also known as Roccabella (Tour de la Montagne) or Le Roccabella II.
23	Icône	Icône	45°29′49″N 73°34′22″W	146 (479)	39	2017	Residential	Also known as Icône Condos.
24	KPMG Tower	KPMG Tower	45°30′15″N 73°34′15″W	146 (479)	34	1987	Office	Originally known as Maison des Coopérants and later as Place de la Cathédrale. Tallest building completed in Montreal in the 1980s.
25	Symphonia VIU		45°26′48″N 73°33′32″W	145 (476)	43	2024	Residential	Tallest building outside of Downtown.
26	Marriott Château Champlain	Marriott Château Champlain	45°29′51″N 73°34′02″W	139 (454)	36	1967	Hotel	Tallest hotel in Montreal.
27	Le V / Courtyard Marriott Hotel	Le V	45°30′20″N 73°33′51″W	138 (453)	40	2014	Mixed-use	Mixed-use residential and hotel building.
28	Telus Tower	Telus Tower	45°30′07″N 73°33′59″W	136 (445)	34	1962	Office	Originally known as CIL House.
29	500 Place D'Armes	Le Tour de la Banque Nationale	45°30′16″N 73°33′28″W	133 (435)	32	1968	Office	Originally known as Tour Banque Canadienne Nationale.
30	Deloitte Tower	The Deloitte Tower	45°29′47″N 73°34′05″W	133 (435)	26	2015	Office	
31	Complexe Desjardins East Tower	Complexe Desjardins Tour Est	45°30′27″N 73°33′49″W	130 (427)	32	1976	Office	
32	Scotia Tower	Scotia Tower	45°30′08″N 73°34′30″W	128 (420)	29	1990	Office	
33	National Bank Tower		45°30′07″N 73°33′50″W	128 (420)	28	1983	Office	National Bank Tower and 700 de la Gauchetière were the tallest twin office towers in Montreal until the completion of the Roccabella East and West towers.
34	700 de la Gauchetière		45°30′03″N 73°33′52″W	128 (420)	28	1983	Office	Le 700 de la Gauchetière and Tour de la Banque Nationale were the tallest twin office towers in Montreal until the completion of the Roccabella East and West towers. Previously known as Bell Canada Tower.
35	1000 Sherbrooke West		45°30′10″N 73°34′31″W	128 (420)	28	1974	Office	Also known as the Centre Mont-Royal.
36	Terminal Tower		45°30′04″N 73°34′03″W	125 (410)	30	1966	Office	Also known as Le 800 René-Lévesque.
37	Bell Media Tower	Bell Media Tower	45°30′08″N 73°34′22″W	125 (410)	30	1988	Office	Originally known as Montreal Trust Place and Maison Astral.
38	Altitude Montreal	Altitude Montreal	45°30′10″N 73°34′07″W	124 (407)	33	2013	Residential	Was the tallest residential building in Canada east of Toronto until 2016.
39	Sun Life Building	Sun Life Building	45°30′00″N 73°34′12″W	122 (400)	26	1931	Office	The tallest building in Montreal from 1931 until the completion of the CIBC Tower in 1962. The tallest building in the city completed prior to the 1960s. Tallest building completed in Montreal in the 1930s.
40	Le Port-Royal	Le Port Royal	45°29′52″N 73°34′52″W	122 (400)	33	1964	Residential	Was the highest residential building in Canada east of Toronto until the completion of Altitude Montreal in 2013.
41	Tom Condos	Tom Condos	45°30′10″N 73°34′04″W	122 (400)	40	2018	Residential	
42	Tour de la Banque Royale		45°30′08″N 73°33′33″W	121 (397)	22	1928	Office	Tallest building in Montreal from 1928 to 1931. Tallest building completed in Montreal in the 1920s.
43	Holiday Inn Montréal Centre-Ville West		45°29′43″N 73°34′22″W	120 (394)	40	2017	Mixed-use	Mixed-use residential and hotel building.
44	Humaniti Montréal		45°30′14″N 73°33′45″W	120 (394)	39	2020	Mixed-use	Mixed-use office, residential, and hotel building.
45	YUL Tower 1		45°29′41″N 73°34′26″W	120 (394)	38	2018	Residential	
46	Maison Manuvie		45°30′06″N 73°34′24″W	120 (394)	27	2017	Office	
47	628 Saint-Jacques		45°30′02″N 73°33′39″W	120 (394)	35	2021	Residential	
48	Evolo X		45°28′28″N 73°32′20″W	120 (394)	36	2021	Residential	
49	YUL Tower 2	–	45°29′42″N 73°34′24″W	120 (394)	38	2021	Residential	
50	1111 Atwater	–	45°29′20″N 73°35′00″W	120 (394)	37	2022	Residential	
51	Tour Air Canada		45°30′08″N 73°33′48″W	120 (394)	35	2014	Mixed-use	Formerly known as Altoria. Mixed-use office and residential building.
52	Appartements Dorchester II	–	45°29′40″N 73°34′30″W	120 (394)	37	2022	Residential	
53	Livmore Ville-Marie I		45°30′19″N 73°33′56″W	120 (394)	36	2022	Residential	The shorter of the two-tower Livmore Ville-Marie development.
54	IVY Montréal + Hôtel Honeyrose	–	45°30′25″N 73°34′11″W	120 (394)	35	2023	Mixed-use	Mixed-use hotel and residential building.
55	Quinzecent		45°29′38″N 73°34′28″W	120 (394)	36	2024	Residential	
56	E-Commerce Place		45°29′46″N 73°34′20″W	118.8 (390)	27	2003	Office	Also known by its French name, Cité du Commerce Électronique.
57	Le Centre Sheraton		45°29′53″N 73°34′18″W	117.6 (386)	38	1982	Hotel	Originally planned to open in 1976 as a Holiday Inn, in time for the 1976 Olympics.
58	Le Peterson		45°30′26″N 73°34′15″W	115.2 (378)	34	2017	Residential	
59	Place du Canada		45°29′51″N 73°34′00″W	113 (371)	27	1967	Office	
60	AC Hotel / Allegra Montreal		45°30′21″N 73°33′50″W	113 (371)	34	2018	Mixed-use	Mixed-use hotel and residential building.
61	400 Sherbrooke West		45°30′27″N 73°34′17″W	112.5 (369)	37	2009	Mixed	Mixed-use residential and hotel building, with a Hilton Garden Inn.
62	CHUM		45°30′42″N 73°33′26″W	112.1 (368)	22	2021	Health	Stands for the Centre Hospitalier de l`Université de Montréal (University of Montreal Health Centre) which constructued a new administrative and operational centre in 2021.
63	Edifice Hydro Quebec		45°30′30″N 73°33′45″W	110 (361)	27	1962	Office	Also known as the Édifice Jean-Lesage.
64	500 Boulevard René-Lévesque Ouest		45°30′11″N 73°33′56″W	110 (361)	26	1983	Office	
65	Complexe Desjardins, North Tower		45°30′29″N 73°33′52″W	108 (354)	27	1976	Office	
66	Evo Montreál		45°30′00″N 73°33′45″W	107 (349)	28	1976	Residential	Formerly the Delta Centre Ville Hotel, which closed in 2013.
67	Symphonia POP		45°26′58″N 73°33′40″W	105.5 (346)	34	2021	Residential	
68	Tour Intact		45°30′15″N 73°34′21″W	105.5 (346)	26	1973	Office	Also known as Le 2020.
69	Hotel Omni Montreal		45°30′07″N 73°34′34″W	104 (341)	31	1976	Hotel	
70	Place Sherbrooke		45°30′08″N 73°34′32″W	104 (341)	26	1976	Office	
71	1100 René-Levesque Boulevard		45°29′53″N 73°34′13″W	102 (335)	27	1986	Office	
72	Le Maison de Radio-Canada		45°31′05″N 73°33′04″W	101.2 (332)	24	1973	Office	
73	Le Crystal		45°29′48″N 73°34′22″W	101 (331)	26	2008	Mixed-use	Mixed-use hotel and residential building.

== Tallest under construction or proposed ==
=== Under construction ===
The following table ranks high-rises that are under construction in Montreal that are expected to be at least 100 m (328 ft) tall as of 2026, based on standard height measurement. The “Year” column indicates the expected year of completion. Buildings that are on hold are not included. A dash "–" indicates information is unknown or not publicly available. No new skyscrapers in Montreal can exceed the height limit of 200 m (656 ft) as per municipal regulations.

Name	Height m (ft)	Floors	Year	Notes
1050 de la Montagne	128 (420)	38	–	
MAA Condominiums	120 (394)	33	2026	
Trifecta (750 Peel)	120 (394)	35	2026	

=== Proposed ===
The following table ranks proposed and approved high-rises in Montreal that are expected to be at least 100 m (328 ft) tall as of 2026, based on standard height measurement. The “Year” column indicates the expected year of completion. A dash "–" indicates information is unknown or not publicly available.

Name	Height m (ft)	Floors	Year	Year proposed	Notes
895 de la Gauchetière Tour 1	200 (656)	–	–	2020	
895 de la Gauchetière Tour 2	200 (656)	–	–	2020	
Symphonia MUZ	–	40	–	2023	
1025 Lucien L'Allier	128 (420)	36	–	2025	
2050 rue Stanley	120 (394)	40	–	2021	
450 Sherbrooke Ouest	120 (394)	34	–	2024	
Le Montfort	120 (394)	36	–	2021	
1600 René-Lévesque O.	119.2 (391)	35	–	2023	

== Timeline of tallest buildings ==
This lists buildings that once held the title of tallest building in Montreal.

Name	Image	Street address	Years as tallest	No. of years as tallest	Height m (ft)	Floors
Notre Dame Basilica		110 Notre-Dame Street West	1829–1928	99 years	69 (226)	7
Royal Bank Building		360 Saint Jacques Street West	1928–1931	3 years	121 (397)	22
Sun Life Building	Sun Life Building	1155 Metcalfe Street	1931–1962	31 years	122 (400)	26
CIBC Tower	CIBC Tower	1155 René Lévesque Boulevard West	1962	<1 year	187 (614)	45
Place Ville Marie	Place Ville-Marie	1 Place Ville-Marie	1962–1964	2 years	188 (617)	47
Tour de la Bourse	Tour de la Bourse	800 Victoria Square	1964–1992	28 years	194 (637)	47
1250 René-Lévesque		1250 René-Lévesque Boulevard	1992–present	32 years (current)	226.5 (743)	51

== See also ==
- List of tallest buildings in Canada
- List of tallest buildings in Quebec
- Architecture of Montreal
