= NCK (disambiguation) =

NCK is Newton Chambers and Co Ltd. of Sheffield, England.

NCK may also refer to:

- Nicolet Chartrand Knoll, a Canadian engineering and consulting firm; structural engineer for Altitude Montreal
- NCK1, the non-catalytic region of tyrosine kinase adaptor protein 1
- National Centre for Knowledge on Men's Violence against Women, abbreviated NCK, a Swedish research and knowledge centre
- Binomial coefficient, abbreviated nCk (n choose k)
- Network Control Key, used for unlocking mobile phones and modems
- NCK Backstage, a 2020 French micro series about a teen band.
