= Le Port-Royal Apartments =

Le Port-Royal
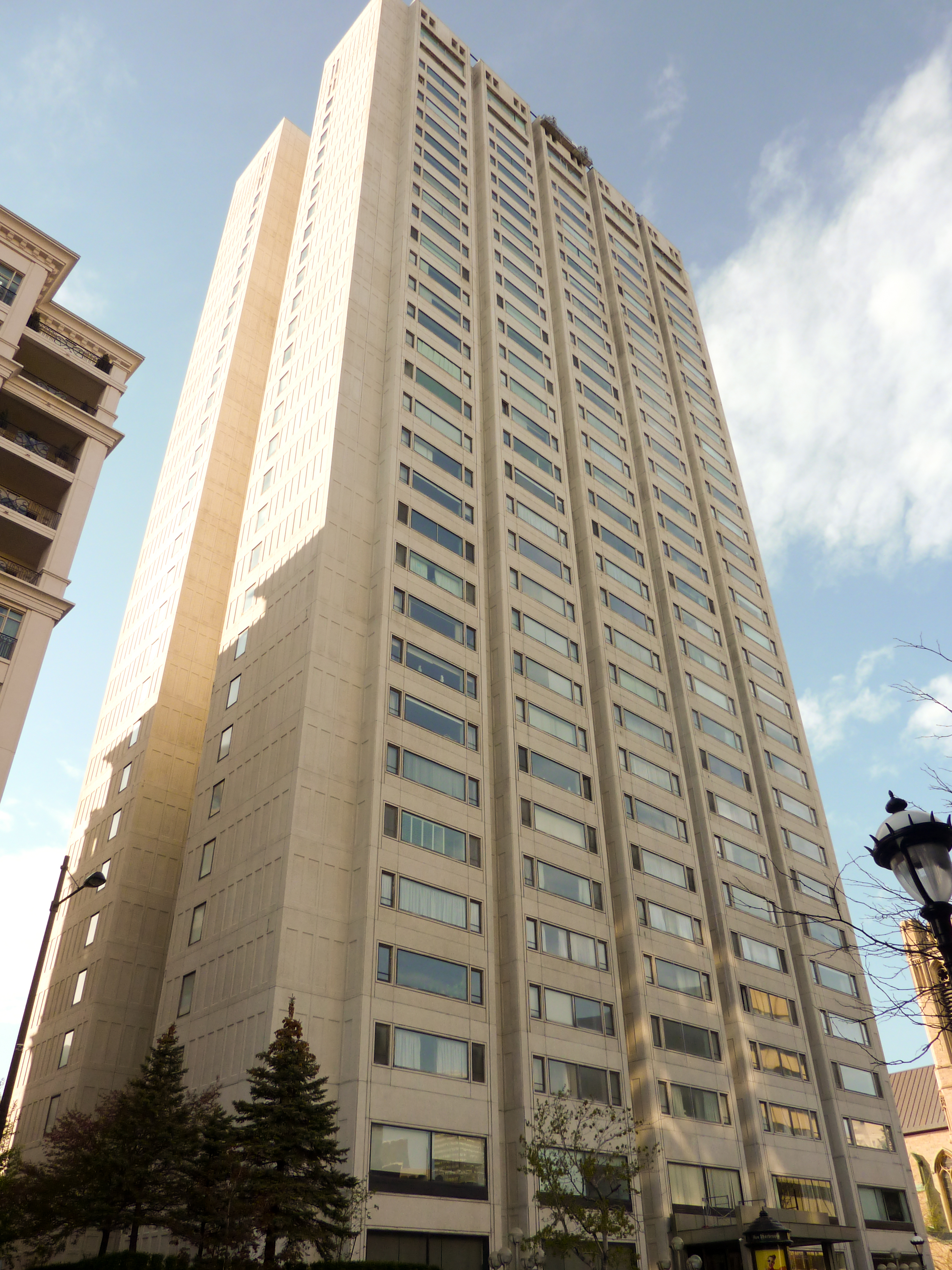

General information
- Type: Apartments
- Location: 1455, rue Sherbrooke Ouest; Montreal, Quebec; H3G 1L2
- Coordinates: 45.50123°N 73.56790°W
- Completed: 1964

Height
- Roof: 122 metres (400 ft)

Technical details
- Floor count: 33

Design and construction
- Architects: Gabor Acs; Ian Martin

Le Port-Royal (also known as Port-Royal Apartments) is an apartment building on Sherbrooke Street in the Golden Square Mile district of Montreal, Quebec, Canada. It is 33 stories, and 122 metres (400 ft) tall. Completed in 1964, it used to be the highest residential building in Canada east of Toronto until the completion of Altitude Montreal in 2013. It was built in the modernist style, with a concrete and glass facade. Le Port-Royal is located at 1455 Sherbrooke Street West opposite Mackay Street, and next to the Church of St. Andrew and St. Paul. The building consists of luxury apartments.

== See also ==
- List of tallest buildings in Montreal
