= Quad Windsor =

Neighborhood in Montreal, Quebec, Canada

Coordinates: 45.4969°N 73.5684°W

Quad Windsor is a new downtown neighborhood in Montreal, Quebec, Canada, to be constructed in stages and planned to be finished by 2025 and 2030. Cadillac Fairview will build a total of nine new buildings in the area, five being residential towers and two office towers all located south of Saint-Antoine Street, with construction stretching over 15 years. The project involves investments totaling more than $ 2 billion.

Salvatore Iacono, Cadillac Fairview senior vice-president of development and portfolio management for Eastern Canada, said the project will "completely transform the [Montreal] downtown core, creating a new district that offers a modern, state-of-the-art place to work and live."

The name Quad Windsor was chosen to emphasize the importance of the "quadrangle" (shortened to Quad) around the prestigious Windsor Station in the Montreal downtown area.

== Buildings ==
The 50 floors Tour des Canadiens condominium complex and the 26-storey Deloitte Tower office complex are the first to be constructed and are located close to the Bell Centre, home of the NHL's Montreal Canadiens.

Two of the additional residential towers during future phase 1 will be located on 1150 and 1250 Saint Antoine Street, south of the Bell Centre and will each be 53 stories high (170M). The two buildings will be connected across Saint Antoine Street by an aerial walkway that will extend the existing public pedestrian network, allowing pedestrians to cross Saint Antoine Street without having to walk outdoors. Each tower will be 53 stories and follow the natural gradient of the skyscrapers in the area.

In future phase 2, two office towers are to go up on nearby 750 Peel Street for a total leasable area of 1.1 million square feet. The two office towers will have a sculptural, tapering form, allowing for wider sidewalks at the base of the buildings and a more slender appearance in the skyline. The north side of the site, along with Peel and Saint-Antoine, will have a plaza and vibrant new retail offerings. The south side of the site along Saint Jacques Street will feature terraced gardens along the sidewalk, skylights below, and public access to the underground network. The buildings are designed by Adrian Smith + Gordon Gill Architecture, a Chicago firm responsible for large-scale international projects.

After completion of phases 1 and 2, phase 3 plans to construct three residential towers at 600 Peel and on Saint Jacques Street. Townhouses will sit at the base of the towers, along with more retail and services for residents, with a potential of up to 1.5 million square feet. The towers will be slightly curved to maximize their southern exposure and views, and will be built around a pedestrian thoroughfare that will cross the site. A large urban public park will be integrated into the project. The firm Adrian Smith + Gordon Gill Architecture has also planned these towers.

== Improvements on Windsor Station ==
In the final phase of the project, improvements are planned on the Windsor Station, a heritage treasure that inspired Cadillac Fairview's overall plans for Montreal. Cadillac Fairview will work to restore Windsor Station, paying special attention to preserving its essence, architecture and history.

== See also ==
- Downtown Montreal
