= Le V =

Coordinates: 45.5051°N 73.5637°W

Le V Courtyard Marriott Montreal Centre-ville
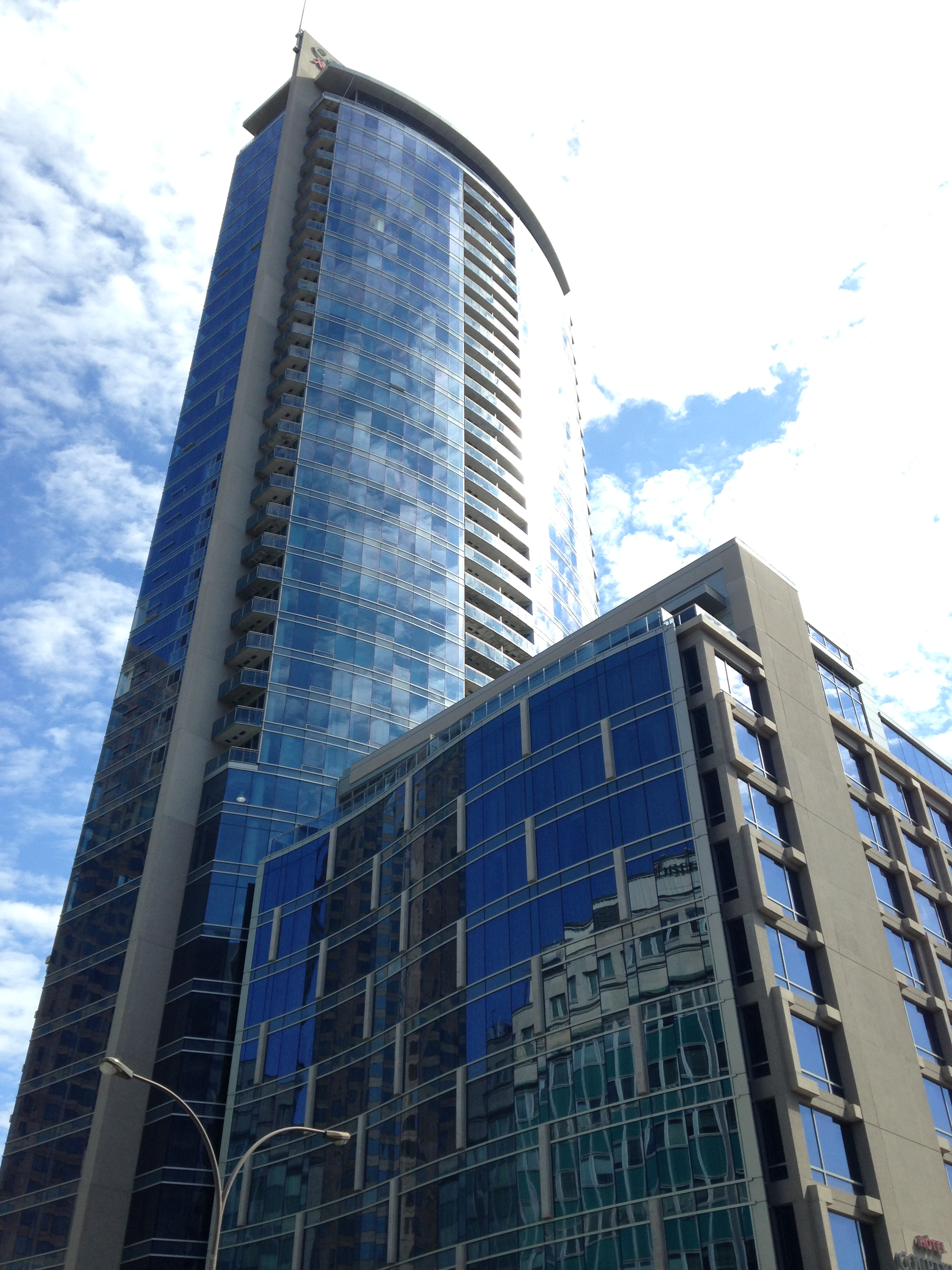
- The complex seen from René-Lévesque Boulevard
- Interactive map of the Le V Courtyard Marriott Montreal Centre-ville area

General information
- Status: Completed
- Type: Hotel, rental apartments
- Location: 360 René Lévesque Boulevard West, Ville-Marie, Montreal, Quebec, Canada
- Construction started: 2011
- Completed: 2014
- Cost: C$60 million
- Owner: Canvar Group

Height
- Height: 138 metres (453 ft)

Technical details
- Floor count: 40

Design and construction
- Architect: Brian Elsden Burrows
- Architecture firm: The Architex Group
- Structural engineer: Nicolet Chartrand Knoll
- Services engineer: Bouthillette Parizeau

Website
- www.le-v-montreal.com

Le V ('The V') is a hotel and apartment complex in Montreal, Quebec, Canada. It is located on René Lévesque Boulevard West between Bleury Street and Anderson Street in Downtown Montreal.

The hotel has 212 rooms and is located on the first twelve floors. It is branded as a Courtyard by Marriott hotel, known as the Courtyard Marriott Montreal Centre-ville.

The apartment section consists of 240 rental apartments and is located on the upper twenty-eight floors. It is branded as Le V.

Construction began in 2011. The Courtyard by Marriott hotel officially opened in September 2013, while the apartments section was completed in 2014. Having 40 floors and being 138 metres (453 ft) tall, it is the tenth-tallest building in Montreal.

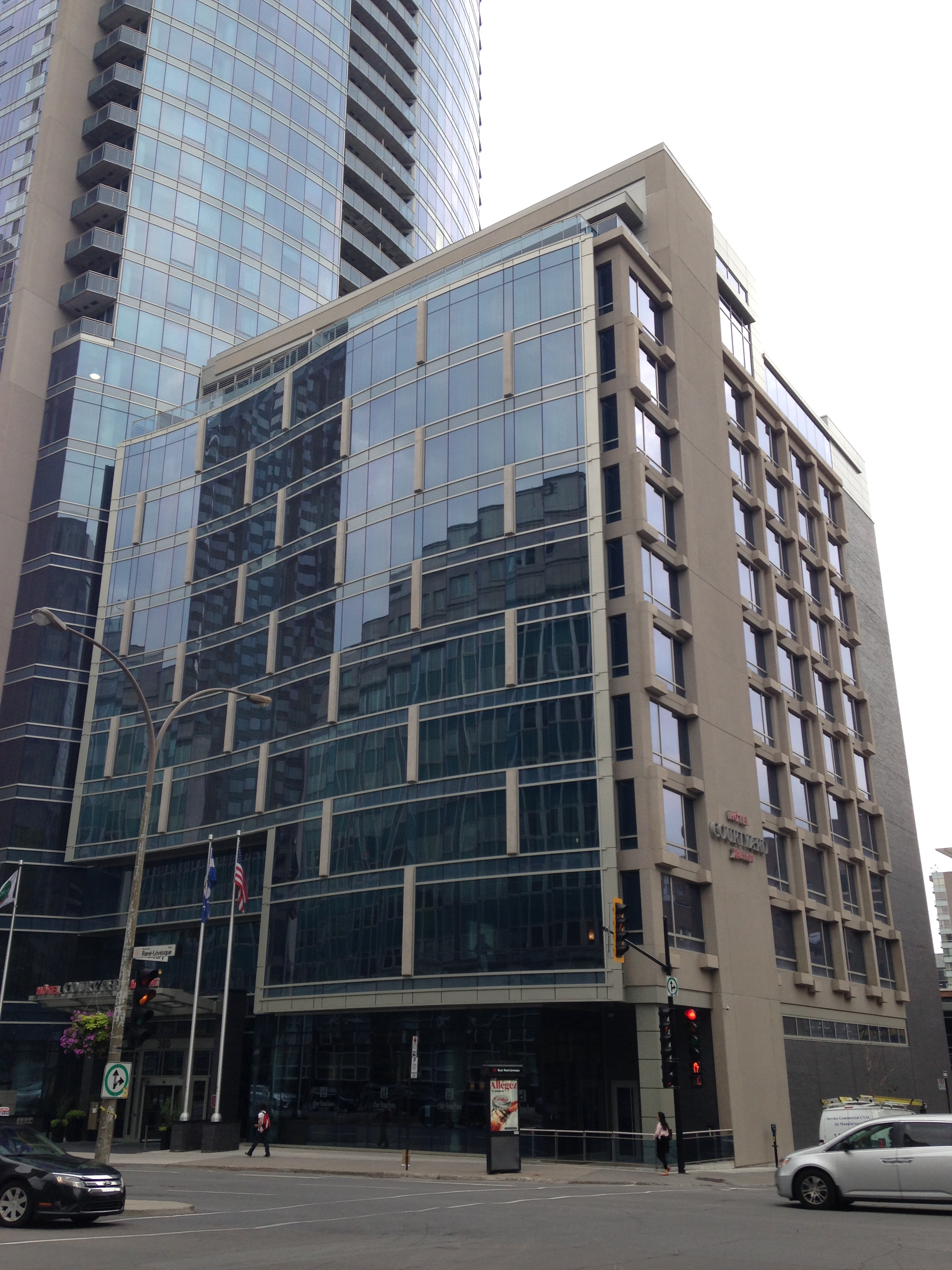
The hotel portion
