= Maestria Condominiums =

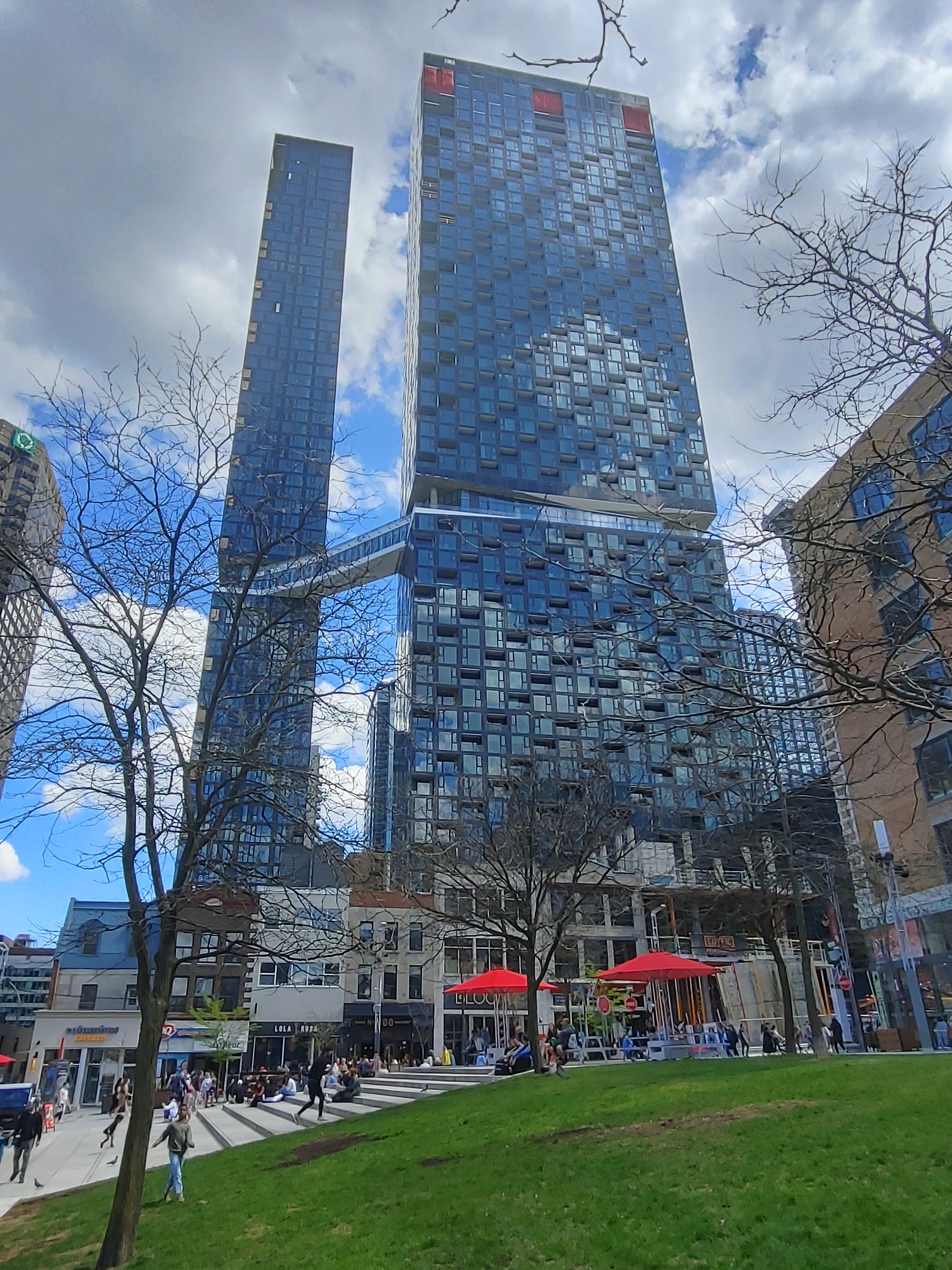
- The buildings under construction in May 2024.
- Interactive map of the Maestria Condominiums area

General information
- Status: Completed
- Type: Mixed-use
- Architectural style: Modern
- Location: 300 rue Sainte-Catherine Ouest; Montreal, Quebec
- Coordinates: 45°30′23.3″N 73°33′59.3″W
- Construction started: 26 September 2019
- Completed: 2024
- Cost: 900 million

Height
- Architectural: Tour B: 200 m (656 ft); Tour A: 184.7 m (606 ft)

Technical details
- Floor count: Tour B: 61; Tour A: 58

Design and construction
- Architect: Lemay
- Developer: Devimco Immobilier; Fiera Properties; Fonds de Solidarité Immobilier FTQ

Website
- www.maestriacondos.com

Maestria Condominiums is a mixed-use building complex topped-out in Montreal, Quebec, Canada. The buildings were completed in 2024.

== Design ==
Maestria Condominiums feature two nearly identical buildings connected by a skybridge at the 26th and 27th floors, respectively. The buildings overlook the Place des Festivals in Downtown Montreal. The buildings feature 1,750 residences, a small public plaza, and a variety of other amenities.

== See also ==
- List of tallest buildings in Montreal
- List of tallest buildings in Quebec
