= 1000 Sherbrooke West =

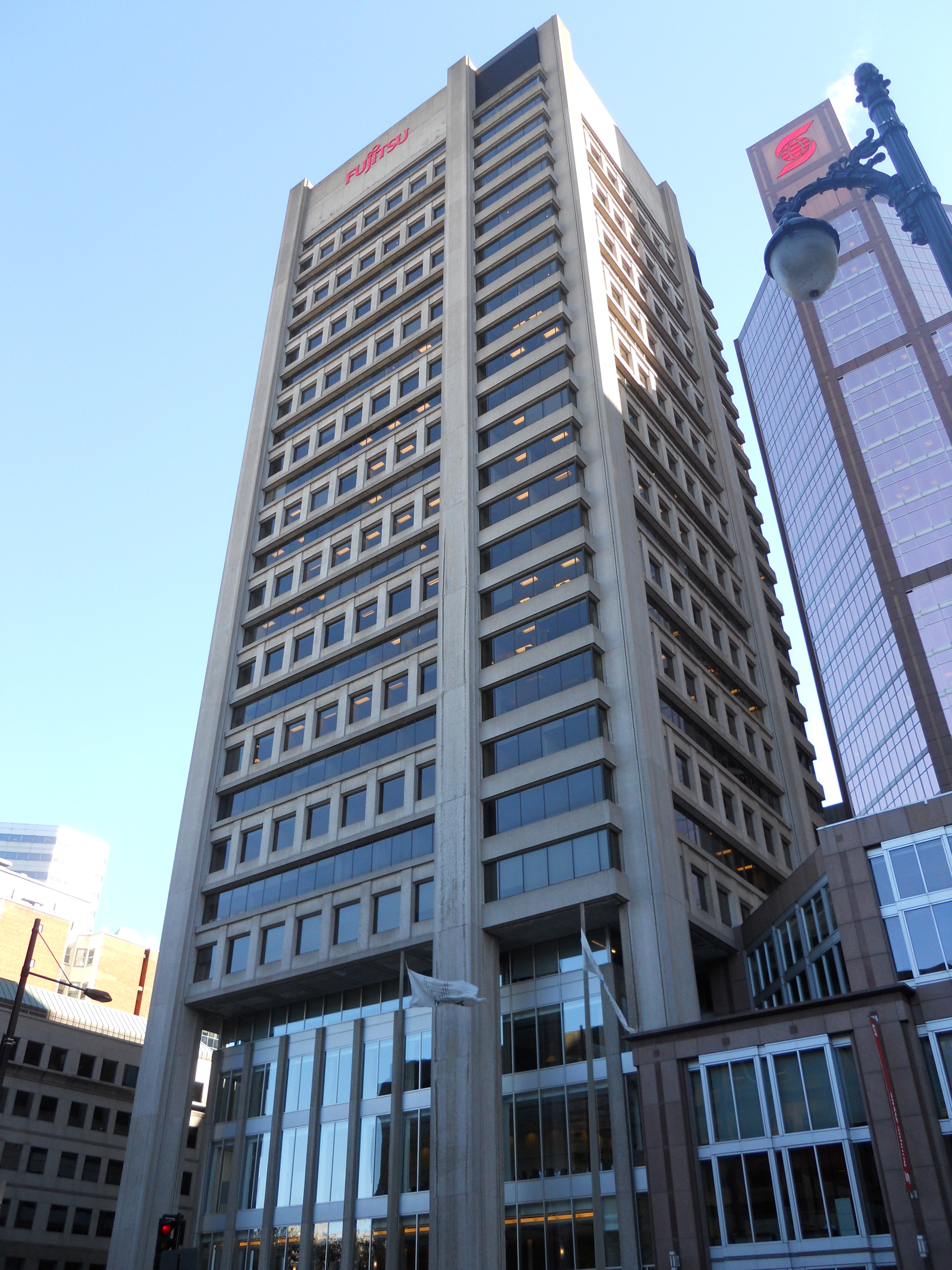
- Interactive map of the 1000 Sherbrooke West area
- Former names: Centre Mont-Royal; Place Internationale de l'Aviation

General information
- Status: Completed
- Type: Office
- Architectural style: Brutalism
- Location: 1000 rue Sherbrooke Ouest; Montreal, Quebec, Canada
- Coordinates: 45.5027°N 73.5751°W
- Completed: 1969 – 1974

Height
- Roof: 128 m (420 ft)

Technical details
- Floor count: 28; 4 below ground
- Floor area: 35,952 m^{2} (386,980 sq ft)
- Lifts/elevators: 11

Design and construction
- Architect: Rosen Caruso Vecsei Architects

Website
- www.monit.com/en/property/1000-sherbrooke-west/

1000 Sherbrooke West (formerly known as Centre Mont-Royal and Place Internationale de l'Aviation) is a 28-storey, 128 m (420 ft) skyscraper at 1000 rue Sherbrooke Ouest (Sherbrooke Street West) next to Tour Scotia and opposite McTavish Street in downtown Montreal, Quebec, Canada. The tower was designed by Rosen Caruso Vecsei Architects in the Brutalist architectural style, with a concrete and glass facade. Construction was completed in 1974 and once housed the headquarters of ICAO. In 1987, the ICAO offices were the site of the signing of the Montreal Protocol, an international treaty to protect the ozone layer - an agreement considered the most effective international agreement on the environment to date. The Centre Mont-Royal conference center is located on site.

== See also ==
- List of tallest buildings in Montreal
