= 400 Sherbrooke West =

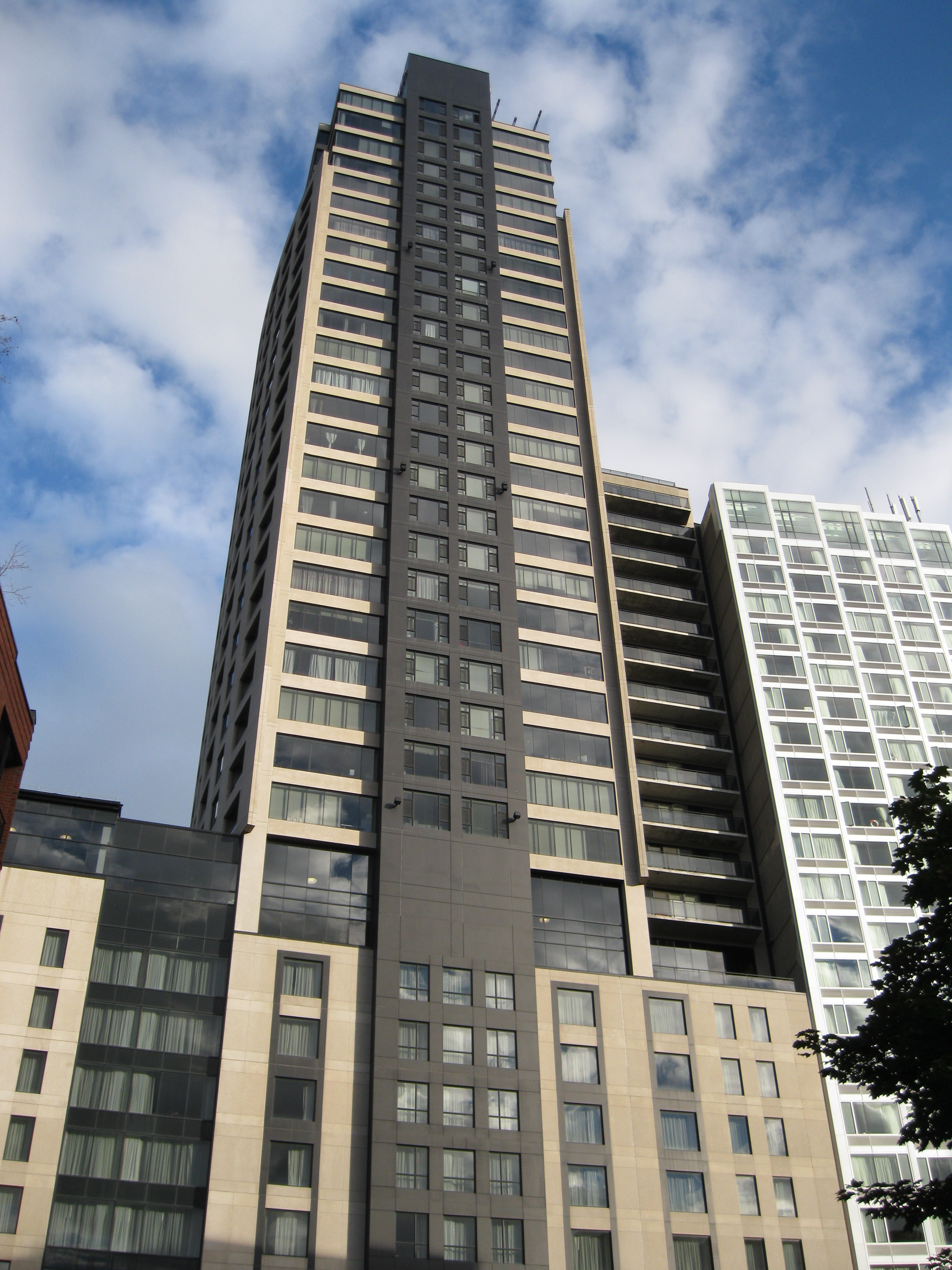

- Location within Montreal

General information
- Type: Rental apartments
- Location: 400 rue Sherbrooke Ouest; Montreal, Quebec, Canada
- Coordinates: 45.5077°N 73.5713°W
- Completed: 2009

Height
- Roof: 112.5 m (369 ft)

Technical details
- Floor count: 37

Design and construction
- Architect: Geiger Huot Architects

The 400 Sherbrooke West, is a 37-storey skyscraper in Montreal, Quebec, Canada.

It is an apartment complex and is located at the intersection of rue Sherbrooke Ouest (Sherbrooke Street) and Bleury Street, near the Place-des-Arts Metro station and McGill University in the Quartier des Spectacles.

Completed in 2009, it is currently the 29th tallest building in Montreal, standing at 112.5 m (369 ft).
