= Altoria =

Coordinates: 45.5022°N 73.5632°W

Air Canada Tower Altoria Condominiums
- French: Tour Air Canada; Tour Altoria
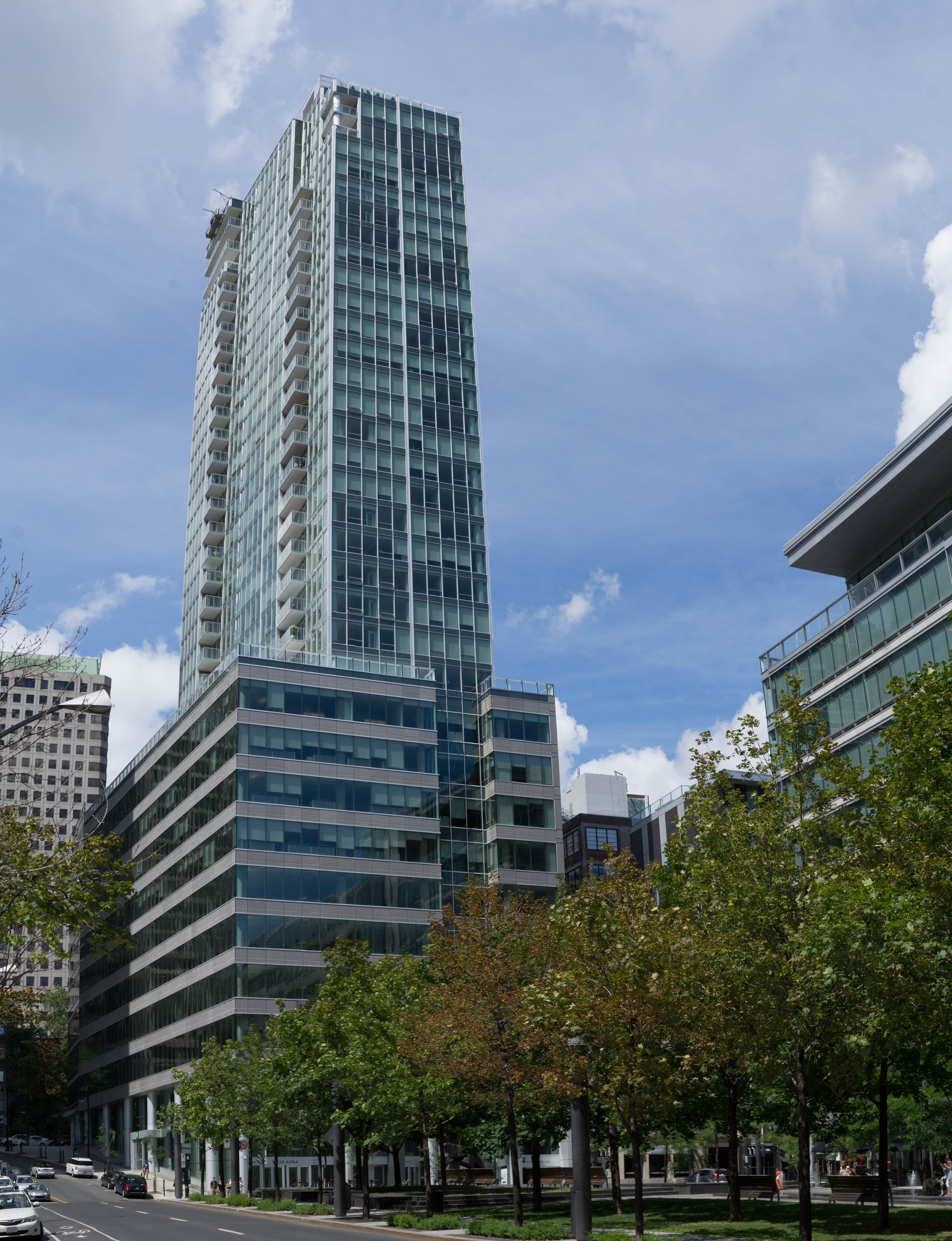
- Interactive map of the Air Canada Tower; Altoria Condominiums area

General information
- Status: Completed
- Type: Condominiums, office
- Location: Canada
- Construction started: 2011
- Completed: 2014
- Cost: C$100 million

Height
- Height: 120 metres (390 ft)

Technical details
- Floor count: 35

Design and construction
- Architecture firm: NEUF Architect(e)s

Website
- altoria.ca

Air Canada Tower (French: Tour Air Canada, also known as Altoria, and previously known until Winter 2020 as Aimia Tower), is a 35-storey mixed-use skyscraper in Montreal, Quebec, Canada. The first ten floors are home to office spaces, while the remaining 25 floors consist of 152 condos. The office component is anchored by Aimia and is known as the Aimia Tower.

The tower is located right next to Complexe Maisonneuve, the Tour de la Bourse and Square-Victoria-OACI Metro Station.

The project's promoter is Kevric Corporation. Construction work started in 2011 and was completed in 2014.

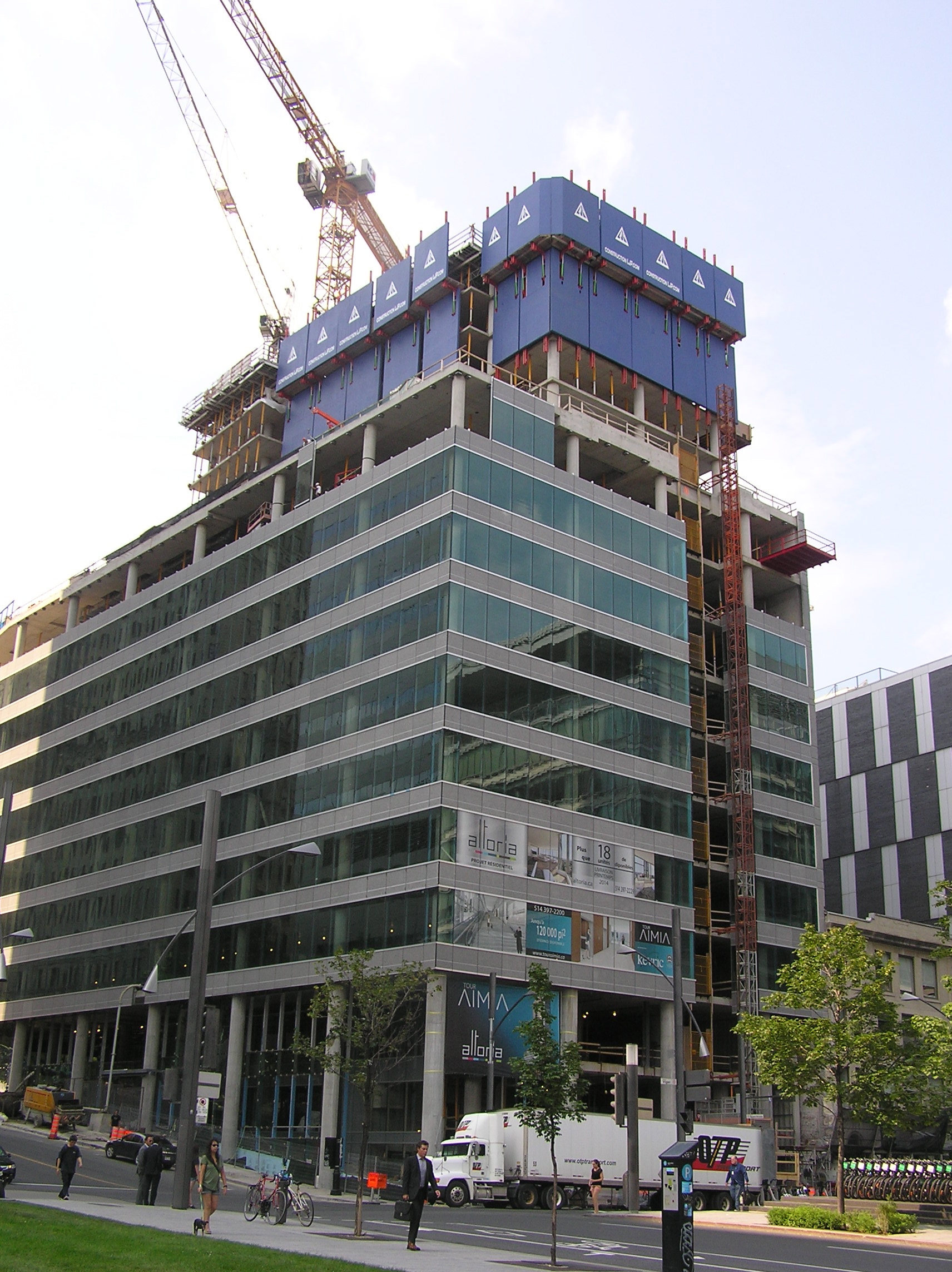
Construction site in August 2013

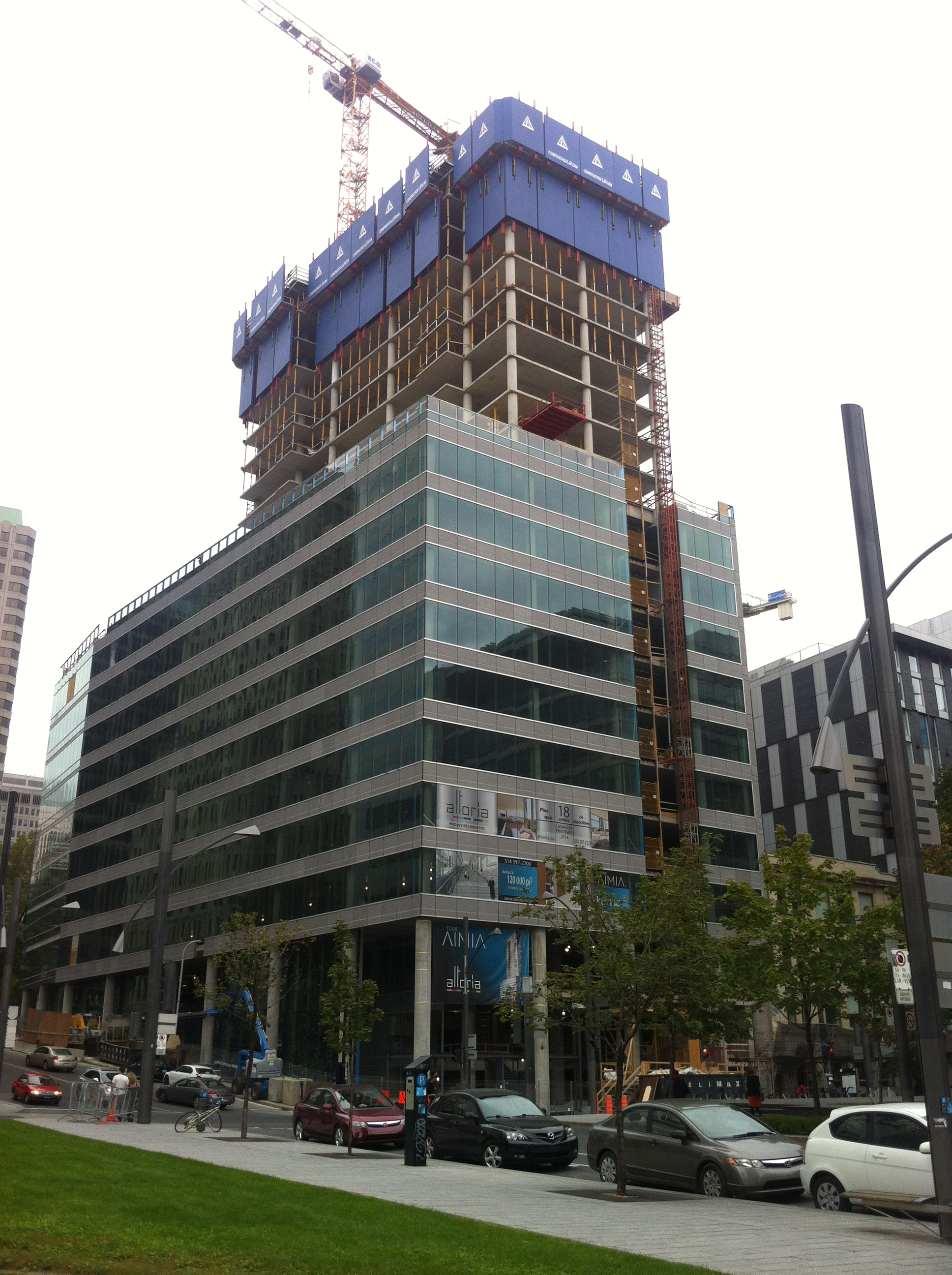
Construction site in September 2013

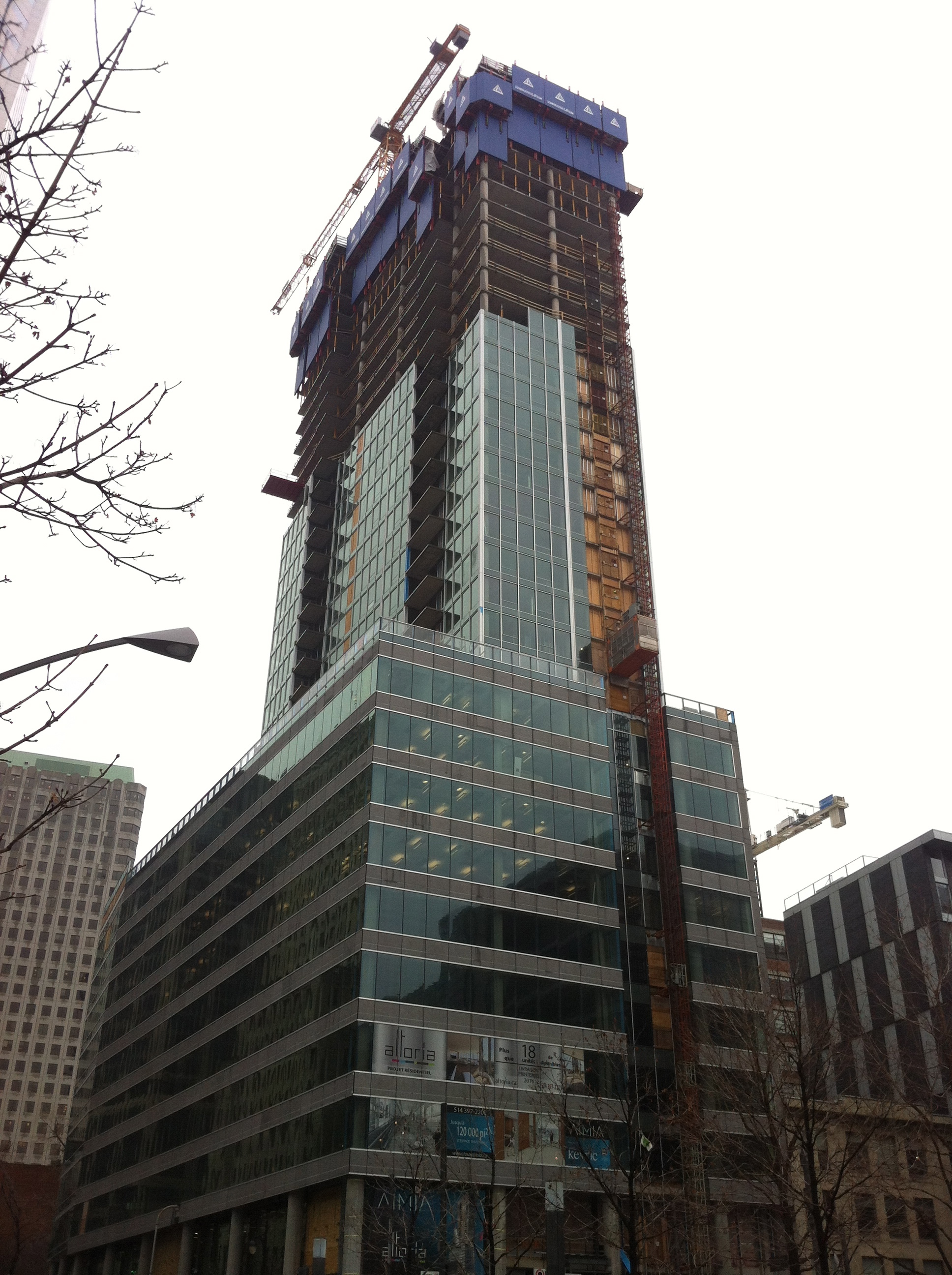
Construction site in January 2014

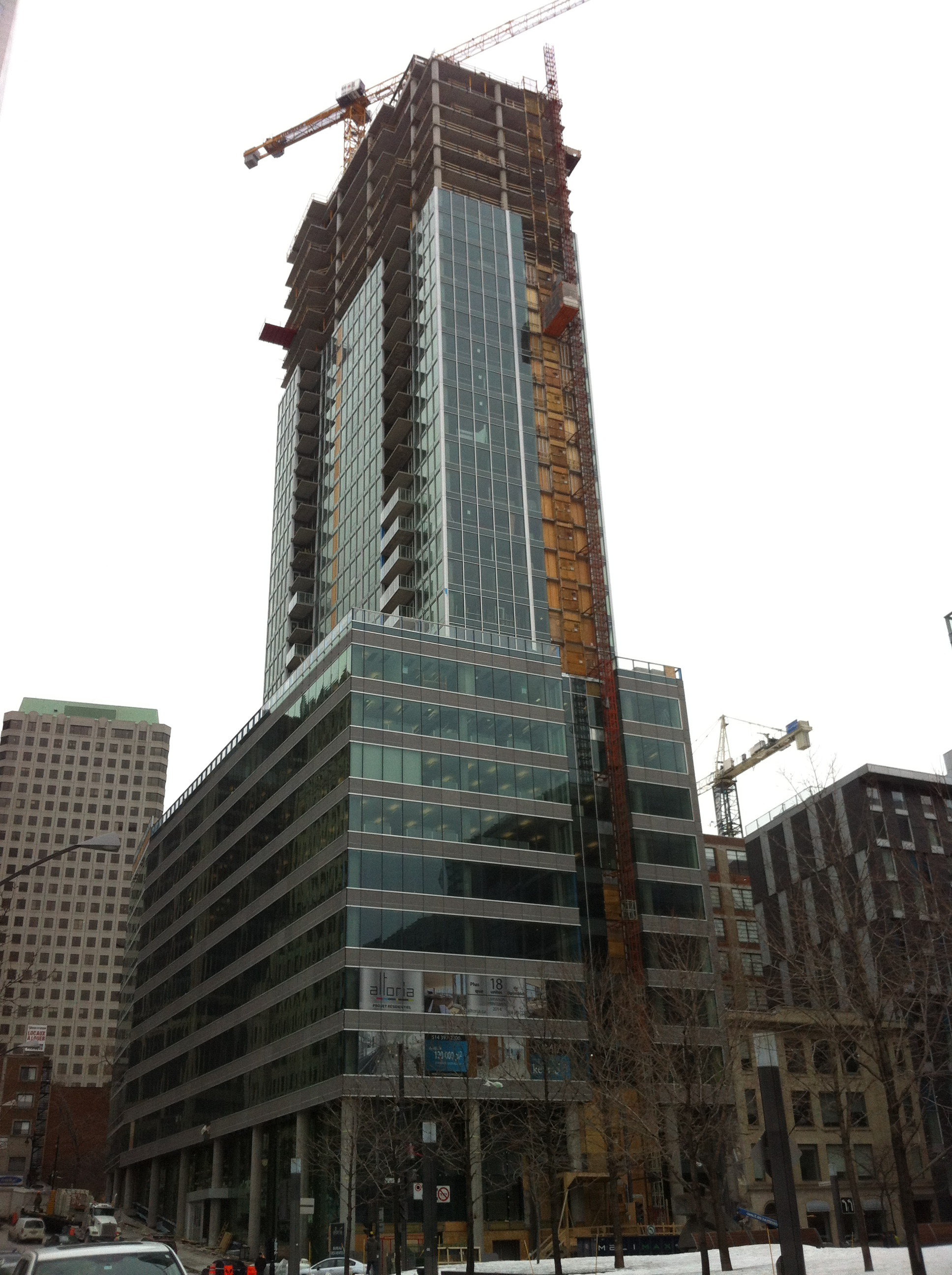
Construction site in February 2014

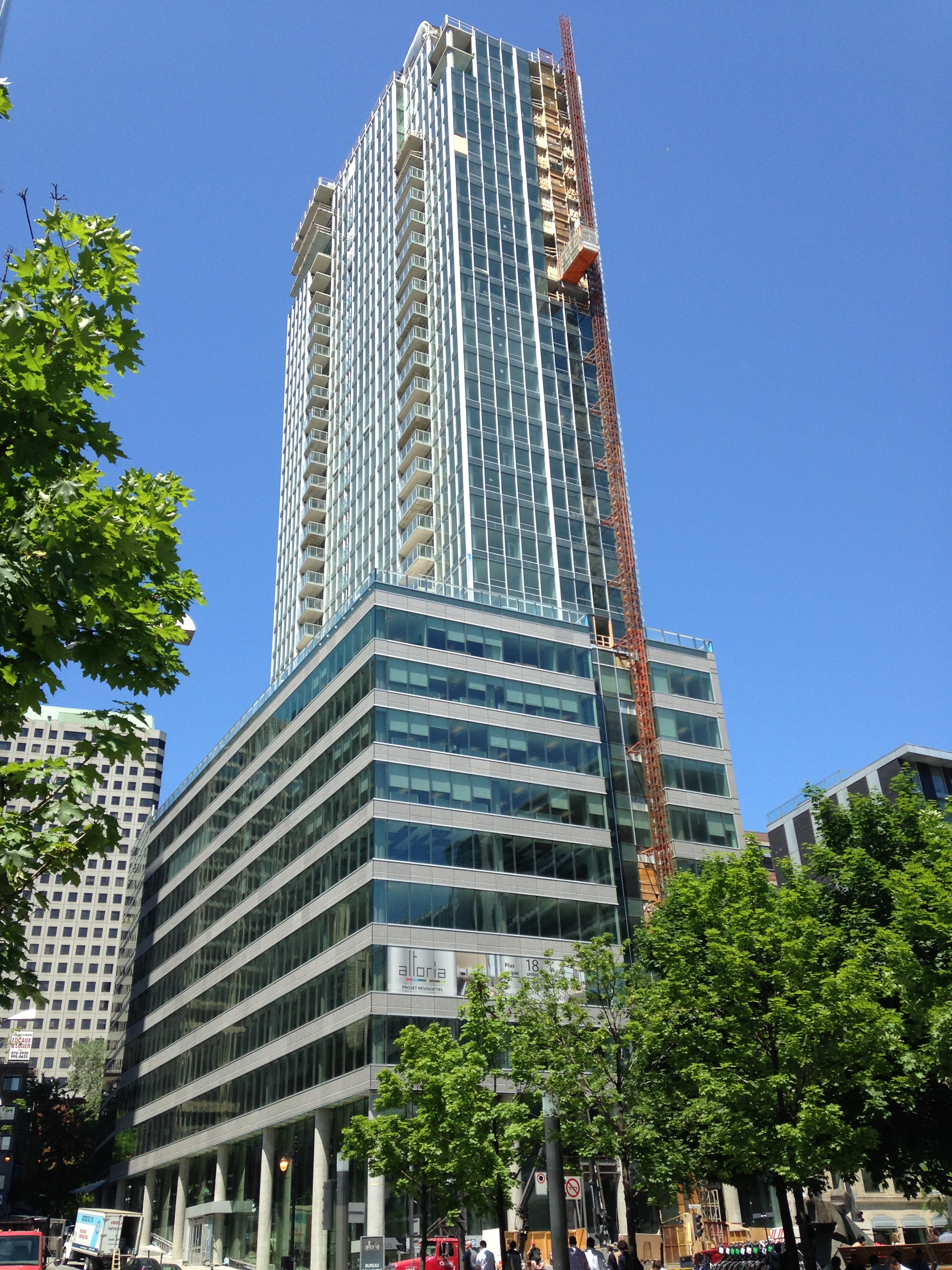
Construction site in June 2014

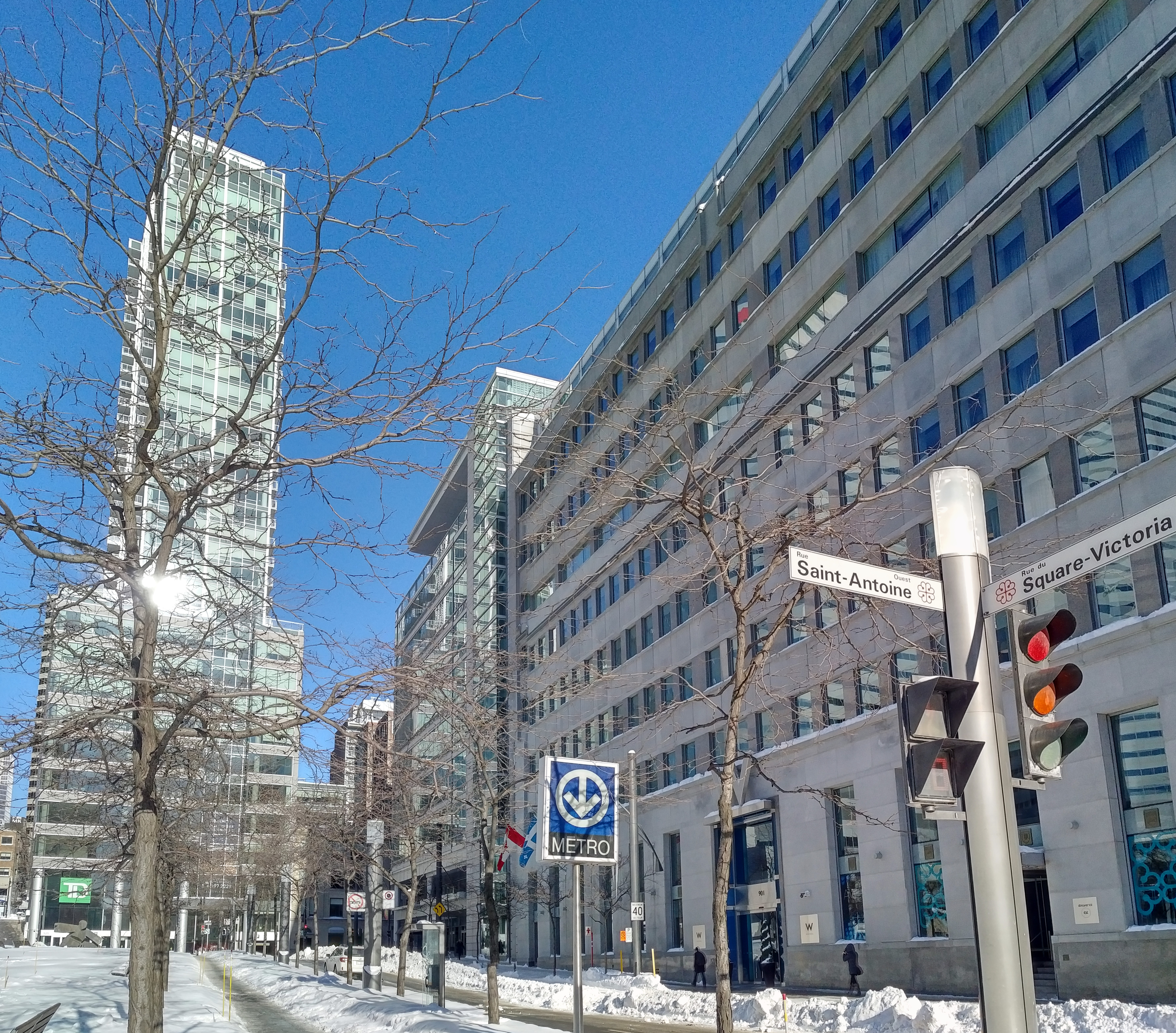
View from Square Victoria corner of Saint-Antoine
