= YUL Condos =

YUL Condominiums
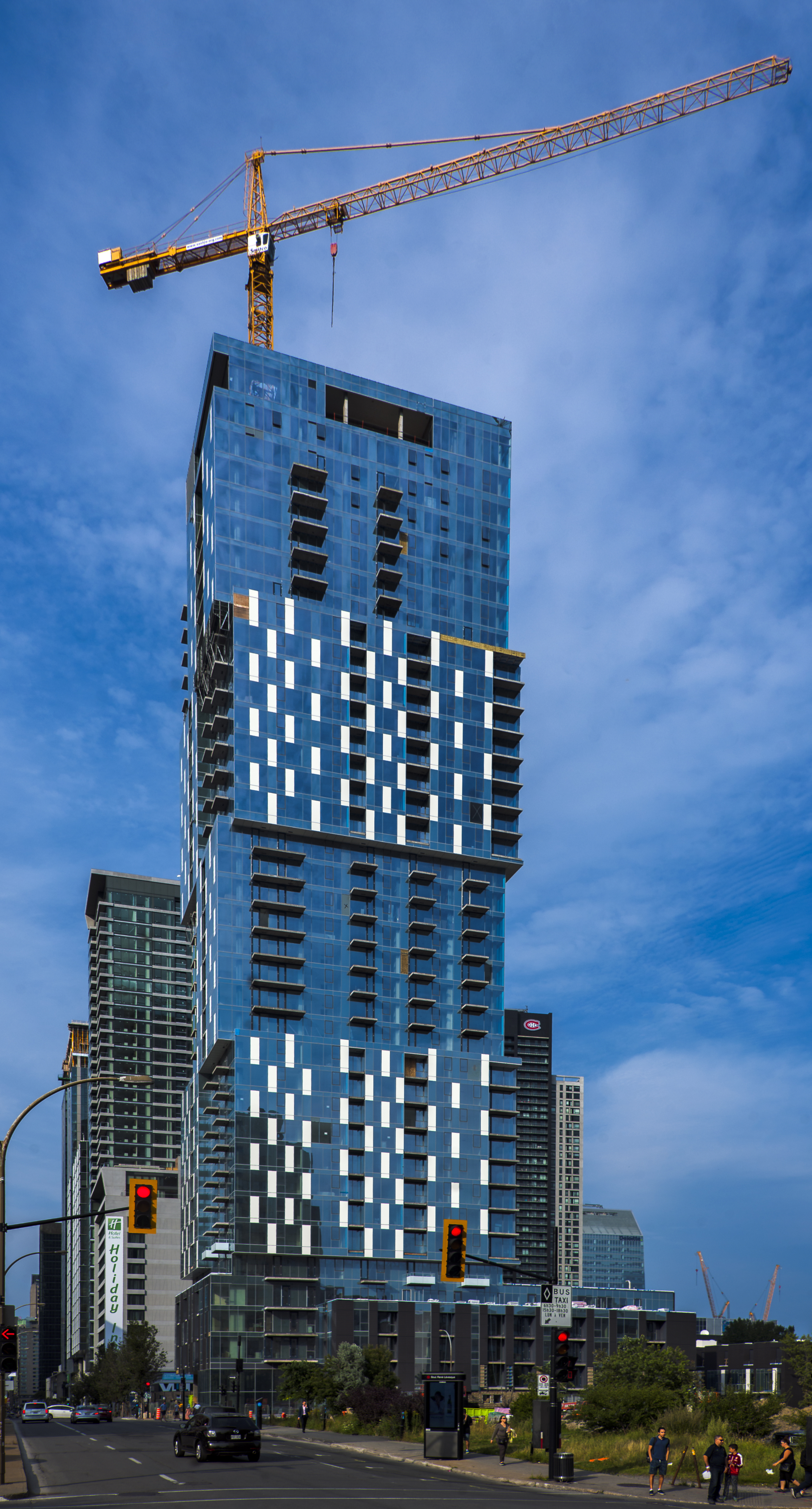
- First tower near completion in 2017
- Interactive map of the YUL Condominiums area

General information
- Status: Completed
- Type: Condominiums
- Location: 108-1450 Boulevard René-Lévesque Ouest, Montreal, Quebec, Canada
- Coordinates: 45.4950°N 73.5732°W
- Construction started: September 2014
- Completed: 2017 (first tower)
- Cost: CAN$300 million

Height
- Height: 120 metres (390 ft)

Technical details
- Floor count: 38

Design and construction
- Architecture firm: Menkès Shooner Dagenais LeTourneux/Stefano Domenici

Website
- destinationyul.com

YUL Condominiums is a large residential skyscraper complex in Montreal, Quebec, Canada. The towers are located on René-Lévesque Boulevard at the corner of Bishop and Mackay, near E-Commerce Place and the Bell Centre.

The towers have 38 floors and 120 metres (390 ft) tall, and consist of 873 condos. YUL Condominiums also included the construction of 17 townhouses on Overdale Avenue. The promoter of the project is Kheng Ly of Brivia Group.

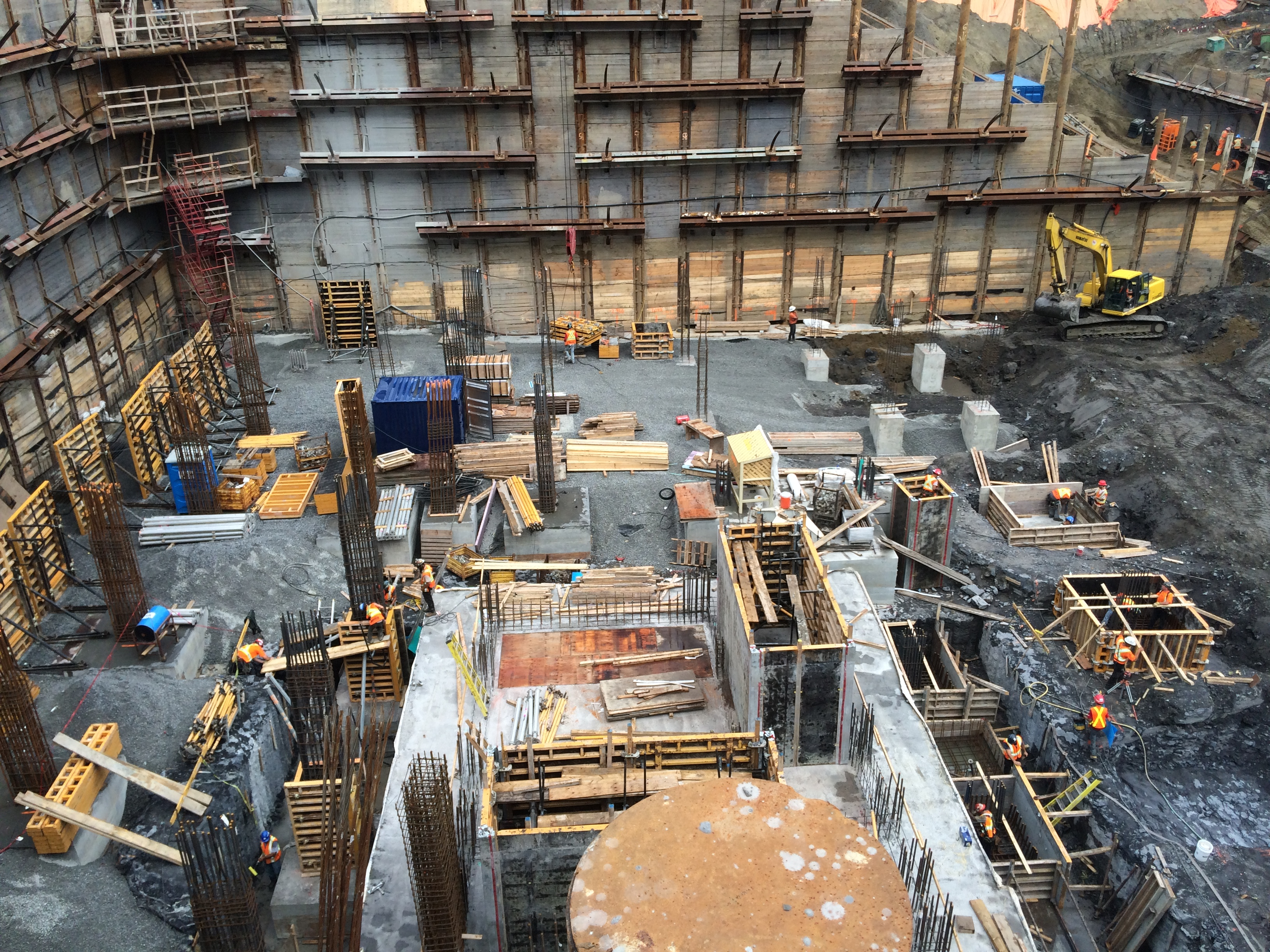
Construction site in September 2015
