= Altitude Montreal =

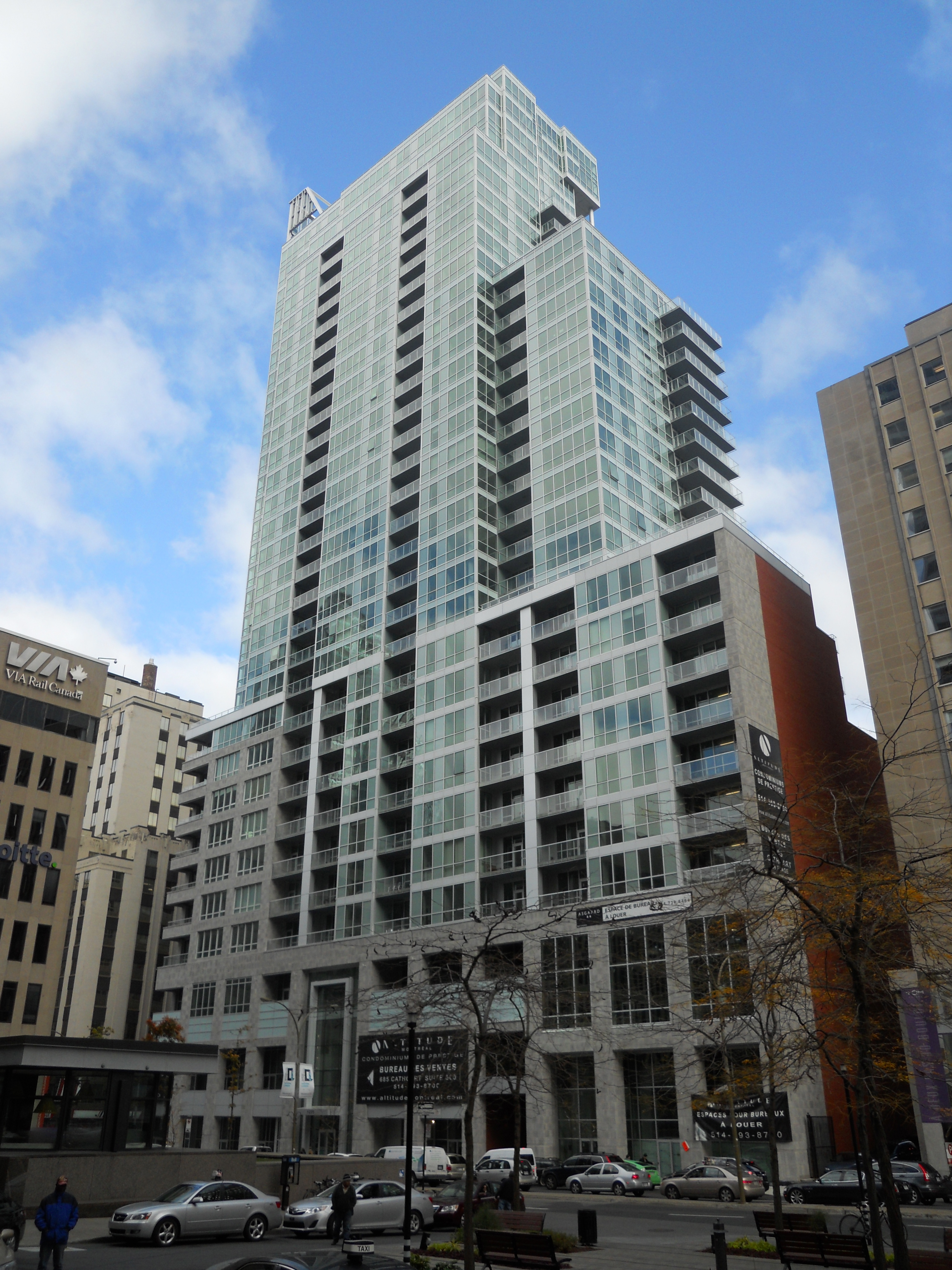
- Interactive map of the Altitude Montreal area

General information
- Status: Completed
- Type: Condominiums
- Location: 1225 Robert-Bourassa Boulevard; Montreal, Quebec, Canada
- Coordinates: 45°30′09″N 73°34′05″W
- Construction started: 2016
- Completed: 2019

Height
- Architectural: 124 m (407 ft)

Technical details
- Floor count: 33
- Lifts/elevators: 5

Design and construction
- Architecture firm: Jean-Pierre Lagacé Architects
- Developer: Daca Group
- Structural engineer: Nicolet Chartrand Knoll
- Services engineer: Bouthillette Parizeau
- Other designers: Nicole Vekemans

Altitude Montreal is a 33-storey, 124 m (407 ft) skyscraper in Montreal, Quebec, Canada. It is located at 1225 Robert-Bourassa Boulevard at the corner of Cathcart Street in Downtown Montreal, opposite Place Ville-Marie. This modern skyscraper was designed by some of the same architects who were behind the Louvre Pyramid.

Altitude Montreal consists of luxury condominiums and offers hotel-style services to residents such as a pool, spa, fitness centre, lounge, restaurant, business centre, conference room, security, concierge service and a valet. This location also offers famed restaurants like Zibo and Moretti at its street level.

As of 2021, it is the city's second tallest residential tower, as it was surpassed by L'Avenue upon its completion. Construction on the tower began on May 3, 2016, on what was previously a parking lot, and was topped out with the addition of the architectural tip in November.

Altitude Montreal was designed by architecture firm Jean-Pierre Lagacé Architects, Nicolet Chartrand Knoll are the structural engineers, Bouthillette Parizeau are the mechanical engineers, and interior design by Nicole Vekemans. The developer is Daca Group.

== See also ==
- List of tallest buildings in Montreal
