= Deloitte Tower =

Building located in Montréal, Québec, Canada

- 1115 Saint-Antoine Street West
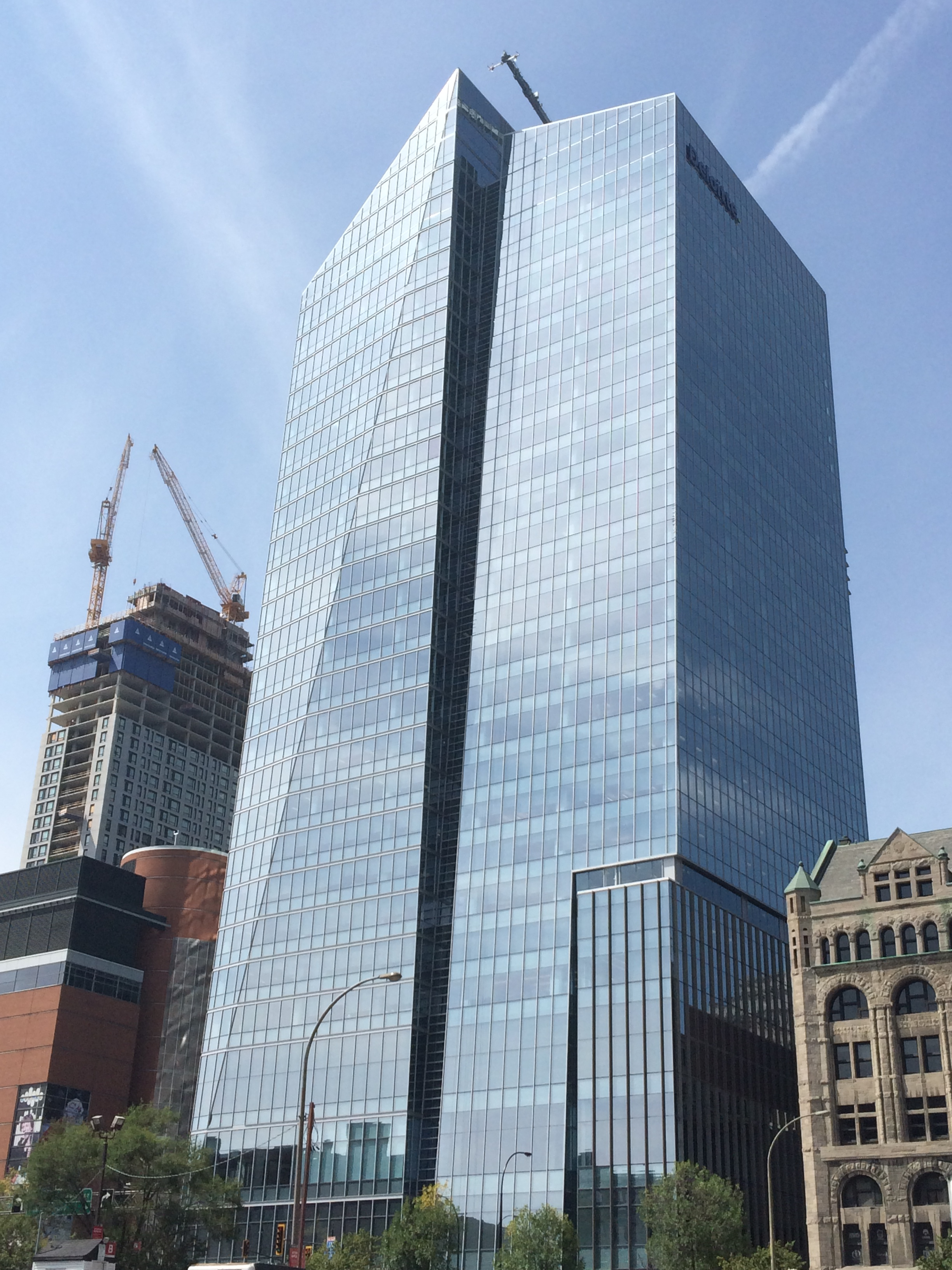
- Interactive map of the Deloitte Tower area

General information
- Status: Completed
- Type: Office
- Location: Canada
- Coordinates: 45.496729°N 73.568192°W
- Current tenants: Deloitte
- Construction started: 2012
- Completed: 2015
- Cost: C$200 million
- Landlord: Cadillac Fairview

Height
- Height: 135 metres (443 ft)

Technical details
- Floor count: 26
- Floor area: 500,000 sq. foot

Design and construction
- Architecture firm: Kohn Pedersen Fox

Website
- www.latourdeloitte.ca

The Deloitte Tower (French: Tour Deloitte) is a 26-storey office building in Montreal, Quebec, Canada, located between Windsor Station and the Bell Centre. It is the city's first privately owned and financed commercial office tower to be built in more than 20 years. Completed in May 2015, the building features 495,000 square feet (46,000 m^{2}) of office space, and 20,000 square feet (1,900 m^{2}) of retail space. It is named for professional services firm Deloitte, which occupies 160,000 square feet (15,000 m^{2}) of office space in the building. It also houses the headquarters of Rio Tinto, which relocated from the Maison Alcan. The company occupies approximately 190,000 square feet (18,000 m^{2}) on the top eight floors of the building. The Deloitte Tower is planned as part of a larger, multiphase, mixed use project that will include retail and residential spaces. The building is owned by Cadillac Fairview.

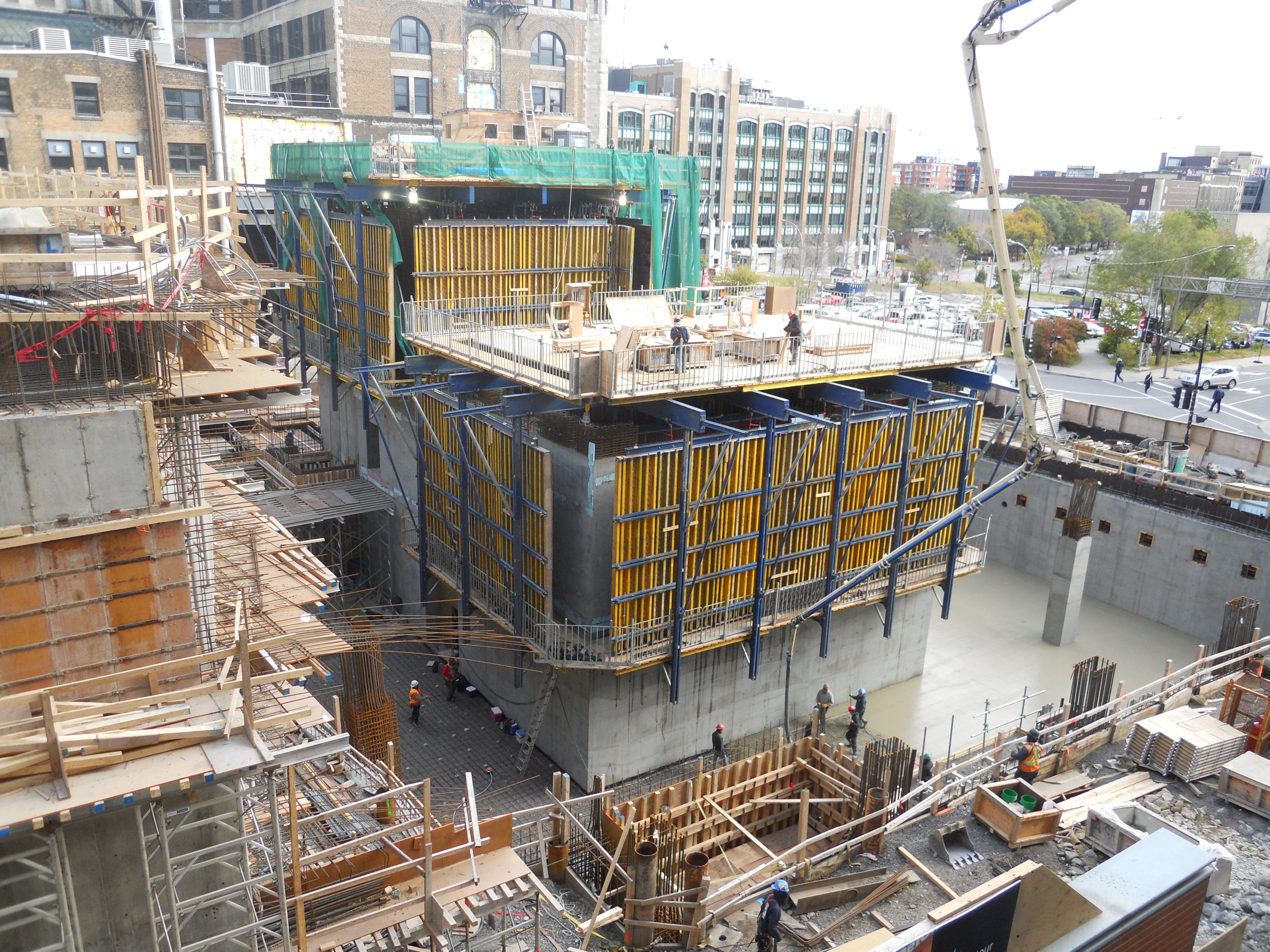
Construction site in October 2013

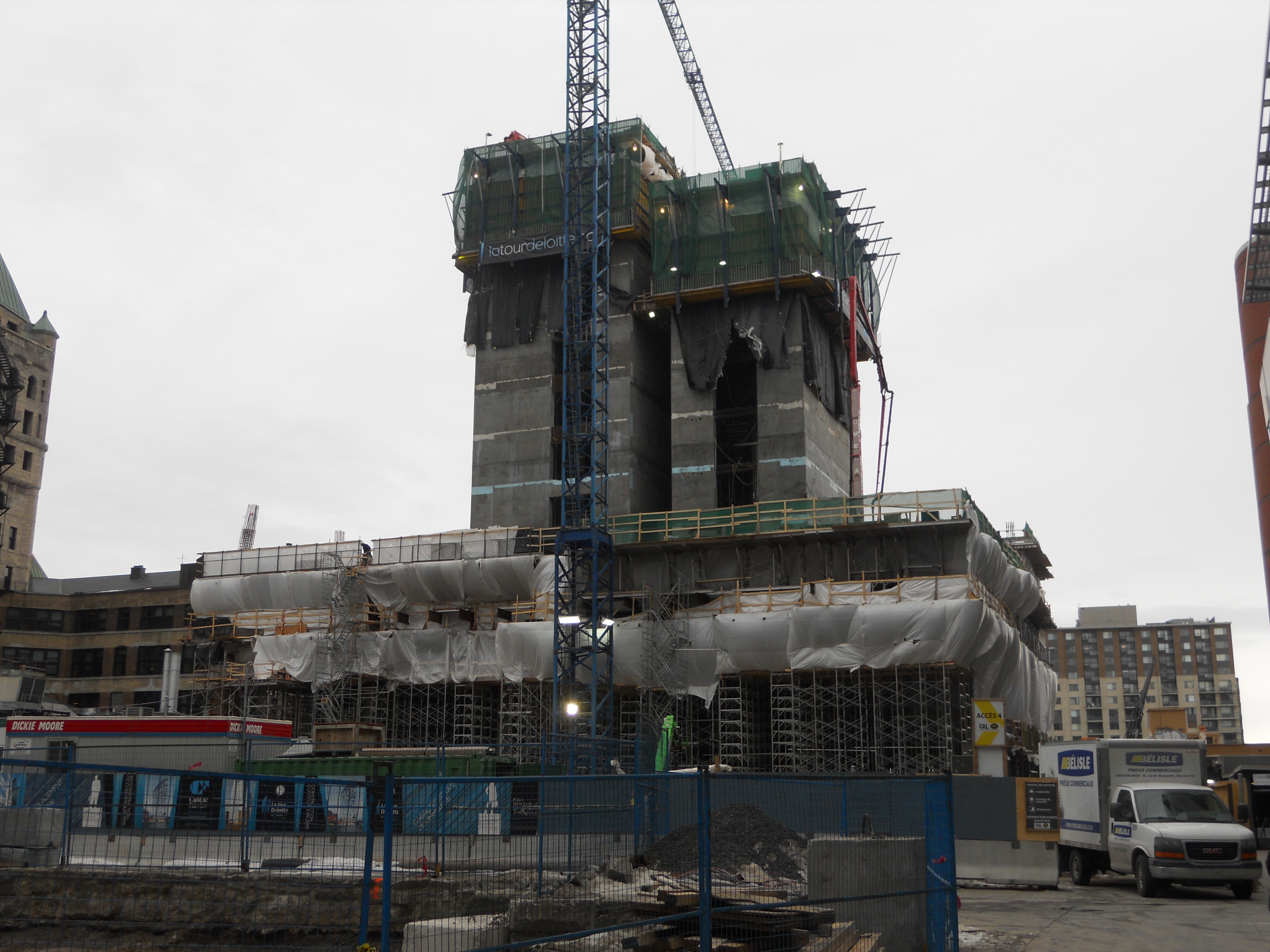
Construction site in March 2014

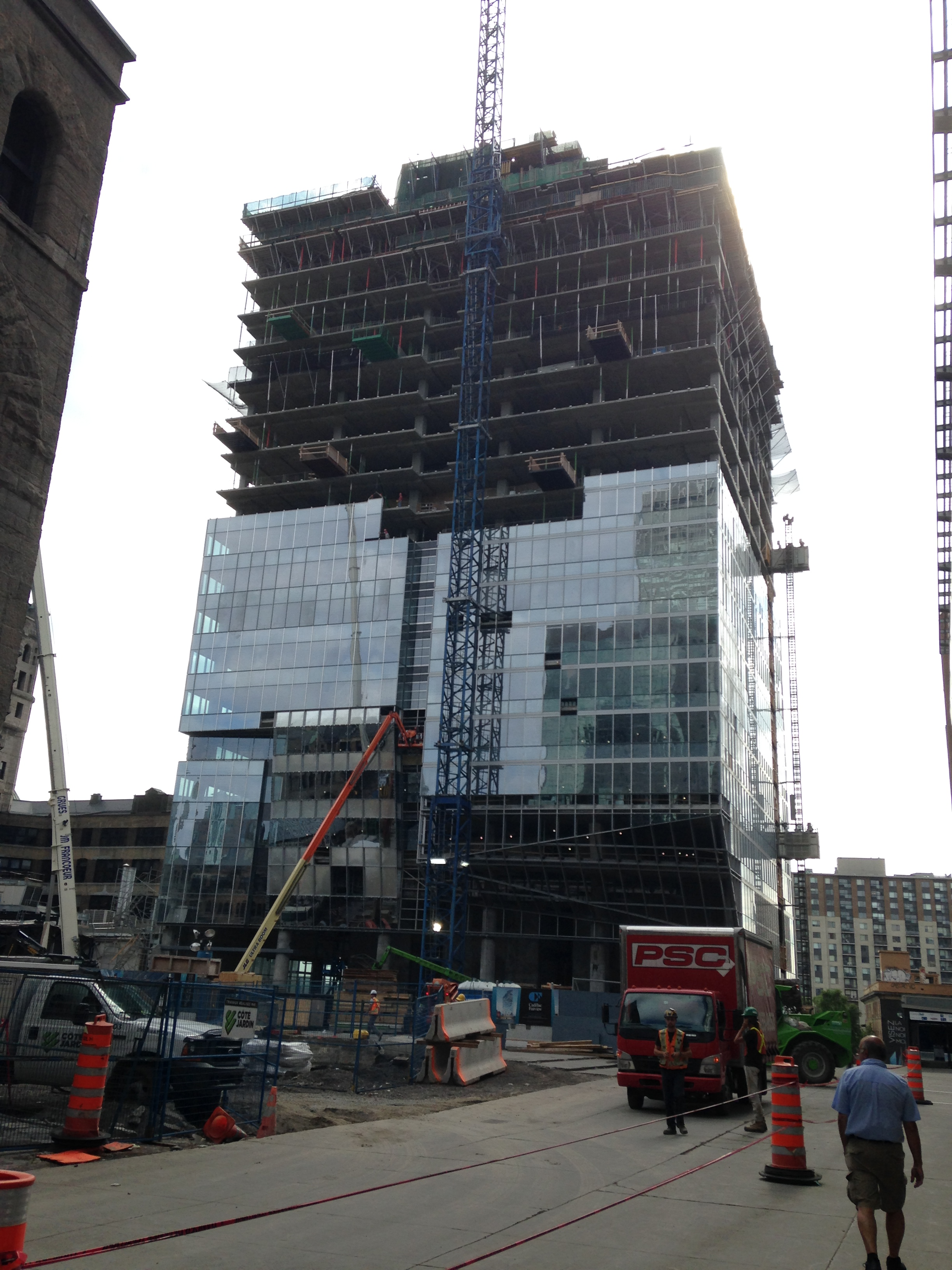
Construction site in August 2014

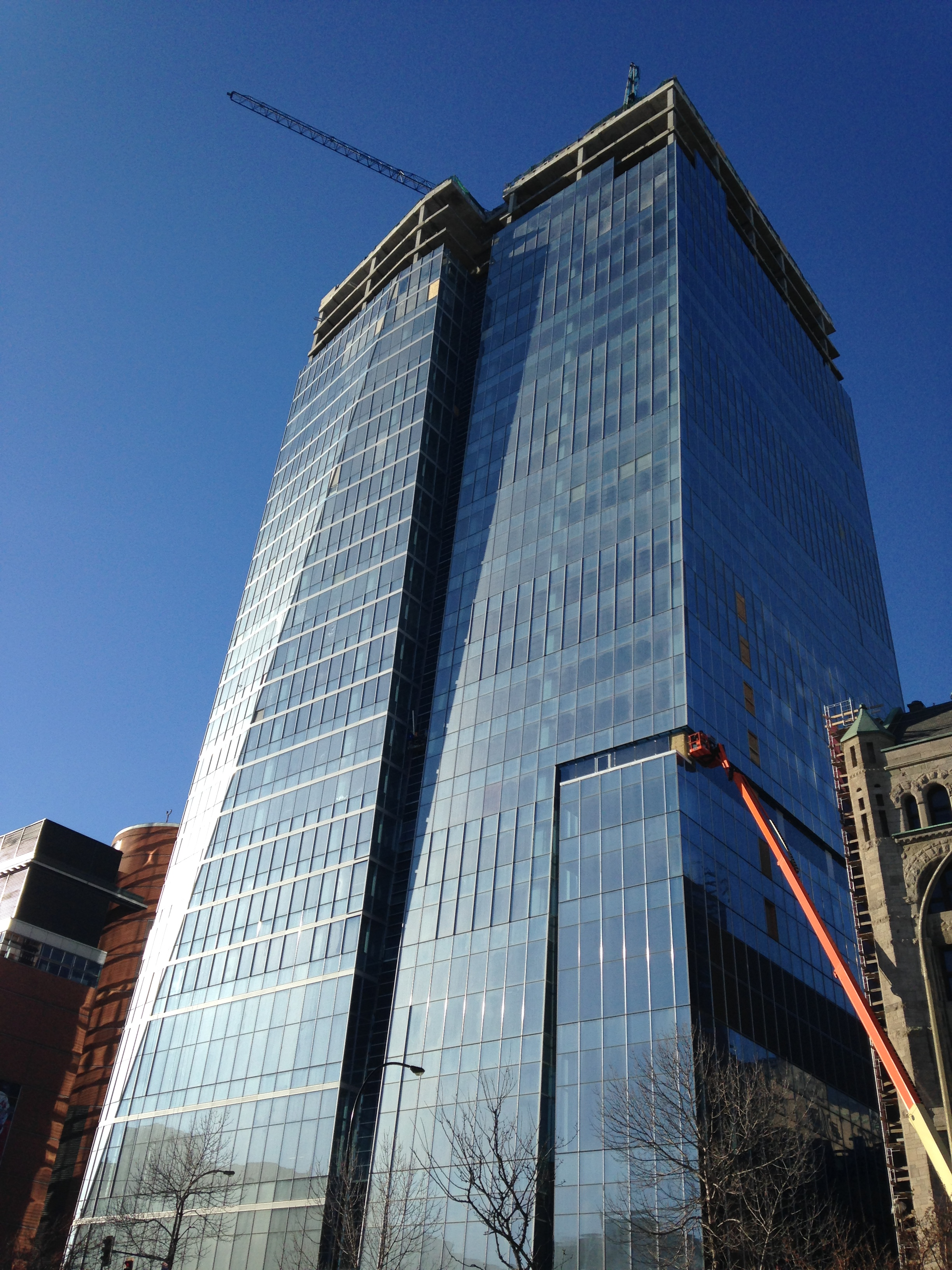
Construction site in December 2014

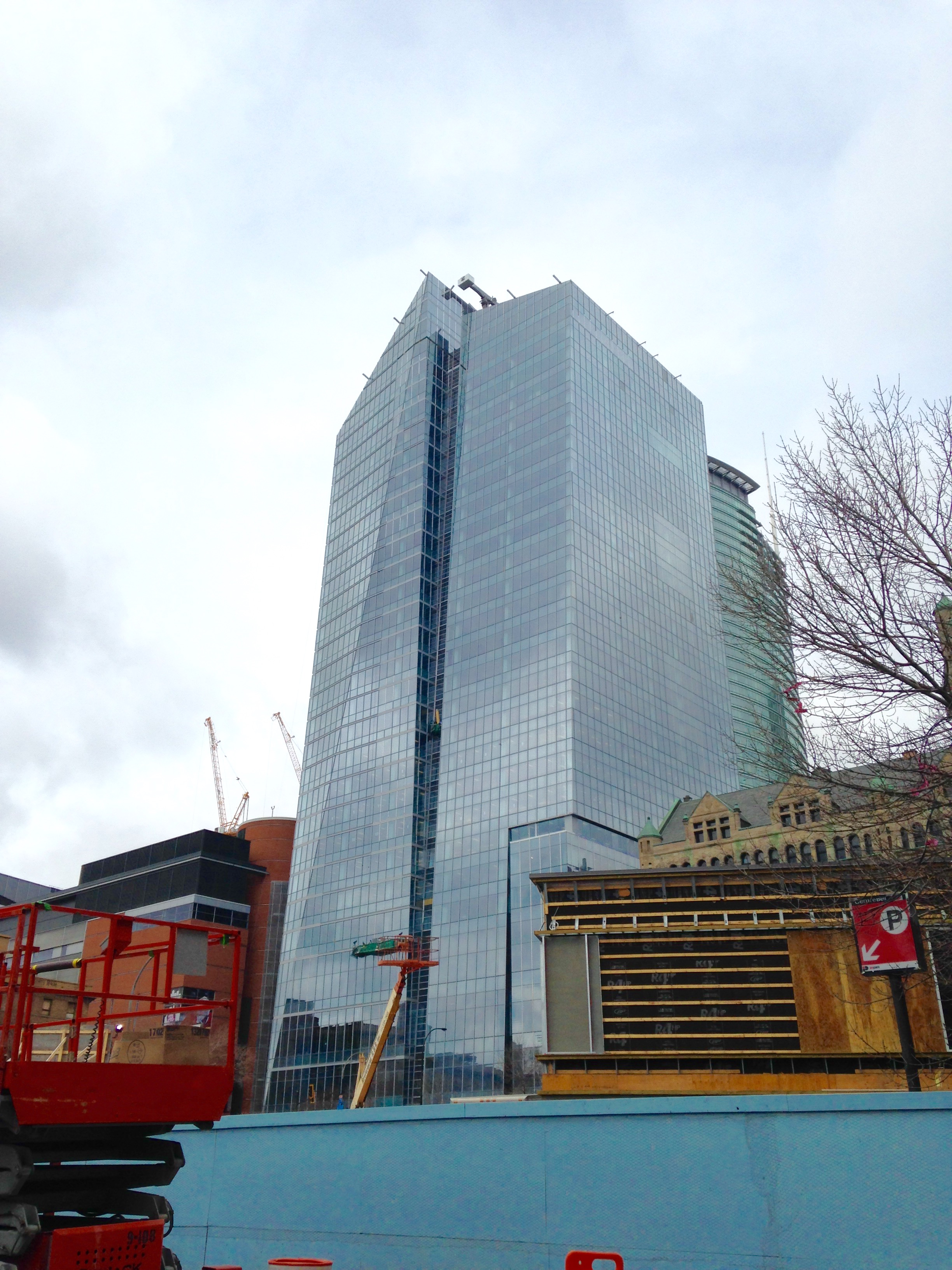
Construction site in April 2015
