= Saint Jacques Street =

Street in Montreal, Canada

Coordinates: 45°30′21″N 73°33′24″W

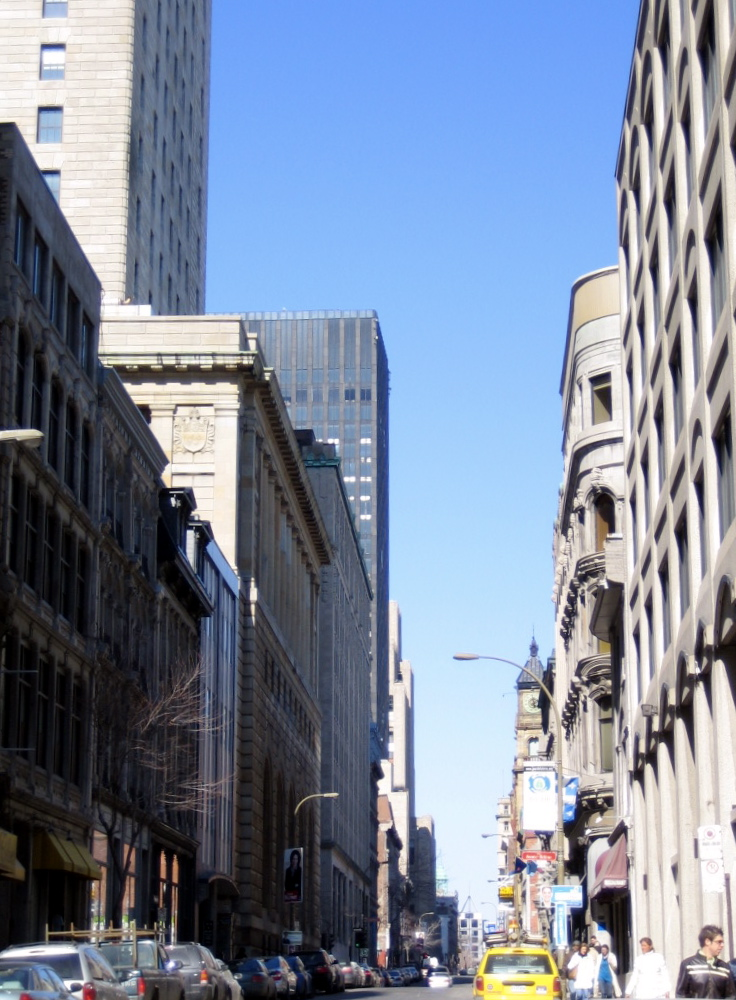
- Saint Jacques Street in Old Montreal
- Interactive map of Saint Jacques Street
- Native name: rue Saint-Jacques (French)
- Former name: St. James Street
- Part of: R-138 between Cavendish Boulevard and Saint Anne de Bellevue Boulevard
- Length: 4.7 km (2.9 mi)
- Location: Montreal
- West end: Saint Pierre Interchange with Autoroute 20, Lachine
- Major junctions: A-20 Saint-Pierre Interchange; A-15 Turcot Interchange; R-112 Peel Street; A-10 Robert-Bourassa Boulevard
- East end: Saint Laurent Boulevard, Old Montreal

Construction
- Inauguration: 1672

Saint Jacques Street (officially in French: rue Saint-Jacques, pronounced [ʁy sɛ̃ʒɑk]), or St. James Street, is a major street in Montreal, Quebec, Canada, running from Old Montreal westward to Lachine.

In 1818 the Bank of Montreal built its headquarters on St James, which began the development of the street as a major financial centre. Other financial companies that established head offices on St James included the Royal Bank of Canada, Banque canadienne nationale, Banque provinciale du Canada, Molsons Bank, Merchants Bank, Crédit foncier franco-canadien, Banque du peuple, City Bank of Montreal, Montreal City and District Savings Bank, Royal Trust Company, Crown Trust Company, and Nesbitt Thomson. Numerous British insurance companies had their Canadian head offices on St James. These included the Life Association of Scotland, Liverpool & London & Globe Insurance, Yorkshire Insurance, Standard Life, Colonial Life, Guardian Fire and Life, and London and Lancashire Insurance. Additionally, most financial companies based elsewhere established their Montreal offices on St James.

The street is commonly known by two names, St. James Street in English (after St. James's, London) and rue Saint-Jacques in French. Both names are used in English and French, although Saint-Jacques is the most common for geographical reference. St. James Street is usually used in reference to the street's historic importance as a financial district.

== History ==
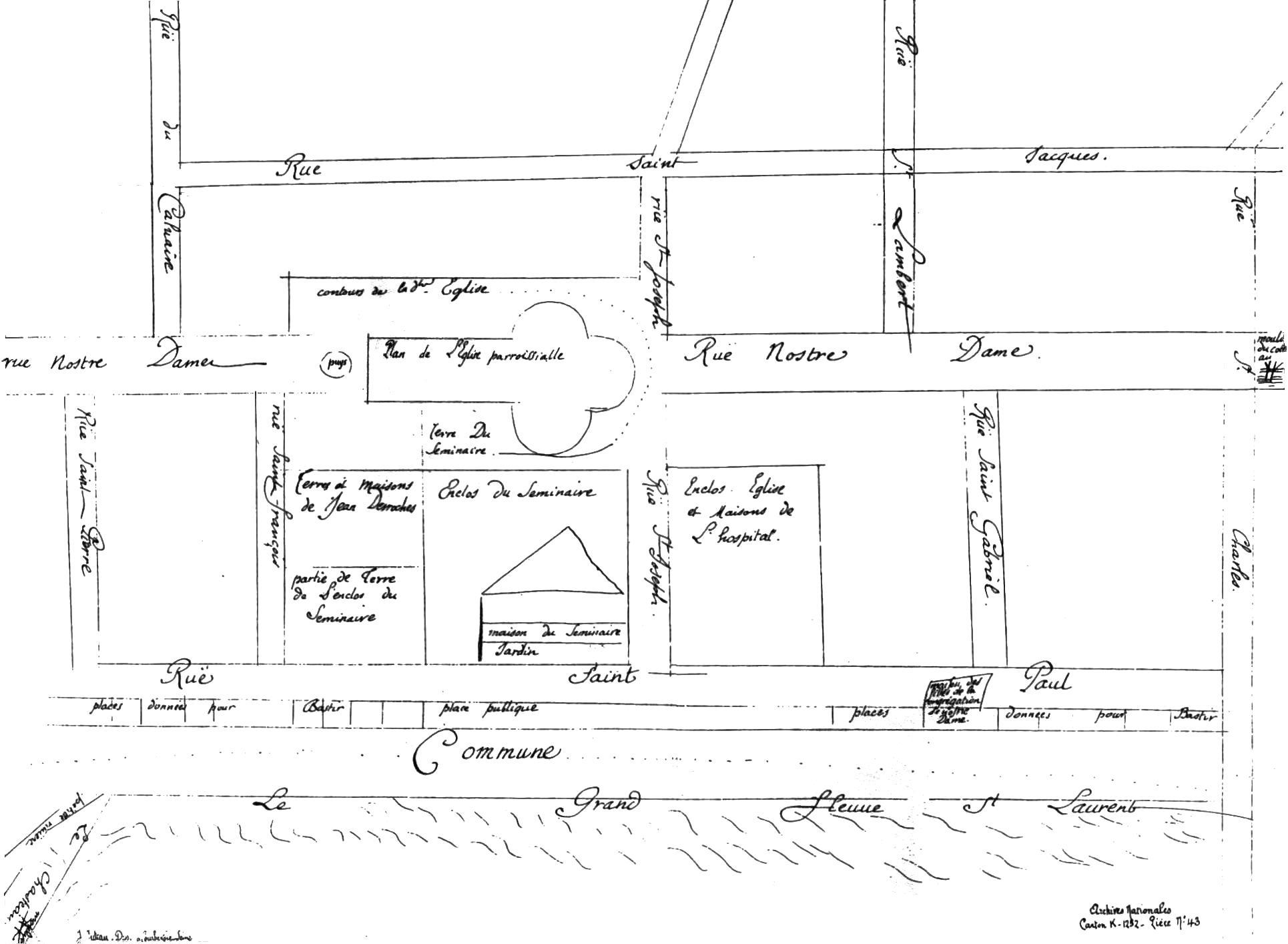
Montreal map drawn by François Dollier de Casson in 1672

A main thoroughfare passing through Old Montreal, the street was first opened in 1672. The portion between McGill Street and place Saint Henri was originally called Bonaventure Street (rue Saint-Bonaventure). This name has passed down to Place Bonaventure, Bonaventure Expressway, and Bonaventure Metro station, despite the disappearance of their original referents.

In the second half of the 19th century and the first half of the 20th century, St. James Street was the centre of Montreal's financial district and where several major English insurance, banking, and trust companies built their Canadian head offices. Prior to World War I, Canadian, provincial, and major municipal governments along with important industries such as the railways, public utility and canal companies obtained most of their capital financing in the United Kingdom or the United States. At the end of the War, St. James Street grew rapidly and although by the 1920s there were stock exchanges in Toronto, Winnipeg, Calgary and Vancouver, St. James Street's stock brokerage houses and the Montreal Stock Exchange were the most important in all of Canada. At the time of its construction in 1928, the Royal Bank of Canada's new headquarters at 360 St. James Street was the tallest building in the British Empire. The St James St. area was also the head office of the Bank of Montreal, and the informal head office of the Bank of Nova Scotia. It was also home to the major brokerage houses such as Nesbitt, Thomson and Company, Pitfield, MacKay, Ross, Royal Securities Corporation and others.

Some companies, past and present, located on St. James Street are:

- 50 : Ottawa Hotel, Montreal
- 60 : Versailles Building
- 100 : New York Life Insurance Company
- 105–107 : Royal Trust
- 119 : Bank of Montreal – main Montreal branch
- 201–215 : Canadian Pacific Express
- 210–212 : Yorkshire Insurance Company
- 215 : McMaster Meighen, lawyers
- 225 : National Trust Company
- 231–235 : Montreal Star
- 240 : Guardian Trust Company – The Dominion Bank
- 244 : Royal Securities Corporation
- 249–251 : Jones-Heward Financial Services
- 262–266 : Montreal City and District Savings Bank
- 265 : Canadian Bank of Commerce
- 275 : Canada Life
- 278–288 : Molson Bank
- 355 : Merchants Bank of Canada
- 360 : Royal Bank of Canada
- 388–390 : Sovereign Bank of Canada then Union Bank and Commercial Union Assurance Co.
- 393 : Crown Trust Company
- 437 : Eastern Townships Bank then the Commercial Union Assurance Co. and the Bank of Nova Scotia

East of Place d'Armes square, the street was home to two French-Canadian financial institutions, the Banque Canadienne Nationale and the Banque du Peuple, long gone now.

=== Decline ===
A number chose to gradually move their official head offices to Toronto, Ontario, while others shifted all future expansion to Toronto or other major Canadian centres. As a result, the St. James Street financial district has all but disappeared.

=== Recent history ===
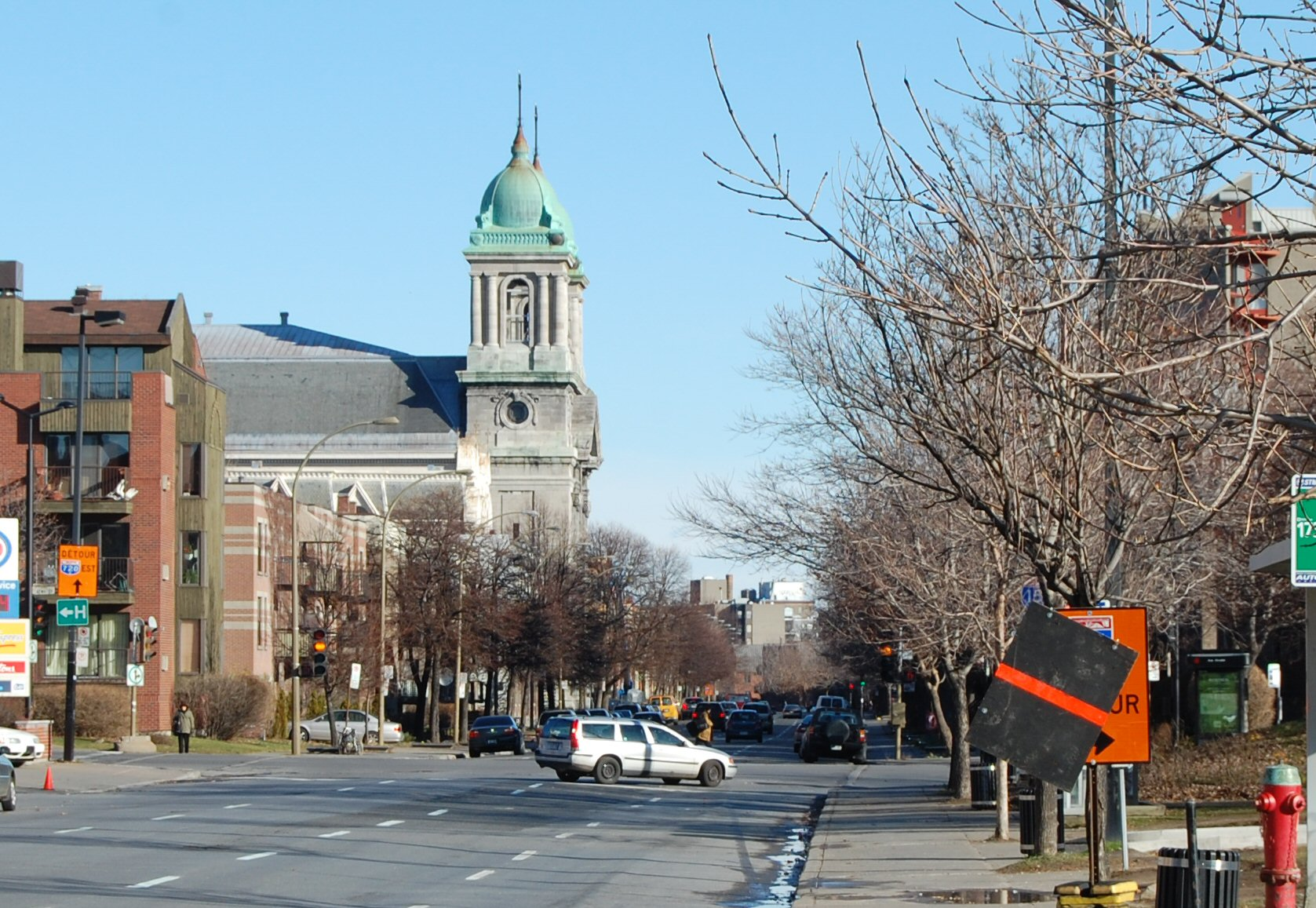
Saint Jacques Street in Little Burgundy

During the 1990s, the Montreal Expos baseball club unveiled plans to build a new stadium in downtown Montreal, right off St. Jacques Street, just south of the Bell Centre. When provincial funding for the new building fell through, the Expos did not continue with their plan and sold the property to developers. That stretch of Saint Jacques is now undergoing considerable gentrification.

Today, the stretch of St. Jacques Street between McGill Street and Saint Laurent Boulevard is still notable mostly for its grand Neo-Classical buildings on the part of the street running through the Old Montreal district. These include Bank of Montreal's domed Montreal Main Branch, the former headquarters of Royal Bank of Canada, the Canadian Bank of Commerce, the Molson Bank and the Canada Life Insurance Company. More modern buildings include the Montreal World Trade Centre and the Stock Exchange Tower.

Farther west, St. Jacques Street runs through the residential neighbourhoods of Little Burgundy, Saint-Henri, Notre-Dame-de-Grâce and Lachine, as well as the suburb of Montreal West, where it is instead known as Avon Road. Square-Victoria–OACI, Lionel-Groulx and Place-Saint-Henri Metro stations are located on St. Jacques, to the west, it gives access to Autoroute 20 in Notre-Dame-de-Grâce, where it passes through a largely industrial and large-surface commercial district at the top of the Falaise Saint-Jacques. The McGill University Health Centre superhospital fronts Saint-Jacques in Notre-Dame-de-Grâce.

== Buildings of St James Street ==
The following table shows buildings on St James Street beginning at its origin at boulevard Saint-Laurent. Buildings highlighted in red are demolished.

Address	Company/Building	Year	Architect	Image
Heading east from boulevard Saint-Laurent. (St James Street East disappeared in 1964 to make way for the new Palais de justice.)
7 St James East	Crédit foncier franco-canadien	1925 (demolished 1964)	Ernest Cormier and Joseph Daoust	
10 St James East	Trust & Loan Company of Canada	1909 (demolished 1964)	Joseph Lapierre	
19 St James East	Chambre de Commerce	1907 (demolished 1964)	Cox & Amos	
Heading west from boulevard Saint-Laurent
7 St James	La Presse	1899	Hutchison & Wood	
10 St James	Themis Building	1927	Perrault & Gadbois	
33–41 St James	Caisse nationale d'économie	1938	Payette & Crevier	
45 St James	Alexander Cross Building	1869	William Tutin Thomas	
55 St James	Banque du peuple	1893	Perrault, Mesnard et Venne	
60 St James	Versailles Building (Joseph Versailles)	1913	Ross and MacFarlane	
61 St James (701 place d'Armes)	Life Association of Scotland	1869	Hopkins & Wily	
100 St James (511 place d'Armes)	New York Life Insurance	1887	Babb, Cook & Willard	
Place d'Armes intersects
105 St James	City Bank of Montreal	1844 (reconstructed in 1888)	Cane, MacFarlane & Browne	
105 St James	Imperial Fire and Life Assurance Company (reconstruction of City Bank)	1888 (demolished 1912)	Charles William Clinton	
105 St James	Royal Trust Company	1912	McKim, Mead & White with Barott, Blackader & Webster	
119 St James	Bank of Montreal	1845	John Wells	
120 St James	Liverpool & London Fire and Life Assurance	1859 (demolished 1902)	Hopkins, Lawford & Nelson	
120 St James	Liverpool & London & Globe Insurance	1902 (demolished 1965)	Hutchison & Wood	
120 St James (500 place d'Armes)	Banque Canadienne Nationale	1965	David, Barott & Boulva	
129 St James	Bank of Montreal	1818 (demolished 1872)	Architect unknown	
129 St James	Post Office	1872 (demolished 1958)	Henri-Maurice Perrault	
129 St James	Bank of Montreal	1958	Barott, Marshall, Merett & Barott	
132 St James	Transportation Building	1910 (demolished 1965)	Carrère & Hastings with Ross & MacFarlane	
rue Saint-François-Xavier intersects
200 St James	Post Office	1853 (upper floors removed in 1911, demolished 1953)	John Wells	
200 St James	Kaplan Building	1953		
210 St James	Yorkshire Insurance	1910	Saxe & Archibald	
214 St James	Bank of British North America	1843 (demolished 1912)	George L. Dickinson	
214 St James	Bank of British North America	1912 (demolished 1989)	Barott, Blackader & Webster	
215 St James	Dominion Express Company	1911	Edward & William S. Maxwell	
221 St James	Royal Bank of Canada	1907	Howard Colton Stone	
225 St James	Colonial Life Assurance	1857 (demolished 1914)	James Key Springle	
225 St James	National Trust Company	1914	Kenneth Guscotte Rea	
235 St James	Standard Life	1883 (demolished 1922)	Richard Alfred Waite	
235 St James	Montreal Star	1929	Ross & Macdonald	
240 St James	Guardian Fire and Life	1902	Henry Ives Cobb with Finley & Spence	
241 St James	Montreal Star	1899	Alexander Francis Dunlop	
244 St James	Barron Block	1870 (burned down 1896)	Michel Laurent	
244 St James	London and Lancashire Life Assurance Company	1898	Edward & William S. Maxwell	
249 St James	Jones, Heward & Co.	1904	J.-B. Resther et Fils	
255 St James	Hanson Brothers	1928	Harold Lea Fetherstonhaugh	
261 St James	Citizens' Insurance	1874 (demolished 1902)	Hutchison & Steele	
261 St James	Metropolitan Bank	1903	Finley & Spence	
262 St James	Banque d'épargne de la cité et du district de Montréal	1870	Michel Laurent	
265 St James	Methodist Church	1843 (demolished 1888)	George L. Dickinson	
265 St James	Temple Buildings	1888 (demolished 1907)	Alexander Francis Dunlop	
265 St James	Canadian Bank of Commerce	1907	Darling and Pearson	
268 St James	Canada Life	1874 (demolished 1894)	Hopkins & Wily	
272 St James	S. Carsley Co. Ltd	1894 (demolished 1923)	Dunlop & Heriot	
272 St James	Insurance Exchange	1923	David Jerome Spence	
275 St James	Canada Life	1894	Richard Alfred Waite	
288 St James	Molsons Bank	1864	George Browne	
rue Saint-Pierre intersects
355 St James	Merchants Bank	1870	Hopkins & Wily	
(corner of St James and Saint Pierre)	Mechanics Hall	1853 (demolished ca. 1925)	Hopkins & Nelson	
(corner of St James and Dollard)	Bank of Ottawa	1903 (dismantled and rebuilt in 1928 at 4 rue Notre-Dame est)	Howard Colton Stone	
360 St James	Royal Bank of Canada	1926	York & Sawyer with Sumner Godfrey Davenport	
361 St James	A. & S. Nordheimer Co.	1888	John James Browne	
373 St James	Hutchison Building	1840		
384 St James	Savage, Lyman & Co.	1866	William Tutin Thomas	
388 St James	Sovereign Bank	1904	Howard Colton Stone	
393 St James	Crown Trust Company	1924	Philip John Turner	
408 St James	Ottawa Hotel	1845	George Browne	
414 St James	Bank of Toronto	1893 (demolished 1914)	Taylor & Gordon	
414 St James	Bank of Toronto	1914 (demolished 1960)	Hogle & Davis	
437 St James	Eastern Townships Bank	1907	Cox & Amos	
500 St James	Toronto-Dominion Bank	1960	Ross, Fish, Duschenes & Barrett	
McGill Street intersects
612 St James	Imperial Bank of Canada	1904 (reconstruction of Albert Building; demolished 1960)	Taylor, Hogle & Davis	
612 St James	Imperial Bank of Canada	1960	Ross, Fish, Duschenes & Barrett	
614 St James	Marcil Trust Company	1919 (demolished 1937)	Hogle & Davis	
614 St James	Guardian Trust Company	1938	Lawson & Little	
634 St James	Dominion Guarantee Company	1908	Ross & MacFarlane	

== Bibliography ==
- George B. Challies and Ross E. Hayes. St. James Street: A Study of the Development of St. James Street, 1642–1963. McGill University School of Architecture, 1963.
- Hugh Oddy. The Royal Trust Co. Building, 105 St. James Street West: McKim, Meade and White, 1912. McGill University School of Architecture, 1979.
- Adrian Shewchuk. The Temple Building: 1889–1907, St. James Street. McGill University School of Architecture, 1989.
