= Place Ville Marie =

Office skyscraper and shopping complex in Montreal, Quebec, Canada

- Place Ville Marie in 2016
- Former names: Royal Bank Tower

General information
- Type: Office
- Architectural style: International
- Location: 1 Place Ville Marie; Montreal, Quebec; H3B 2B6
- Coordinates: 45.5015°N 73.5684°W
- Construction started: 1958
- Completed: 1962
- Owner: Ivanhoé Cambridge
- Operator: Ivanhoé Cambridge

Height
- Roof: 188 m (617 ft)

Technical details
- Floor count: 47
- Floor area: 95,922 m^{2} (1,032,500 sq ft)
- Lifts/elevators: 32

Design and construction
- Architects: I.M. Pei & Partners; Dimitri Dimakopoulos
- Developer: William Zeckendorf
- Structural engineer: Severud Associates
- Main contractor: Foundation Company of Canada

Website
- www.placevillemarie.com/fr

Place Ville Marie (French pronunciation: [plas vil maʁi], abbr. PVM) is a large office and shopping complex skyscraper in Downtown Montreal, Quebec, Canada, comprising four office buildings and an underground shopping plaza. The main building, 1 Place Ville Marie (formerly Royal Bank Tower from its anchor tenant), was built in the International style in 1962 as the headquarters for the Royal Bank of Canada. While RBC's corporate headquarters and the majority of its management operations have been based in Toronto's Royal Bank Plaza since 1976, Place Ville Marie remains RBC's head office, a distinct title from its corporate headquarters. It is a 188 m (617 ft), 47-storey, cruciform office tower. The complex is a nexus for Montreal's Underground City (RÉSO), the world's busiest, with indoor access to over 1,600 businesses, numerous subway stations, a suburban transportation terminal, and tunnels extending throughout downtown. A counter-clockwise rotating beacon on the rooftop lights up at night, illuminating the surrounding sky with up to four white horizontal beams that can be seen as far as 50 kilometres (31 mi) away. This beacon is not considered as a NAVAID for aviation purposes.

== Buildings ==
The name "Place Ville Marie" is often used to refer to the cruciform building only, but it also applies to four shorter office buildings which were built around it in 1963 and '64, and to the urban plaza which lies on top of the largest section of the shopping promenade, and between the buildings. From a postal point of view the cruciform tower is "1, Place Ville Marie" and the lesser buildings around it are "2, Place Ville Marie" and so on. The buildings and the plaza have been given many facelifts over the years. In the latest facelift, much of the grey concrete and terrazzo of the plaza was covered with grass, flowers and shrubs. The complex has 3,384,000 sq ft (314,384 m^{2}) of space and parking for about 900 vehicles. There are about 70 tenants with 3,000 employees. Via Rail has its headquarters in "3, Place Ville Marie".

== Site ==
Underground shopping center in Place Ville Marie

The location of Place Ville Marie was originally a vast railway trench gouged in the flank of Mount Royal between the southern portal of Canadian National Railway's Mount Royal Tunnel and Central Station. Most of the building was thus built over the tracks, requiring the structure to be more resistant to vibrations than normally required. As a result, it is the most earthquake-resistant office tower in Montreal.

All of the land bounded by Cathcart Street, Dorchester Boulevard (now René Lévesque Boulevard), University Street (now Robert-Bourrassa Street) and Mansfield Street was owned by the CNR, Railways, with the exception of the venerable St. James Club at the corner of Dorchester and University. Developer William Zeckendorf offered the club the top floor of the Place Ville Marie tower in exchange for their property, but was turned down.

== History ==
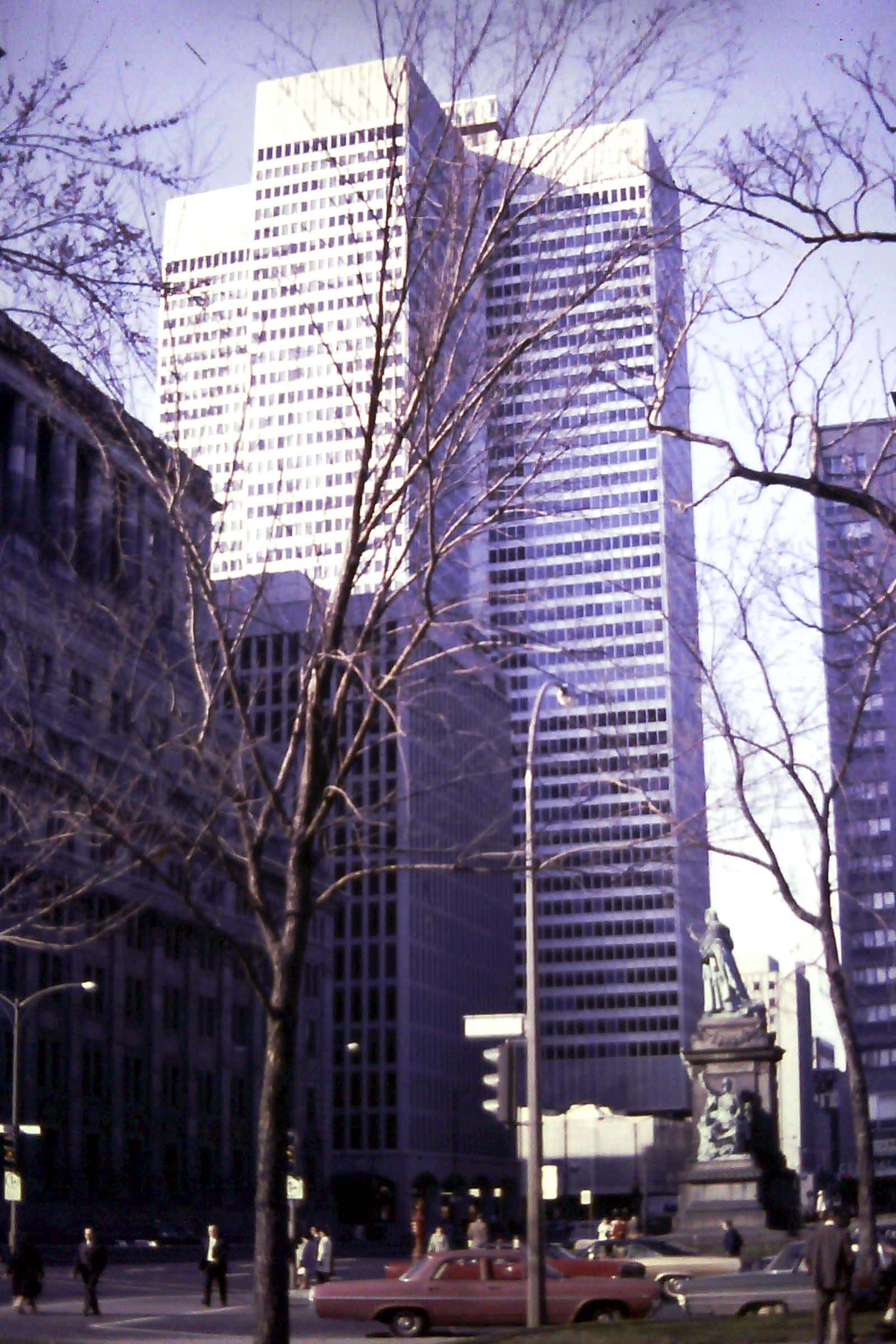
Place Ville-Marie in 1967.

Place Ville Marie was one of the first built projects of Henry N. Cobb, a founding partner of Pei Cobb Freed & Partners. His design was controversial from the start, given its proximity to many Montreal landmarks and the vast changes it would bring to the downtown core.

According to design historian Mark Pimlott, "The most radical aspect of the Place Ville Marie project was that nearly one-half of its 280,000-square-metre area was beneath street level [...] deriving the obvious benefit of being protected from Montréal’s extreme winter and summer climate." Its vast network and multi-purpose is juxtaposed with a continuous interior "with episodes of civic gravity and monumentality".

At the time of construction, the main tower was known as the tallest skyscraper in the Commonwealth, and was the third tallest skyscraper on Earth outside the United States. The equivalent of three floors was added late in the project to ensure that this building would not be topped by the neighboring Tour CIBC which was built at the same time.

Conceived and built at a time when Montreal was the metropolis of Canada, the structure's largest occupant and anchor tenant was the head office of the Royal Bank of Canada, the country's largest bank, which moved from its previous head office at 360 St Jacques in Old Montreal. The second new large corporate tenant was the Aluminum Company of Canada (Alcan) who established in November 1962 occupying 6 floors of the building. The central plaza became an important new public space in downtown Montreal, hosting an historic election rally for Pierre Elliott Trudeau during the 1968 federal election.

Developer William Zeckendorf founded Trizec Properties in order to build Place Ville Marie. He lost a bet to then Royal Bank President Earle McLaughlin, making payment in full (US$0.10) in an elaborate dime encased in acrylic. Exactly what the bet concerned is unknown.

In 1975 Air Canada's headquarters were at 1 Place Ville Marie.

Mayor Jean Drapeau chose the name himself. Ville-Marie was the name of the Catholic colony founded at what is now Montreal in 1642.

== Legacy ==
On 12 March 1976 Canada Post issued 'Place Ville Marie and Notre-Dame Church' designed by Jean Mercier & Pierre Mercieron. The $1 stamps are perforated 13.5 × 13 and were printed by British American Bank Note Company.

== Other information ==
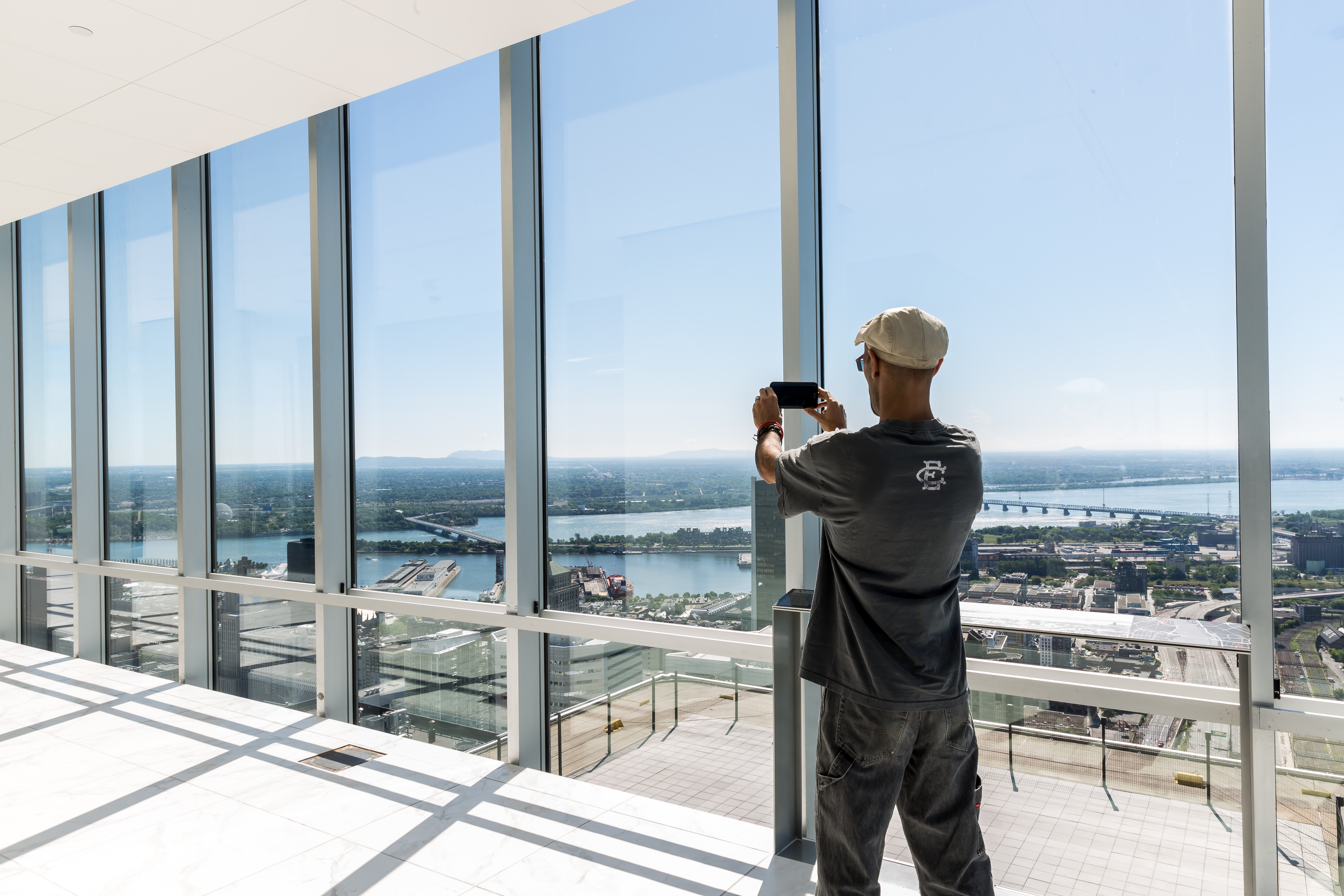
Observation deck closed in 2020

Sora Café in 45/F

The penthouse was home to the Restaurant Club Lounge Altitude 737 restaurant and nightclub, that opened onto a rooftop terrace. The club, which was named for its elevation in feet from sea level, was one of the most famous in the city, and featured one of the most unusual dance floors, which twisted and turned around, and spanned two floors. It later became home to the 360 Observatory, which suspended its operations on 13 March 2020 and announced permanent closure on 3 May 2020. The entire place was replaced with a fine dining restaurant and a cafe.

During the holiday season, a large artificial Christmas tree is installed in the central court. The plaza has a large fountain with programmed water jets and a large abstract sculpture at its centre: "Feminine Landscape" by Gerald Gladstone.

The complex is currently owned by Ivanhoé Cambridge, a division of the Caisse de dépôt et placement du Québec (CDP Capital), who bought the building in March 2000 for CA$450 million.

The building can be seen in the film Scanners II: The New Order in a few scenes.

== Tenants ==
Place Ville-Marie office lobby

Basement Food Court-Le Cathcart

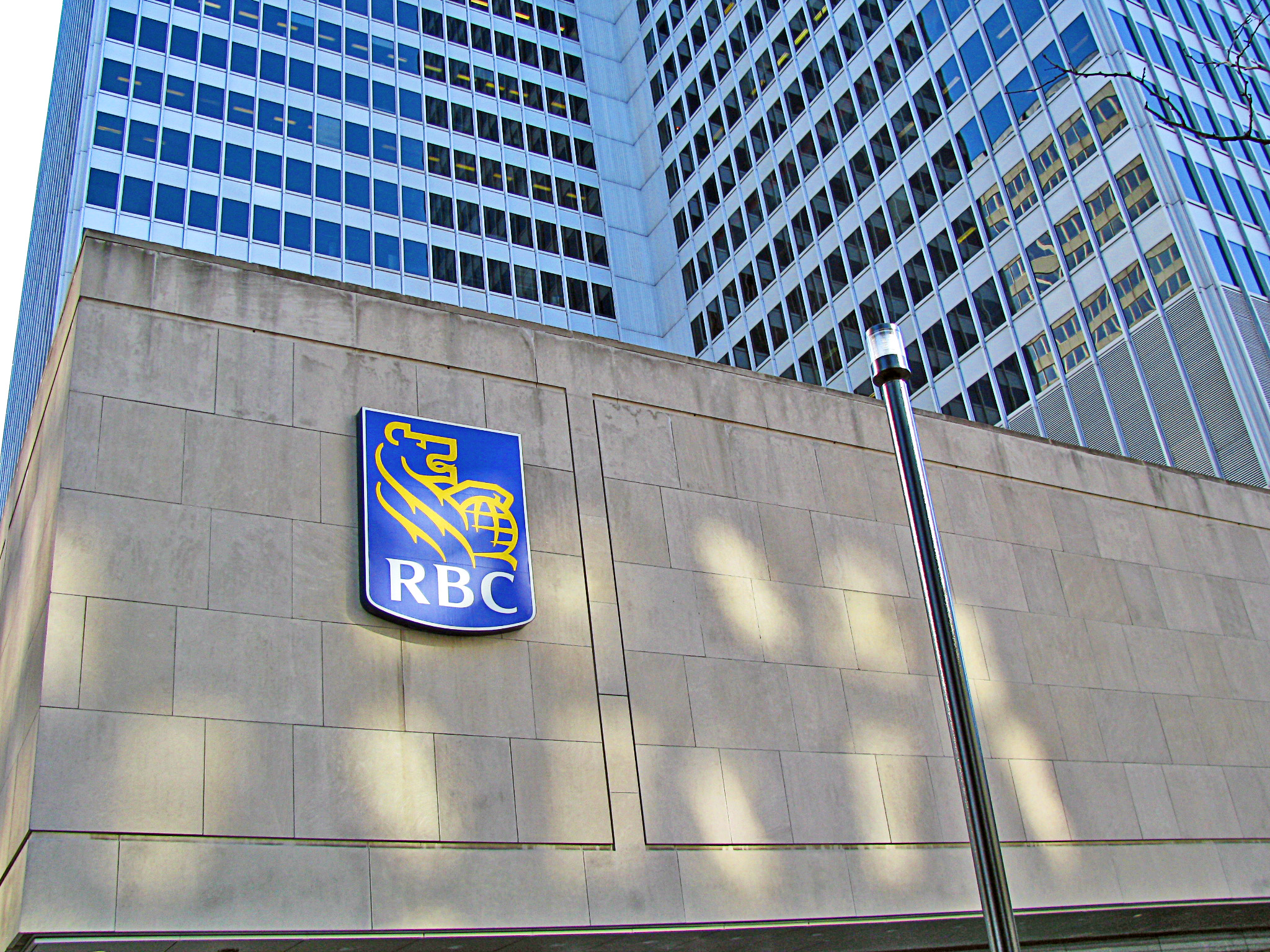
The Royal Bank of Canada has several offices located at 1 Place Ville-Marie

=== 1 Place Ville-Marie ===
- Alcoa Canada
- Arup Group
- Blake, Cassels & Graydon LLP
- CIBC Wood Gundy
- Desjardins Securities
- Economical Insurance
- Fraser Milner Casgrain LLP
- Gowlings
- Norton Rose Canada LLP
- RBC Capital Markets
- RBC Dexia
- RBC Dominion Securities
- RBC Wealth Management
- IBM

=== 2-3 Place Ville-Marie ===
- EA Montreal
- Via Rail
- WeWork

Sekure Merchant Solutions

=== 5 Place Ville-Marie ===
- Cogeco
- Hatch Ltd
- Business Development Bank of Canada
- SAP SE

== See also ==
- List of malls in Montreal
- List of tallest buildings in Montreal
- Montreal underground city malls
- Royal Bank Plaza in Toronto
- Tour de la Banque Royale
