= Royal Bank Tower (Montreal) =

Skyscraper at 360 Saint-Jacques Street in Montreal, Quebec

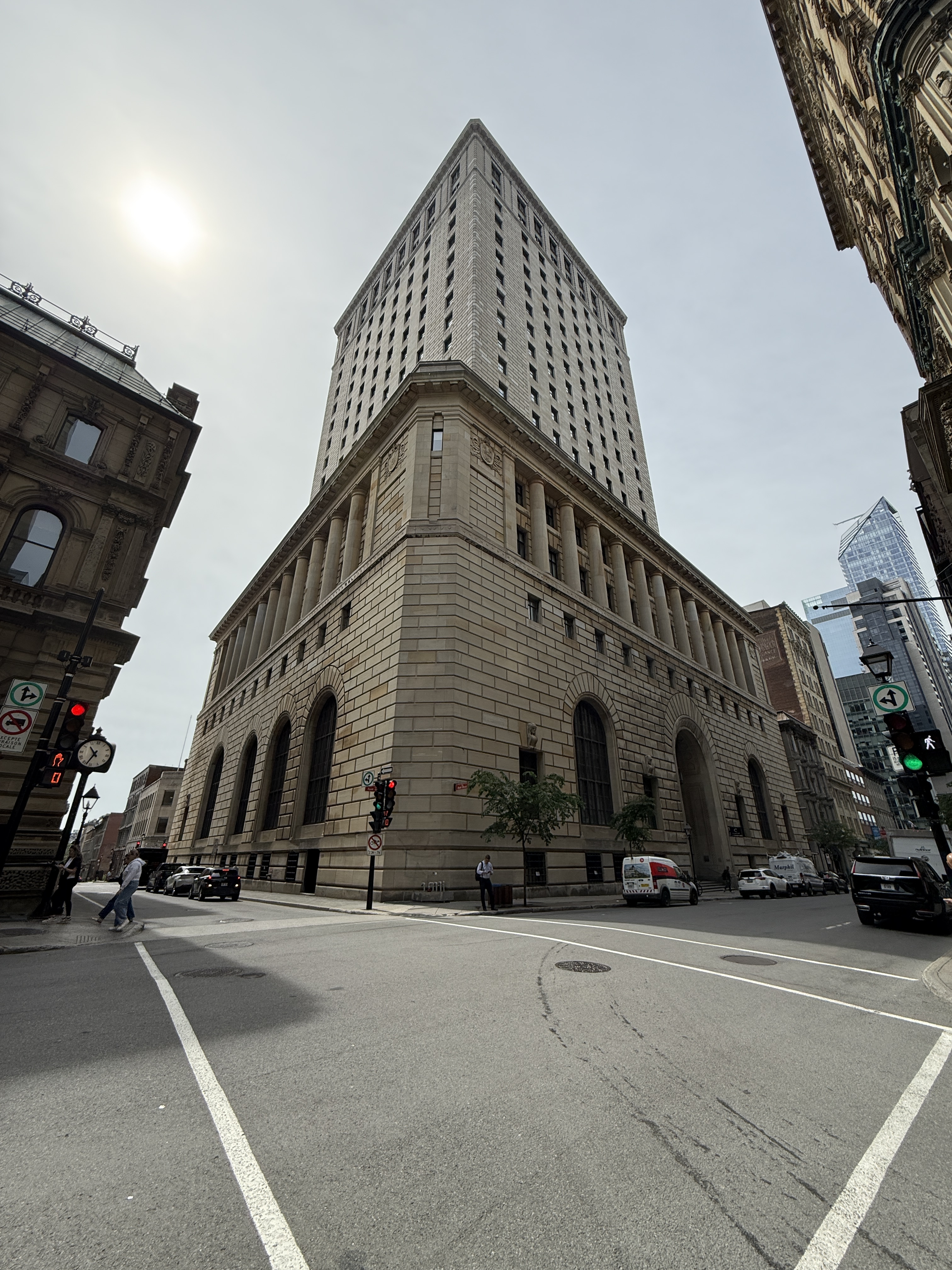
- Exterior of the building (2026)
- Interactive map of the Royal Bank Tower area
- Alternative names: Tour de la Banque Royale

Record height
- Tallest in the British Empire from 1928 to 1929^{[I]}
- Preceded by: Old City Hall (Toronto)
- Surpassed by: Fairmont Royal York Hotel

General information
- Type: Office
- Location: 360 Saint-Jacques Street; Montreal, Quebec
- Coordinates: 45.5019°N 73.5594°W
- Construction started: 1927
- Completed: 1928

Height
- Roof: 121 m (397 ft)

Technical details
- Floor count: 22
- Floor area: 344,400 sq ft (32,000 m^{2})
- Lifts/elevators: 8

Design and construction
- Architects: York, Sawyer of New York and Sumner Godfrey Davenport of Montreal (as Chief Architect for the Royal Bank)

The Royal Bank Tower is a skyscraper at 360 Saint-Jacques Street in Montreal, Quebec. The 22-storey 121 m (397 ft) neo-classical tower was designed by the firm of York and Sawyer with the bank's chief architect Sumner Godfrey Davenport of Montreal. The bank vault was designed by Frederick S. Holmes. Upon completion in 1928, it was the tallest building in the entire British Empire, the tallest structure in all of Canada and the first building in the city that was taller than Montréal's Notre-Dame Basilica built nearly a century before.

The bank's first official head office was at Hollis and George in Halifax in 1879. In 1907 the Royal Bank of Canada moved its head office from Halifax to Montreal. As its original building on Saint-Jacques Street turned out to be too small, in 1926 the board of directors of the biggest bank in Canada hired New York architects York and Sawyer to build a prestigious new building a short distance westward. Between 1920 and 1926 the bank had bought up all the property between Saint-Jacques, Saint-Pierre, Notre-Dame and Dollard Streets to demolish all the buildings there including the old Mechanics' Institute and the ten-storey Bank of Ottawa building in order to make space for the new 22-storey building.

In 1962, the Royal Bank moved its main office to another famous Montreal building, Place Ville-Marie, however kept a branch in the impressive main hall of the old building, situated in Old Montreal. That branch relocated to the nearby Tour de la Bourse in July 2012.

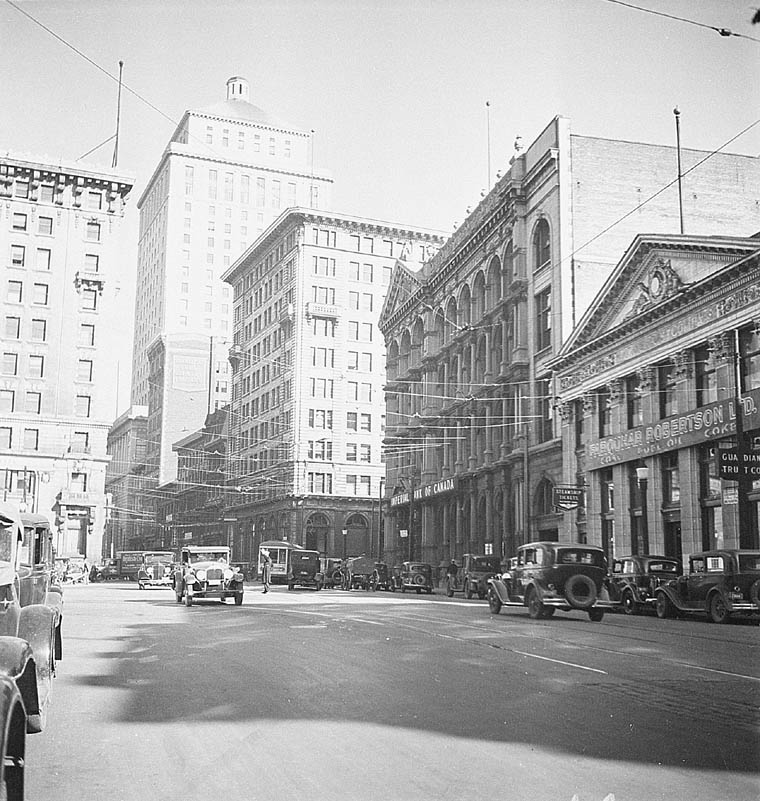
Saint-Jacques street with the Royal Bank building (the tallest), 1935

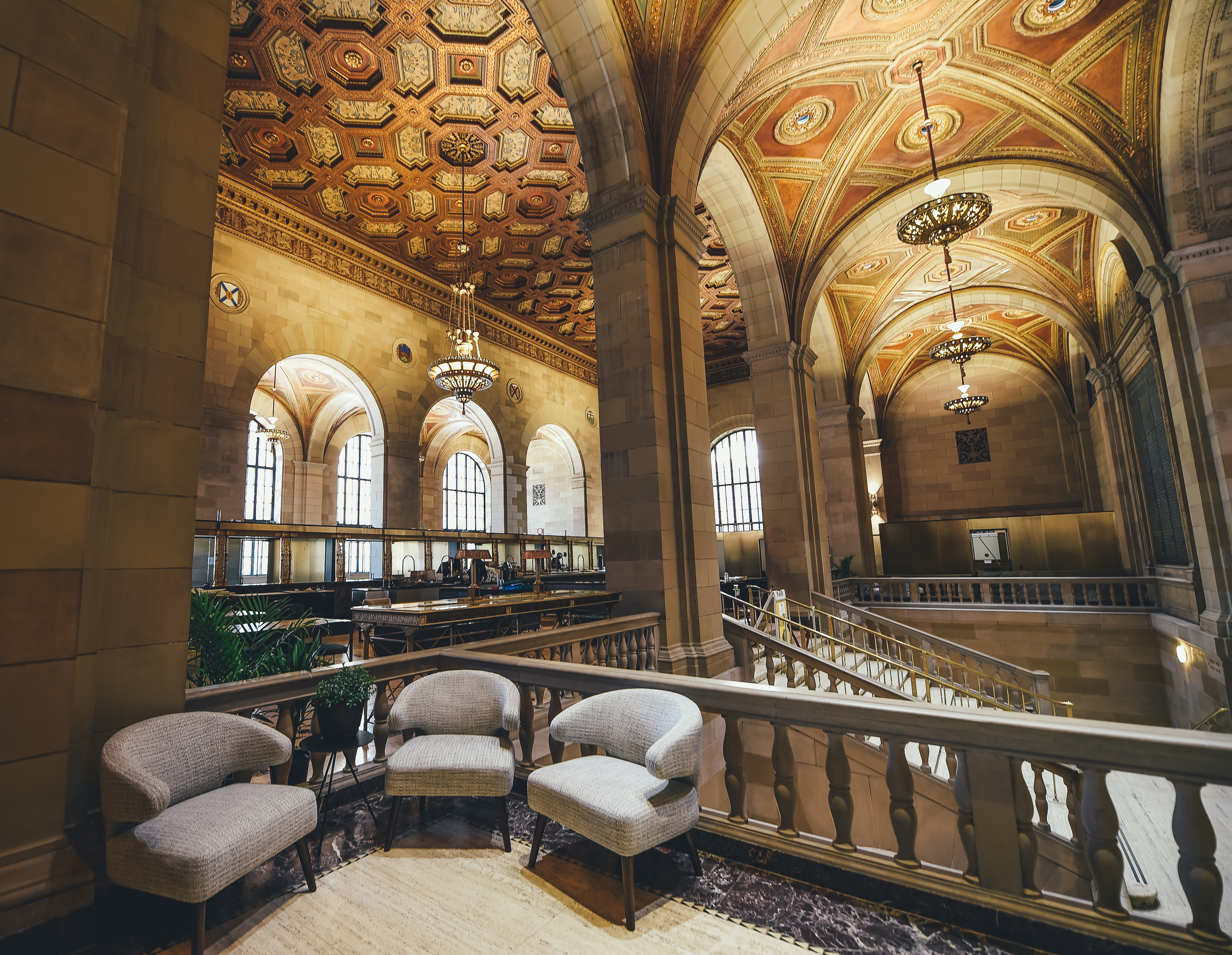
Lobby with high ceiling design

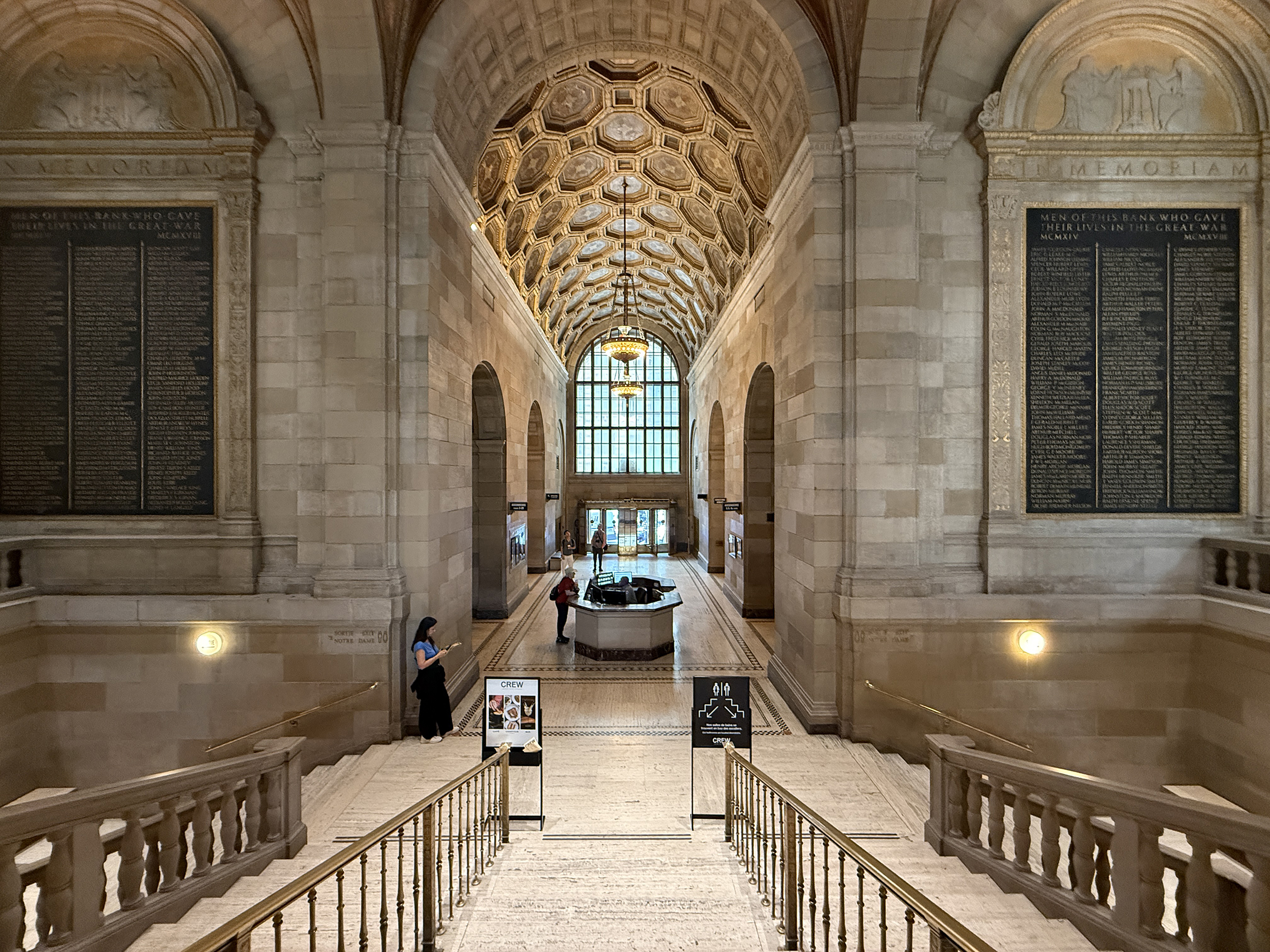
Lift lobby

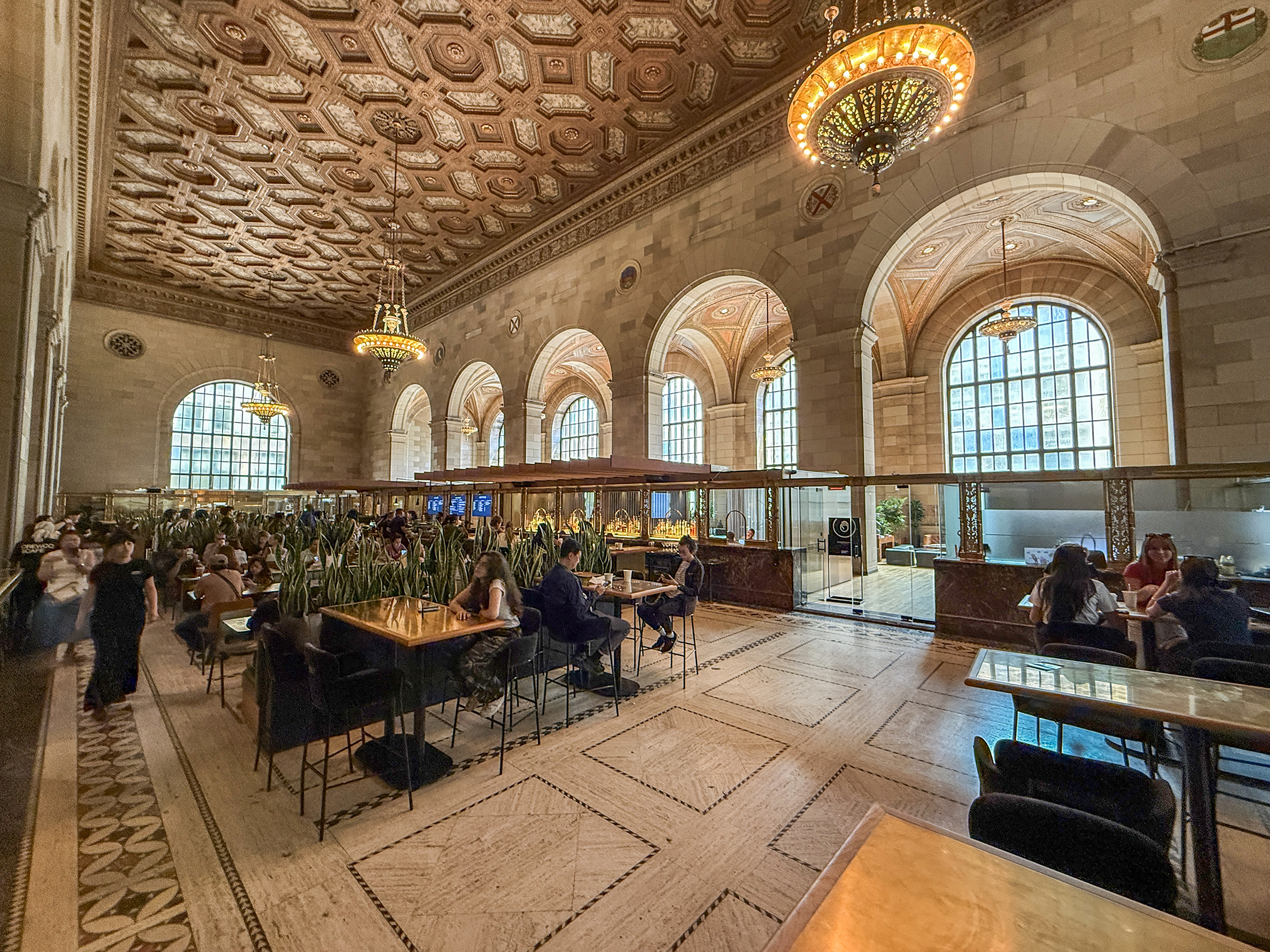
Crew Collective & Cafe

== See also ==
- Bank of Montreal Head Office, Montreal
- Molson Bank Building, Montreal
- Tour CIBC
- Old Canadian Bank of Commerce Building, Montreal
- Royal Bank Plaza - RBC corporate offices in Toronto
