= Old Canadian Bank of Commerce Building =

Coordinates: 45.503°N 73.559°W

The Canadian Imperial Bank of Commerce Building (or Édifice Canadian Imperial Bank of Commerce) is a building at 265 Saint-Jacques Street in Montreal, Quebec, Canada.

== History ==
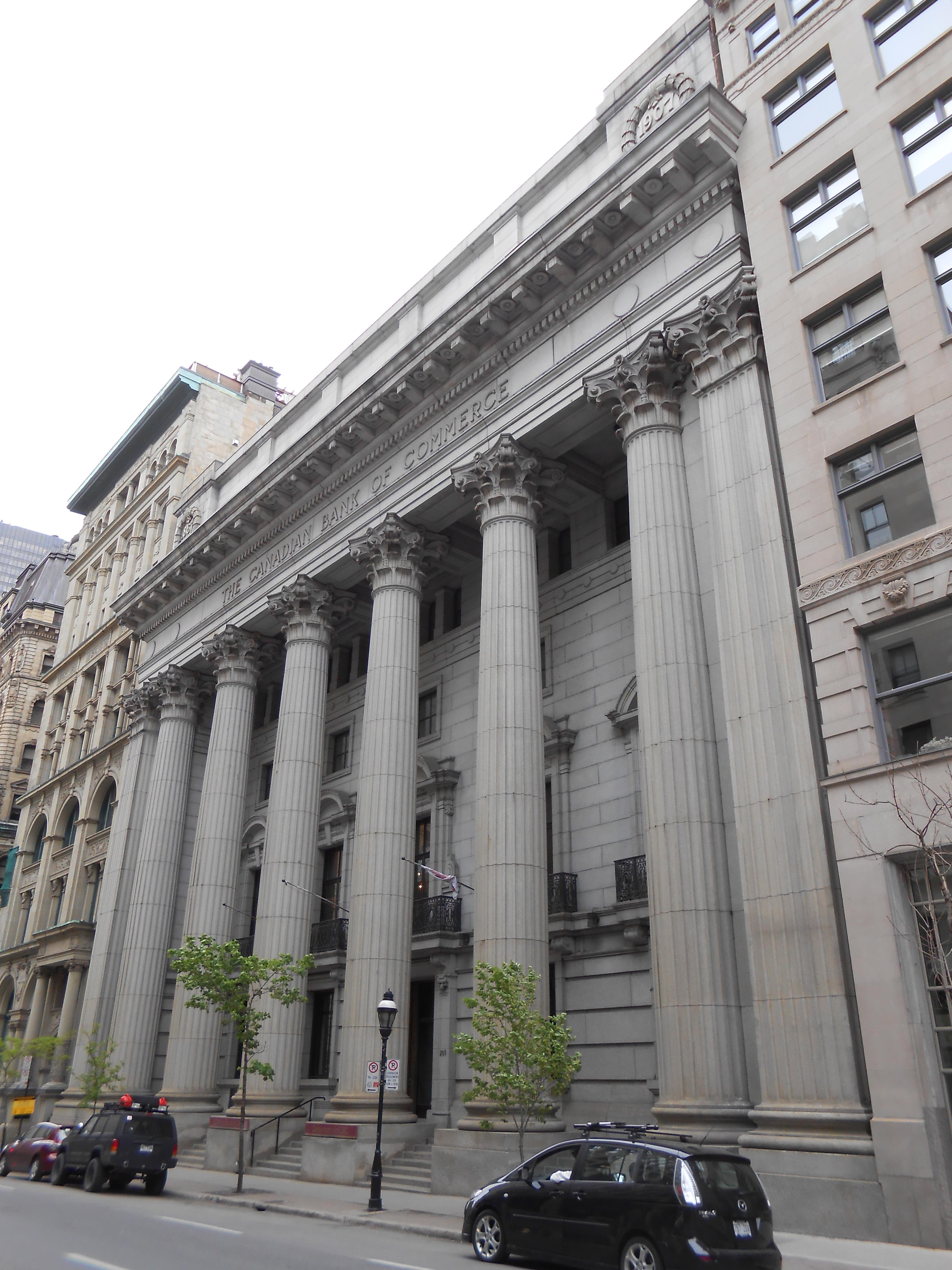
The old Canadian Imperial Bank of Commerce Building on Saint Jacques Street in Old Montreal.

The building was built in 1906-1909. The five-storey building was designed by Darling and Pearson in the Edwardian Baroque style and is fronted by a monumental hexastyle Corinthian portico carved from grey Stanstead granite from Stanstead in Quebec's Eastern Townships. The building was constructed as the main Montreal branch of the Canadian Bank of Commerce (which merged with the Imperial Bank of Canada in 1961 to form the Canadian Imperial Bank of Commerce). CIBC main offices in Montreal left the building in 1962 when the CIBC Tower was completed, but the built an active branch until it was sold in 2010.

In 2012, the owners of the Montreal landmark, The Rialto Theatre, purchased the former bank and crowned it The St. James Theatre. While staying true to the history of the building and highlighting its architecture, the St. James Theatre is one of Montreal newest high-end venues for private events.

The building housed the Montreal offices of the White Star Line from 1909 to 1939. It is where the tickets for the RMS Titanic were sold.

Prior to this, the site was occupied by the Temple Building from 1889 to 1890 and St. James Church from 1845 to 1888.

== See also ==
Other banking offices in Montreal:

- Bank of Montreal Head Office, Montreal
- Old Royal Bank Building, Montreal
- Molson Bank Building, Montreal

Other CIBC offices in Canada:

- Commerce Court
- Tour CIBC
- Commerce Place I and Commerce Place II
