= Canada Life Building, Montreal =

Building in Montreal, Quebec, Canada

Canada Life Building
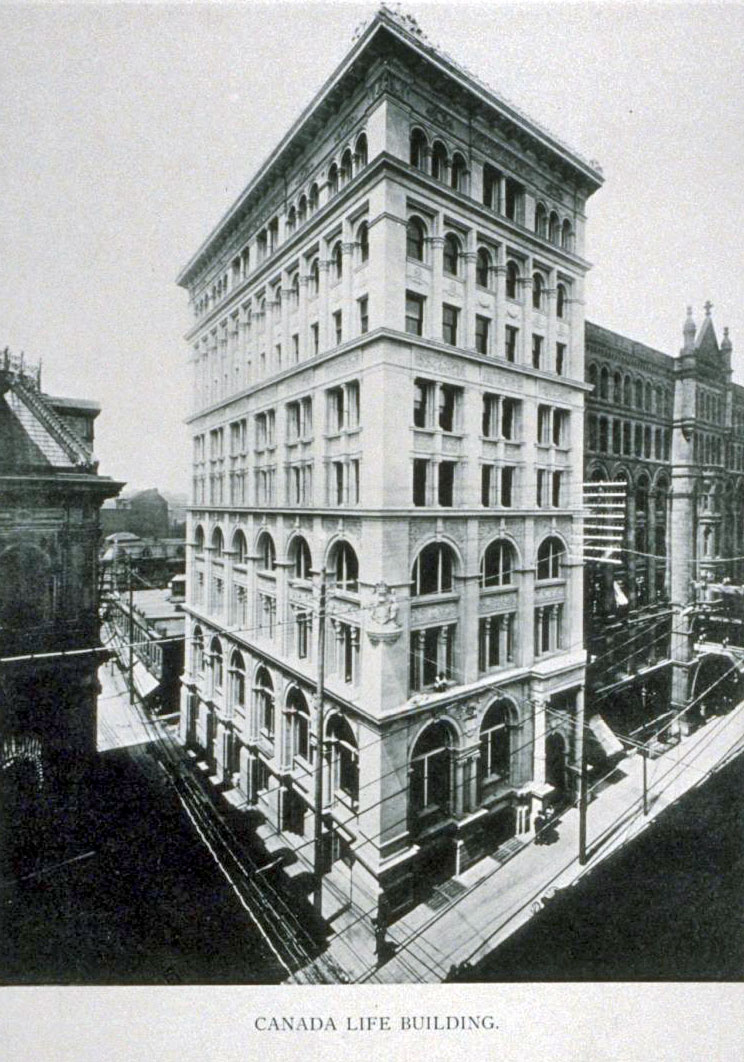
- Photo of the then-new building, 1898

- Location within Montreal

General information
- Status: Completed
- Location: 275 Saint Jacques Street, Montreal, Quebec, Canada
- Coordinates: 45.5029°N 73.5595°W

Design and construction
- Architect: Richard A. Waite

Patrimoine culturel du Québec
- Type: Immeuble patrimonial classé
- Designated: 2002-09-10
- Part of: Montreal Heritage Site
- Reference no.: 93433

The Canada Life Building in Montreal, Quebec, Canada, is a Renaissance Revival building completed in 1895 by Buffalo, New York architect Richard A. Waite and is an example of a first-generation skyscraper.

Located in the heart of what was once Canada's financial capital on St. James Street, in what is now Old Montreal, the Canada Life Building was the first in Montreal to utilize an eight-storey steel structure.
