= CIBC Tower =

Office skyscraper in Montreal, Quebec, Canada

- La Tour CIBC
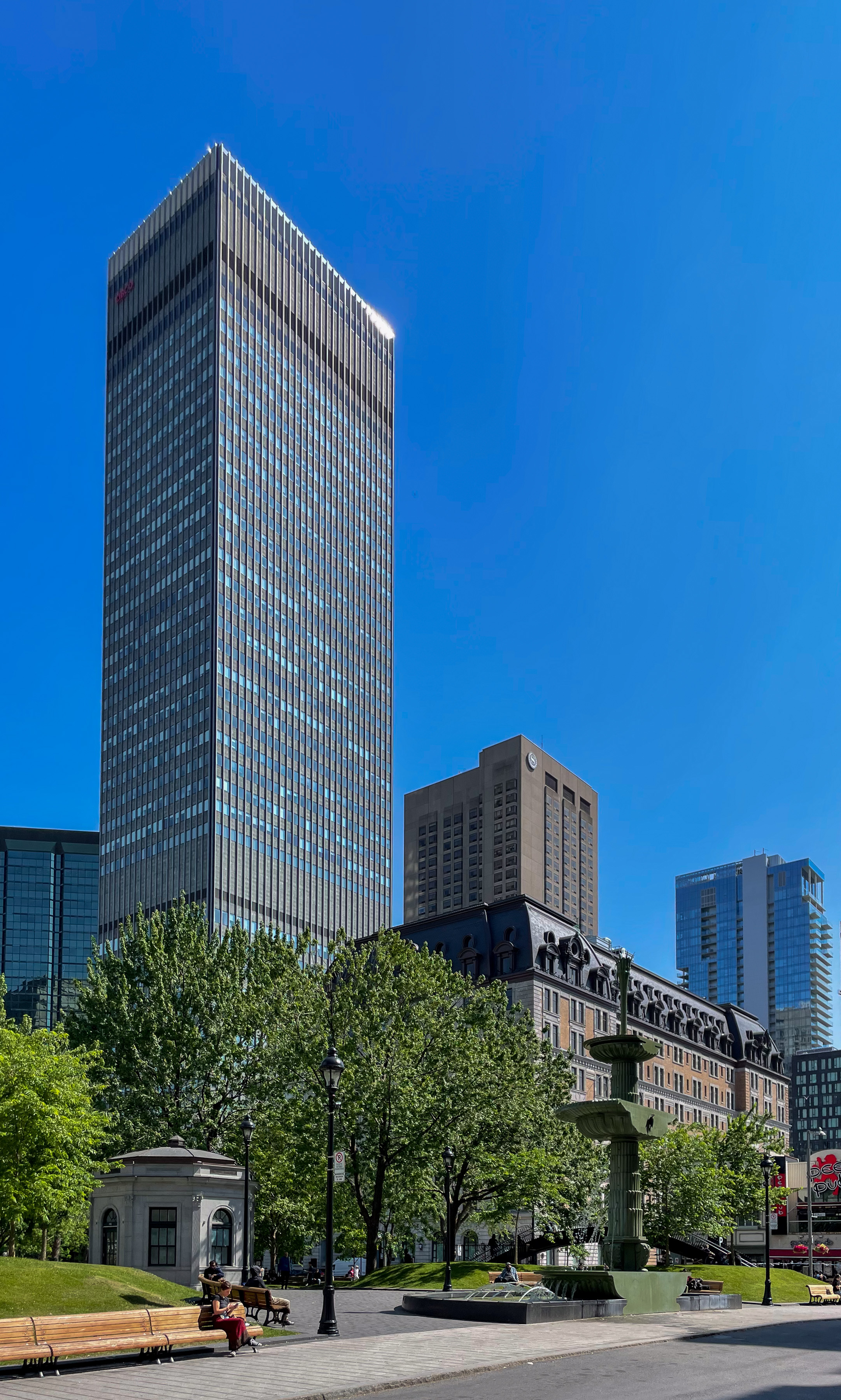
- CIBC Tower and Dorchester Square
- Interactive map of the CIBC Tower area
- Alternative names: Canadian Imperial Bank of Commerce Building

General information
- Type: Commercial offices
- Architectural style: International
- Location: 1155 René Lévesque Boulevard West; Montreal, Quebec
- Coordinates: 45.4985°N 73.5709°W
- Completed: 1962
- Owner: British Columbia Investment Management Corporation
- Management: British Columbia Investment Management Corporation

Height
- Roof: 187 m (614 ft)

Technical details
- Floor count: 45
- Floor area: 54,154 m^{2} (582,910 sq ft)
- Lifts/elevators: Turnbull Elevator Co. Ltd (No. 16)

Design and construction
- Architects: Peter Dickinson and Ross, Fish, Duschenes and Barrett
- Developer: CIBC

Website
- groupepetra.com/eng/properties/view?id=19

CIBC Tower (French: Tour CIBC) is a 187 m (614 ft) 45-storey skyscraper in Montreal, Quebec, Canada. The International Style office tower was built by Peter Dickinson, with associate architects Ross, Fish, Duschenes and Barrett, and was the city's tallest building from 1962 to 1963. The building holds offices for the Canadian Imperial Bank of Commerce, the corporate law firm Stikeman Elliott, the Canadian accounting firm MNP LLP, as well as numerous other businesses.

The building is located at 1155 René Lévesque Boulevard West next to Dorchester Square facing the imposing but dwarfed Sun Life Building. Part of the fire-damaged Windsor Hotel was demolished to make room for construction, with the remaining portion being converted to offices in the 1980s.

== History ==
The project was initiated by the Canadian Bank of Commerce and announced in 1959. While the building was under construction, the Bank of Commerce merged with the Imperial Bank of Canada to form the Canadian Imperial Bank of Commerce, effective June 1, 1961. The Imperial Bank abandoned its concurrent plan for a new head office at 612 McGill Street; that building was instead occupied by Crédit foncier franco-canadien, and since 1988 by Quebecor.

Completed in 1962, a few months before Place Ville-Marie, the CIBC Tower was the tallest building in Canada and the entire Commonwealth of Nations when it was first built, until being surpassed later that year by Place Ville-Marie where a penthouse was added by the competing Royal Bank for that express purpose.

The Consulate of Israel was on the 26th floor of the building and as such, it was sometimes the site of demonstrations related to the Israeli–Palestinian conflict. The consulate has since relocated to Westmount Square in Westmount.

== Architecture ==
The tower is exceptionally slender with only 1,400 m^{2} (15,000 sq ft) of gross floor area per floor, because of a zoning regulation limiting the total building floor area to twelve times the property area. Its façade is more ornamental than that of the average International style tower, with horizontal strips of glass curtain wall alternating with spandrels of various types of stone, including green slate that was quarried in Wales. The building was fully renovated in 1991, and the highly visible CIBC logo at the top was redesigned in 2004 and again in 2013.

Inside, levels 15 and 29 are transfer floors; level 16 is a triple-height mechanical floor that is skipped in the floor numbering of the passenger elevators. Levels 42-44 are also mechanical floors; level 45 was originally an indoor observation deck but was closed in the 1970s. The top 7 m (23 ft) of the tower are actually an open-air raised partition, built sometime after construction, that hides the rooftop elevator control rooms. Without this extra structure, the actual roof height is 184 m (604 ft), and approximately 187 m (614 ft) when counting the elevator penthouse. It is the fifth tallest building in Montreal, but an antenna raises the total height to 250 m (820 ft), the tallest pinnacle in Montreal.

Until the end of 2018, French-language radio station CKOI-FM transmitted its 307,000 watt signal from atop the building. The antenna has since been removed.

== Tenants ==
- Canadian Imperial Bank of Commerce
- Minerai de fer Quebec
- Euler Hermes
- Macquarie Group
- Russell Investments
- Stikeman Elliott LLP
- Vilaron Corporation
- Linkeo.com
- MNP LLP
- ACE Aviation Holdings
- Parkland Fuel Corporation

== See also ==
- List of tallest buildings in Montreal
- Old Royal Bank Building, Montreal
- Molson Bank Building, Montreal
- Bank of Montreal Head Office, Montreal
- Old Canadian Bank of Commerce Building, Montreal
- Commerce Court, Toronto
- Commerce Place I and Commerce Place II
