= Montreal Star Building =

Building complex in Montreal, Canada

Coordinates: 45.5036°N 73.5589°W

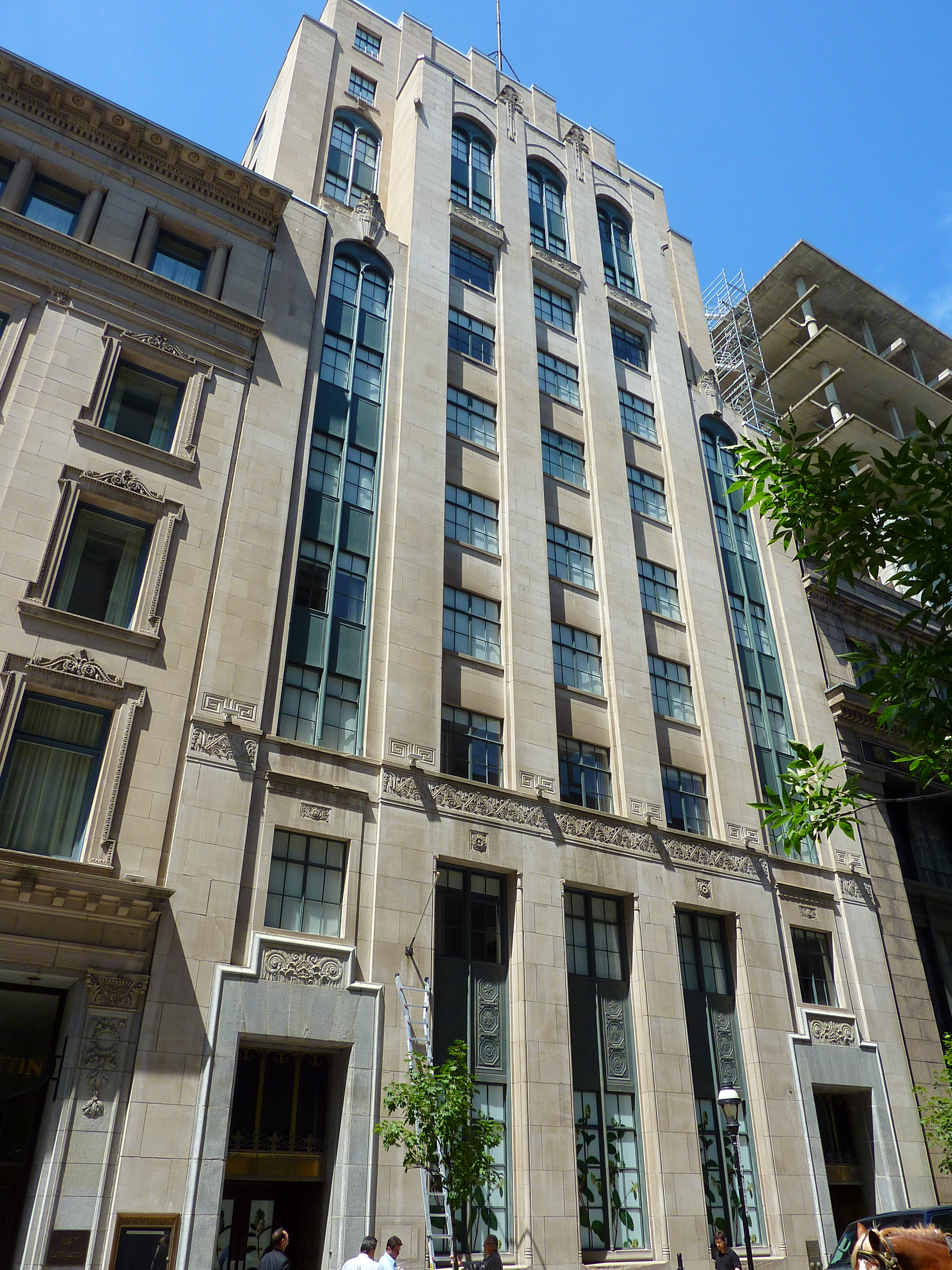
The second Montreal Star Building designed by Ross and Macdonald.

The Montreal Star Building is a former office complex, now hotel, in Montreal, Quebec, Canada. The complex, which is located in Old Montreal is composed of three different attached buildings belonging to the Montreal Star newspaper.

The complex was home to the Montreal Star and several of its sister publications until it ceased publication in 1979. From 1980 to 2003, the Montreal Gazette owned the building. The complex was renovated in 2008–2009 and is now part of the Westin Montreal hotel.

== Montreal Star I ==
The address of the original building is 241–245 Saint Jacques Street. The original Italianate Montreal Star building was designed by Montreal architect Alexander Francis Dunlop, with work starting in 1899 and completing in 1900. It is 5 stories tall.

== Montreal Star II ==
The address of the second building is 231–235 Saint Jacques Street and is an Art Deco structure. The second building was designed by Montreal architecture firm Ross and Macdonald. The building has 13 floors and is built with limestone from Indiana and grey granite around the doors.

The two basement levels and the foundations of the building were constructed in 1927 or 1928. Work on the above-ground floors began in 1929 and was completed in April 1930.
