= Molson Bank Building =

Building in Montreal

Coordinates: 45.50272°N 73.55903°W

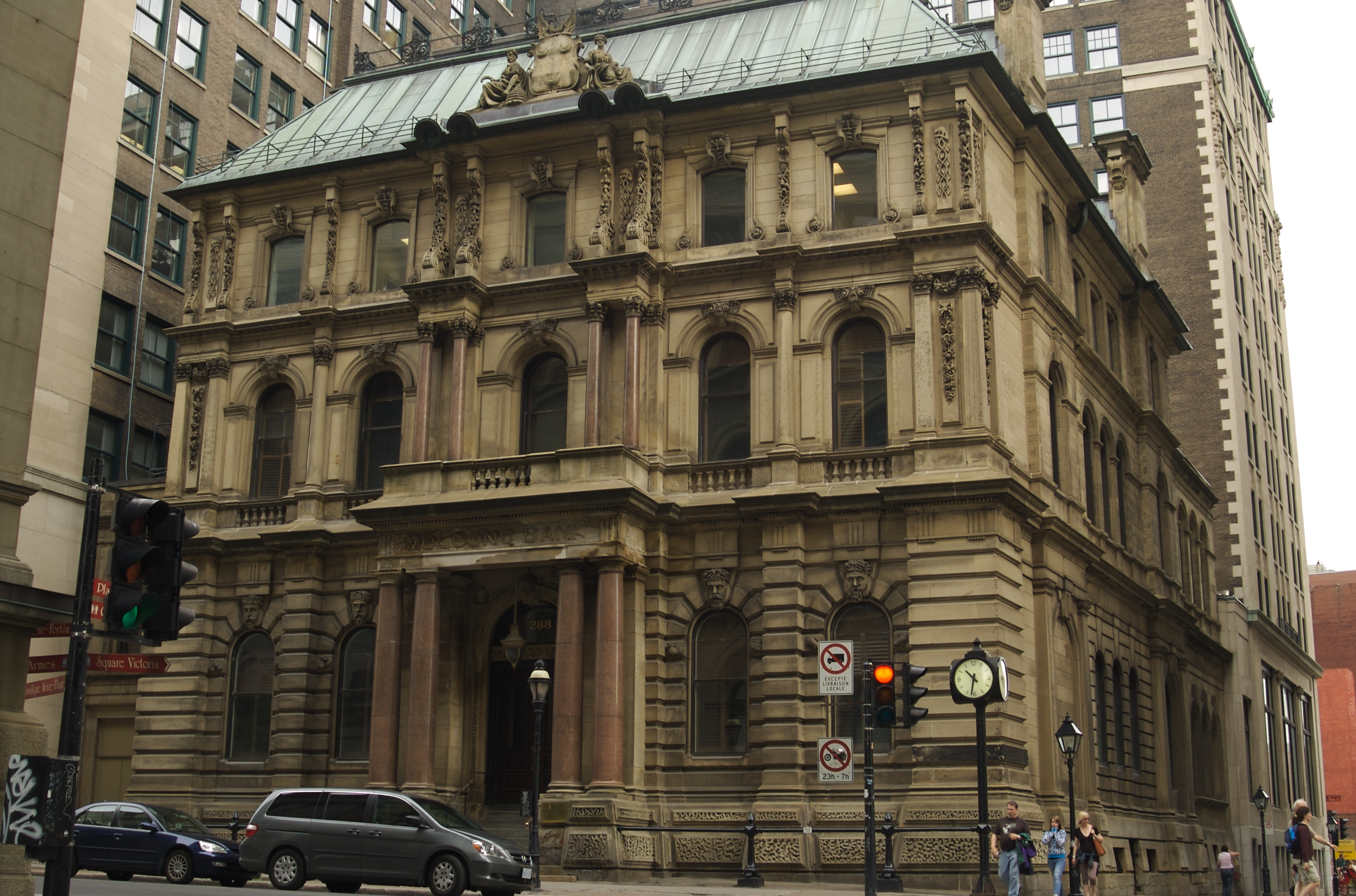
The Molson Bank building on Saint Jacques Street in Old Montreal.

The Molson Bank Building (French: Edifice de la Banque Molson) was built at the corner of St. Peter and St. James streets (now rue Saint-Pierre and rue Saint-Jacques) in the Old Montreal neighbourhood of Montreal, Quebec, as the headquarters of the Molson Bank in 1866 by order of founder William Molson (1793–1875). It was the first building in Montreal to be built in the Second Empire style, designed by George Browne working with his son John James George Browne.

Molson Bank merged with Bank of Montreal in 1925.

== History ==
The Molson Bank building was built between 1864 and 1866.

Since 1856, Molson Bank had had a building on St. James Street, which quickly became too small. Between the spring of 1863 and the spring of 1864, the company's directors bought the neighbouring lot to build a more spacious head office. An architectural competition was held and architects George and John James Browne won. Construction of the building, which required the demolition of other existing buildings, took nearly two years. The bank's counters and offices initially occupied the first floor and basement, while office space was created on the upper floors with a separate entrance on St. Peter Street. The first occupant of this area was a publisher, followed by various tenants.

Beginning in 1870, the bank opened branches, reinforcing the role of the head office on St. James Street, which also housed the main branch. By 1883, Molson Bank occupied the entire building. It had to enlarge the building in 1900 and 1911, which, at the end of the work, covered the entire surface of the lot. The Saint-Pierre Street entrance was replaced by an entrance on Saint-Jacques Street, where there had previously been a simple passage to a secondary door.

In 1925, the Bank of Montreal absorbed Molson Bank and its 125 branches. It therefore became the owner of the building, which now housed a branch and the company's international services. Unusually, the first floor was extended to Notre-Dame Street, within the Insurance Exchange building built behind the Molson Bank in 1923–1924. The Bank of Montreal closed its branch in 1981 and then began work on a bank training centre. In 1999, the Bank of Montreal disposed of the building and the following year the interior was renovated again. In 2009, the Molson Bank building was occupied by government and legal offices.

== See also ==
- Old Royal Bank Building, Montreal
- Tour CIBC
- Bank of Montreal Head Office, Montreal
- Old Canadian Bank of Commerce Building, Montreal

== Bibliography ==
- Rémillard, François, Old Montreal - A Walking Tour, Ministère des Affaires culturelles du Québec, 1992
