= Bank of Montreal Head Office =

Head office of Bank of Montreal in Canada

Bank of Montreal Head Office Édifice de la Banque de Montréal
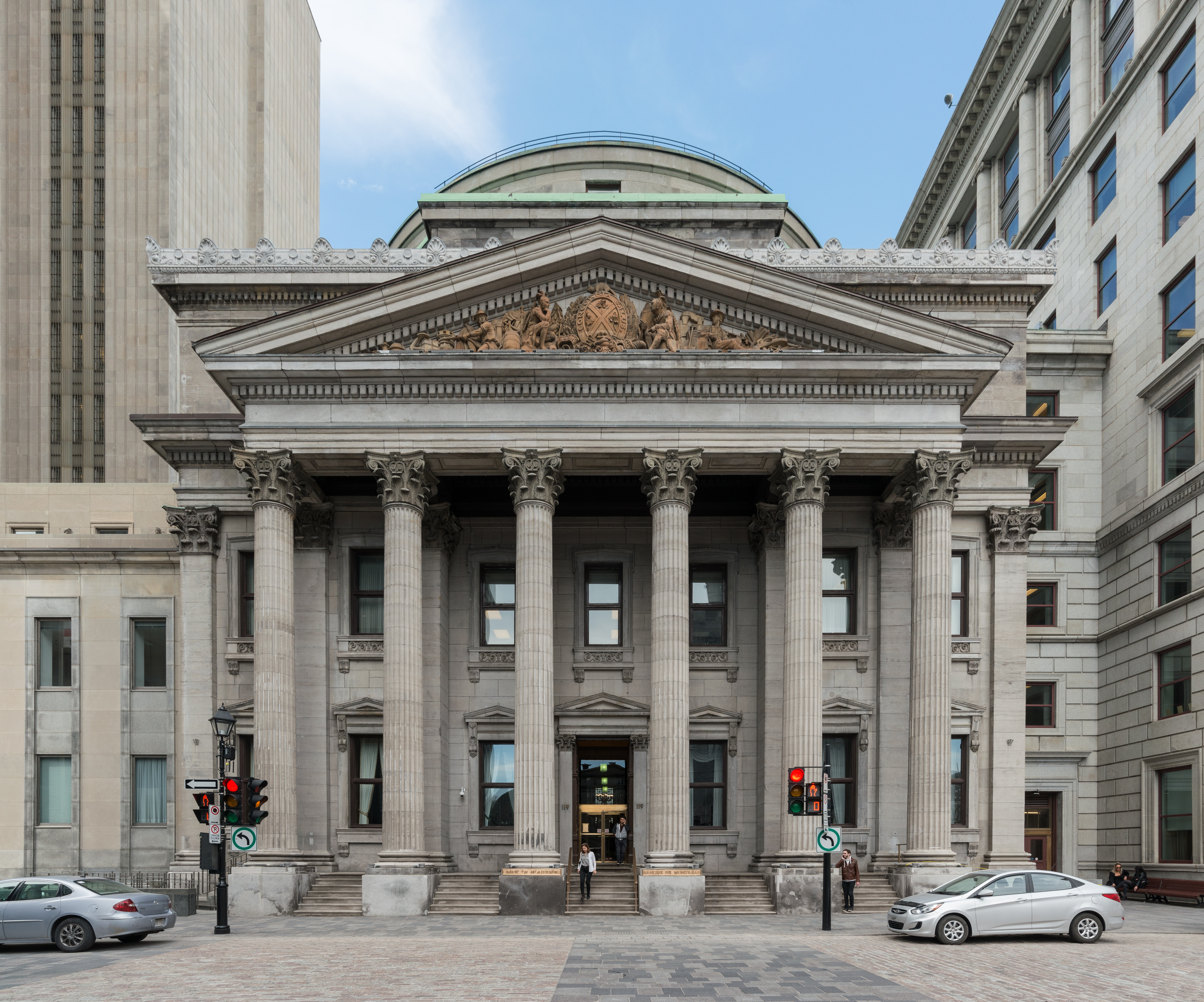
- Bank of Montreal's main Montreal branch at Place d'Armes in Old Montreal

General information
- Location: 119, rue Saint-Jacques; Montreal, Quebec; H2Y 1L6
- Coordinates: 45.5049°N 73.5579°W
- Current tenants: Bank of Montreal; Bank of Montreal Museum
- Completed: 1847

Technical details
- Floor count: 1

Design and construction
- Architect: John Wells
- Architecture firm: McKim, Mead & White
- Main contractor: Anglin-Norcross Ltd.

The Bank of Montreal's Head Office (French: Édifice de la Banque de Montréal) is located on 119, rue Saint Jacques (119, Saint Jacques Street) in Montreal, Quebec, Canada, across the Place d'Armes from the Notre-Dame Basilica in the Old Montreal neighbourhood. The Bank of Montreal is the oldest bank in Canada, founded in 1817. Although it still remains the bank's legal headquarters, its operational head office was moved to First Canadian Place in Toronto in 1977.

The centrepiece of the complex is the Bank of Montreal Main Branch, a Pantheon-like building designed by John Wells in 1847. The building was inspired by the design of the former headquarters of the Commercial Bank of Scotland in Edinburgh.

The building is in neoclassical style. The sculpted pediment of the building was done by Sir John Steell. The bronze pediment (23 tons, 16-meter wide) was melted in Scotland. Enlargements to the building were made in 1901–1905 by the New York City firm of McKim, Mead & White.

== Bank of Montreal Museum ==
The Bank of Montreal Museum features exhibits about the history of the bank, including a 19th-century teller's window, photos, coins and banknotes, cheques, and mechanical piggybanks. The displays are located in the passage between the old building and the current head office. The museum is open during regular bank hours and admission is free.

== Gallery ==
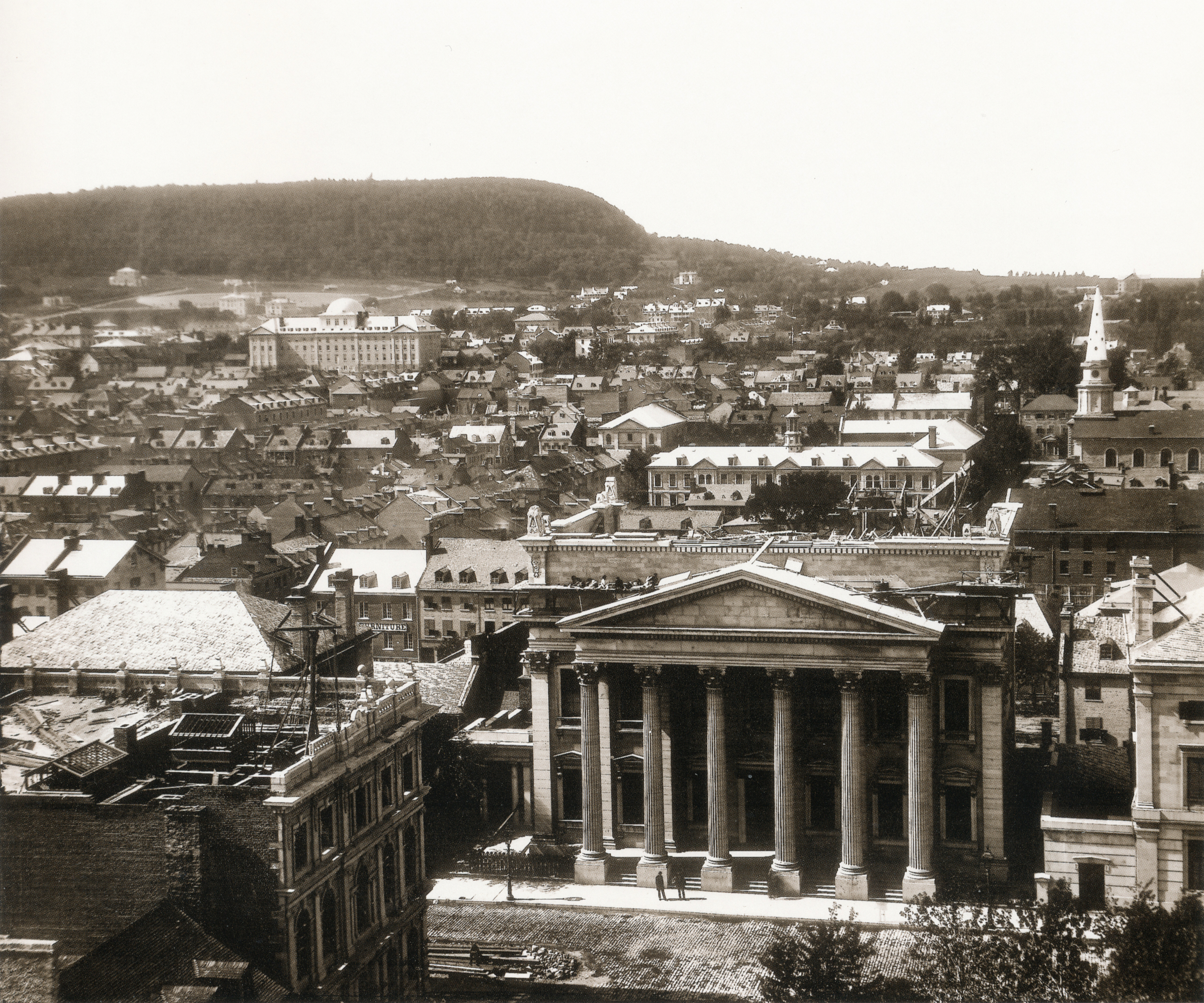
Bank of Montreal under construction (1859)

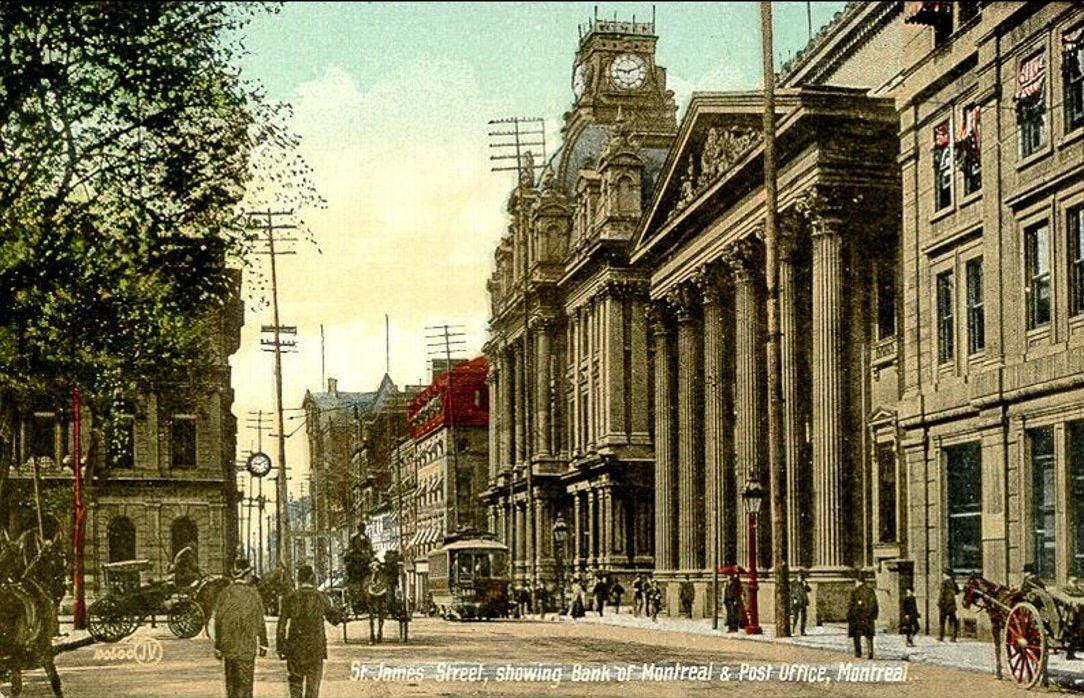
Bank of Montreal main Montreal branch ca. 1909

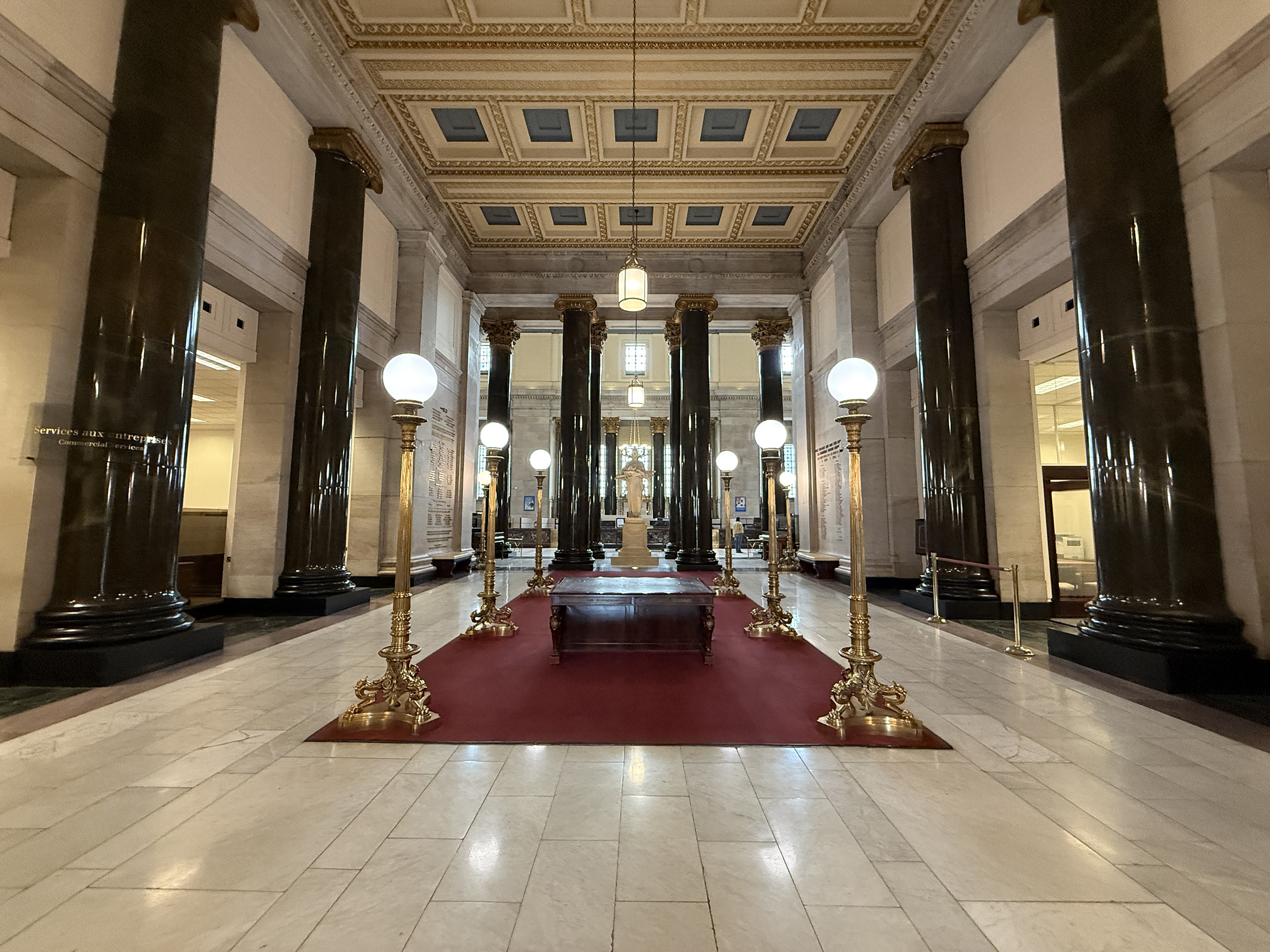
Bank of Montreal main Montreal branch

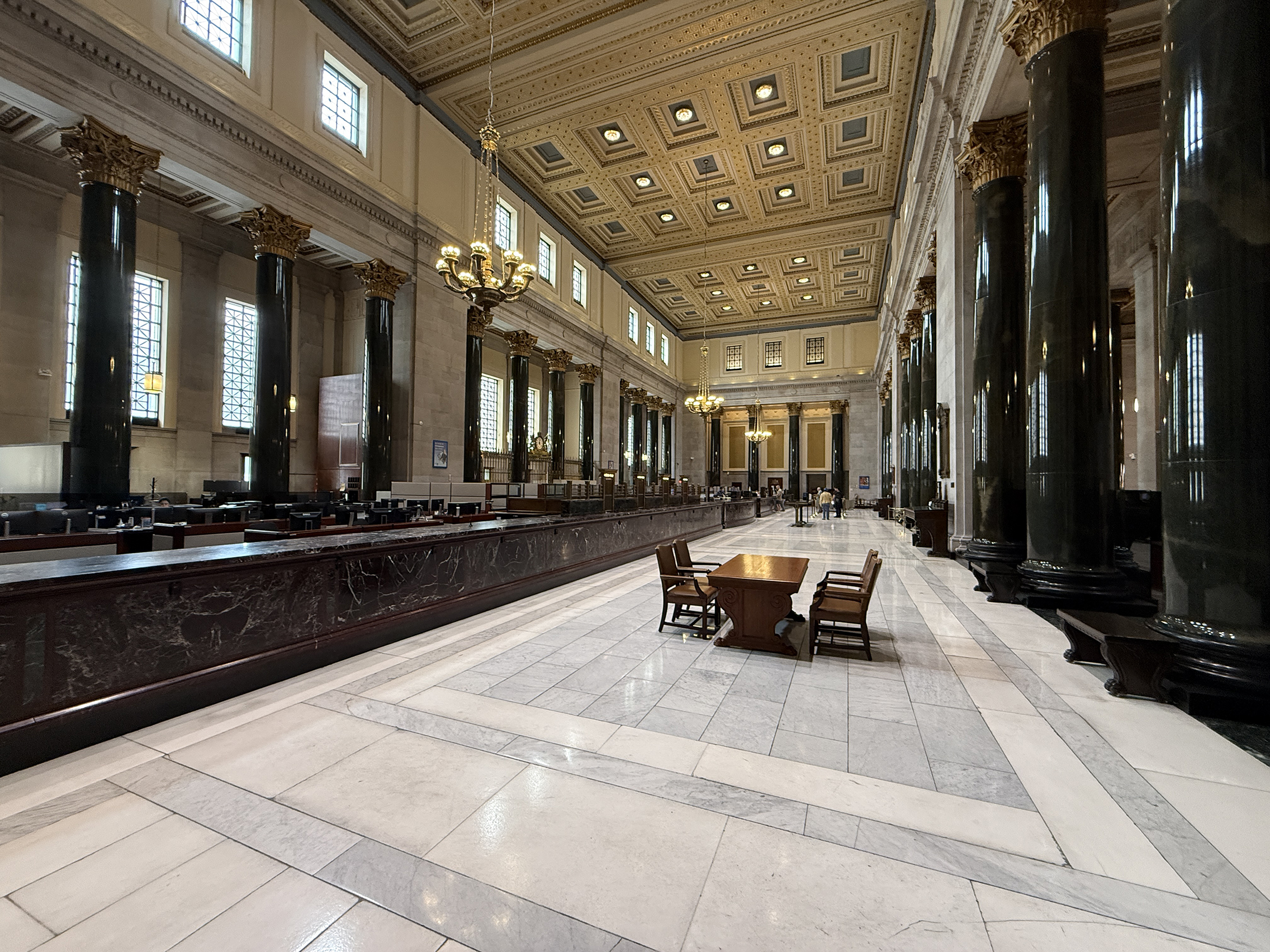
Bank of Montreal main Montreal branch interior

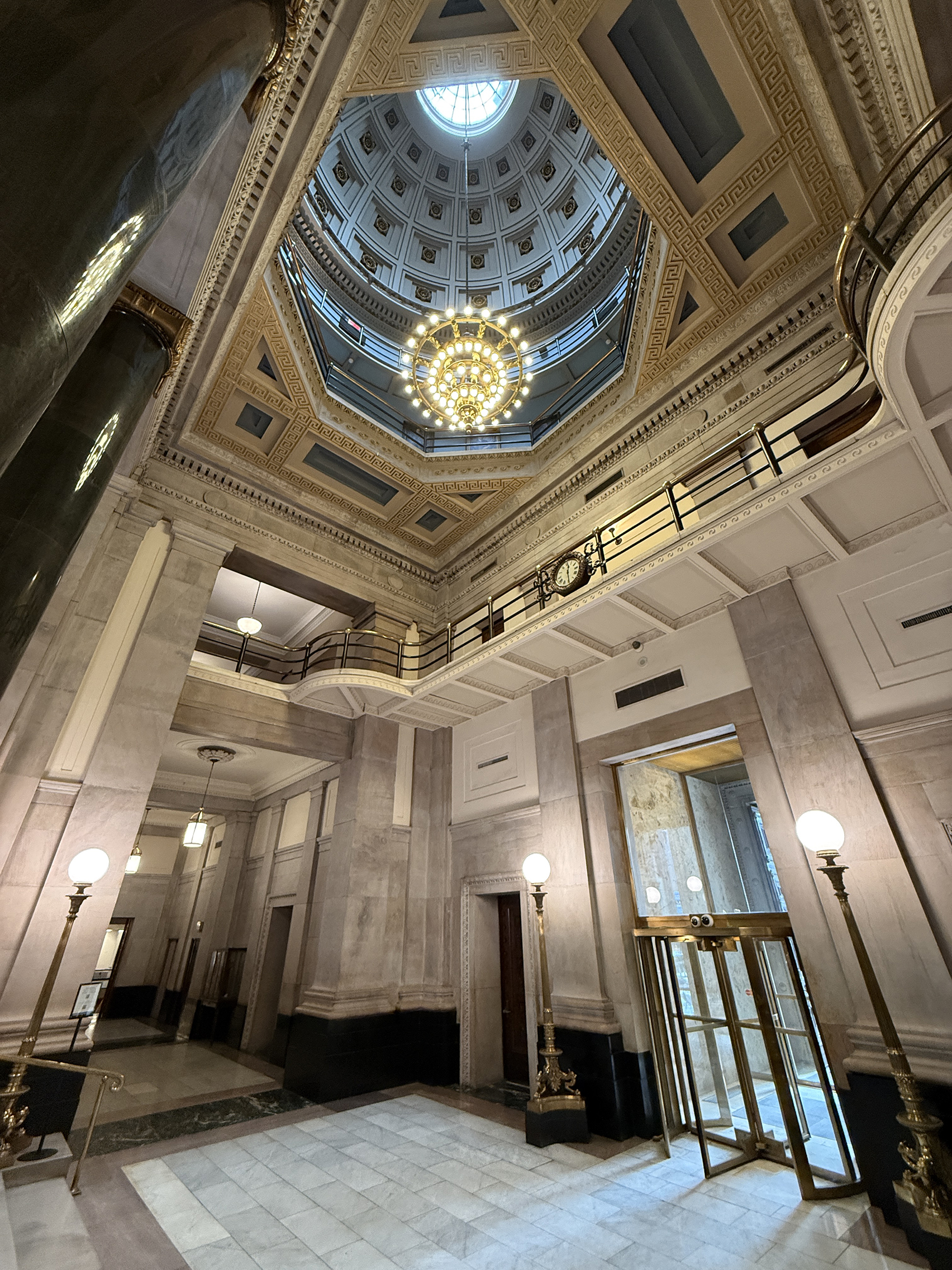
Bank of Montreal main Montreal branch foyer

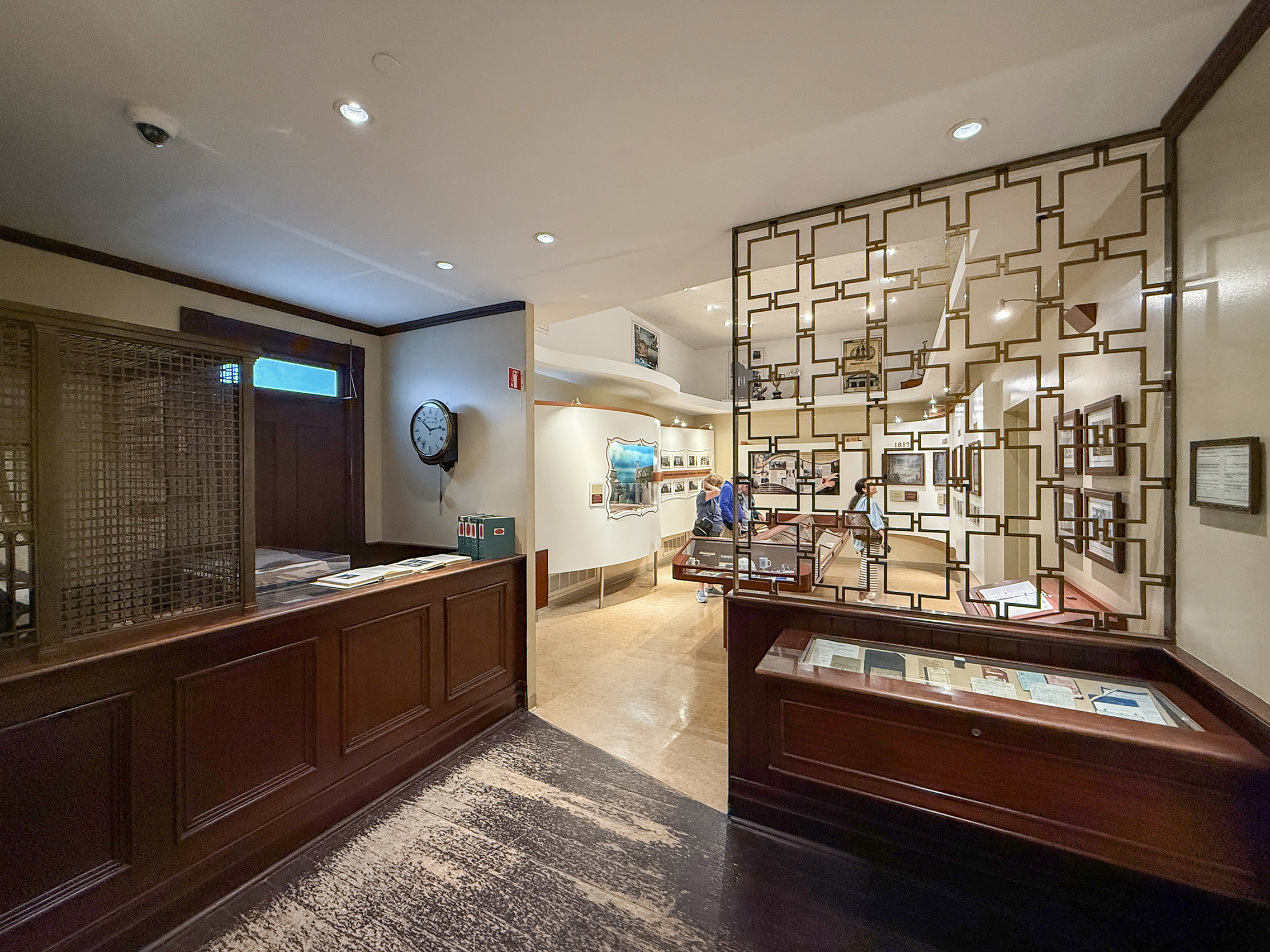
Bank of Montreal Museum

== See also ==
Other bank buildings in Montreal:

- Old Canadian Bank of Commerce Building, Montreal
- Old Royal Bank Building, Montreal
- Molson Bank Building, Montreal
- Tour CIBC

Other BMO buildings:

- First Canadian Place – operational head office of BMO in Toronto
