= Ottawa Hotel =

Hotel in Montreal, Quebec, Canada

Coordinates: 45°30′06″N 73°33′36″W

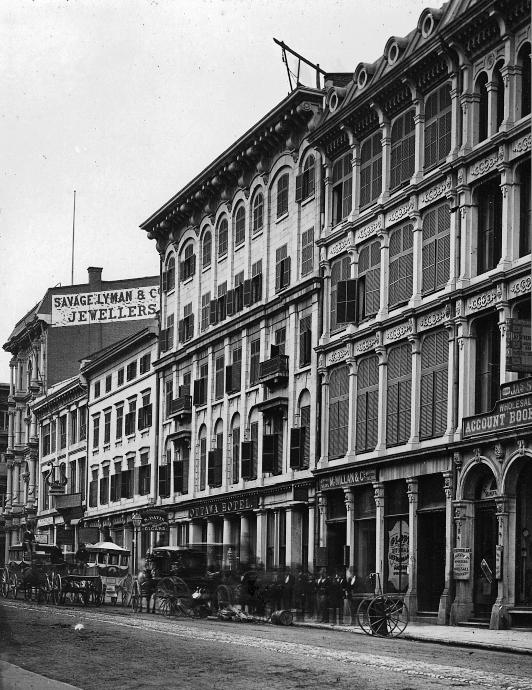
Ottawa Hotel, Montreal, 1874

The Ottawa Hotel in Montreal, Quebec, Canada, was built in 1845 at 50 Great St. James Street (currently 404-410 Saint Jacques Street) by George Hall. It is a 19th-century example of an attempt to build a skyscraper. Hall had previously owned a hotel by the same name located at the corner of McGill and St. Maurice Streets from at least 1842.

The Lovell's City Directories of 1844/45 through to 1850 lists the two Ottawa Hotels as: Ottawa Hotel (old,) (F.P. Levine,) McGill Street and Ottawa Hotel (new,) (George Hall,) 50 Great St. James Street.

The 1850 Lovell's listing also has an advertisement which states:

"Ottawa Hotel, by George Hall, No. 48 and 50, Great St. James Street, Montreal. This house is situated in one of the most Comfortable and Healthy Locality in Montreal, and is within two minutes walk of the POST OFFICE, BANKS, and principal CHURCHES in the City. The arrangements are such as to insure travellers the comfort of home, and the proprietor who has many years experience in the business, pledges himself that no exertion shall be wanting on his part to secure the convenience, health and enjoyment of those who may favor THE OTTAWA HOTEL with their presence."

The Lovell's Directories after 1852 list only the one Ottawa Hotel, on Great St. James Street. (Great St. James Street ran from Place d'Armes west to McGill Street, while Little St. James Street ran east from Place d'Armes to St. Gabriel Street) The 1852 Lovell's listing also has a full-page advertisement which states:

"The OTTAWA HOTEL, Great St. James Street, By S. Browning. The Subscriber begs to inform his friends and the public generally, that his house is open for the reception of travellers and borders. It stands in the very heart of the business part of the City, within two minutes walk of the Post Office and Banks. From the front is a delightful view of the Montreal Mountain, and on the South side a view of the Shipping in the Harbour, the New Market, the Steamers in the Canal Basin, and a delightful view of the Lachine Rapids with the Steamers descending them. The OTTAWA HOTEL has undergone a complete repair, and is thoroughly fitted up with entirely NEW FURNITURE of the most modern style, (from Messrs. Hilton's Manufactory,) regardless of cost. It will be found, the Subscriber flatters himself to be "just what it ought to be." The Subscriber has secured the services of Mr. F.V. Taft, formerly of the Delavan House, Albany, and late of the Phelps' House, Buffalo, a gentleman long and favourably known to the American travelling public - that is, to the people of the United States from Main to California, for who among them are not travellers! Mr. Taft's experience in the management of first-class hotels, cannot but conduce to the comfort of the patrons of The Ottawa. Carriages will be in attendance at the Railroad and Steamboat Depots, on the arrival of Cars and Boats. A large and commodious STABLE, within a few minutes' walk of the house has been secured, so that gentlemen wishing their horses kept, can be accommodated. CARRIAGES and HORSES, for parties of pleasure, may be obtained at all times. S. Browning. Montreal, July, 1852."

About 1855, Samuel Browning added a new wing containing 30 "spacious and well ventilated bedrooms" on the parcel behind the hotel, on what is now Notre-Dame Street West.

Different ads run in the Lovell's Directories between 1855/56 and 1857/58 also add that:

"The PARLORS and BEDROOMS are light, airy, and well ventilated; the TABLE is always supplied with the best to be found in the markets; and the WINES, LIQUORS and CIGARS are invariably of the Choicest Brands."

The Ottawa Hotel continued in operation until about 1881/82, after which it was converted into stores and offices. For example, the Euard & MacDonald Hardware occupied space in the Ottawa Hotel from 1882/83.

The neo-classical hotel is still home to offices and stores today and is protected with heritage status.

== See also ==
- Old Montreal
