= Alexander Francis Dunlop =

Canadian architect (1842–1923)

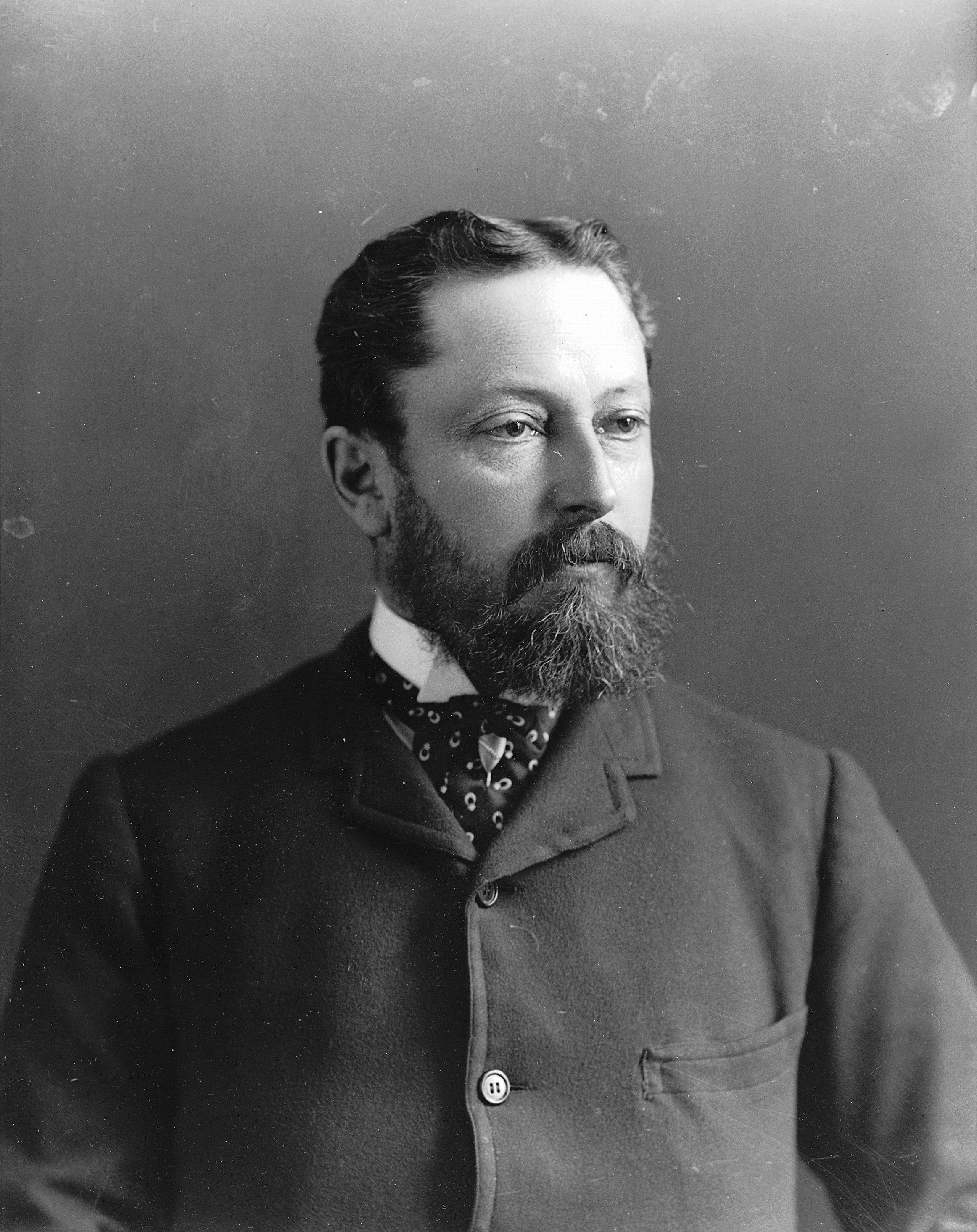
- Alexander Francis Dunlop
- Born: August 4, 1842; Montreal, Quebec, Canada
- Died: April 30, 1923 (aged 80)
- Occupation: Architect
- Practice: George Browne and John James Browne.
- Buildings: Saint James United Church

Alexander Francis Dunlop (August 4, 1842 – April 30, 1923), was a Canadian architect from Montreal, Quebec.

== Biography ==
Dunlop worked as an apprentice to Montreal architects George Browne and John James Browne. From 1871 to 1874 he lived and worked in Detroit, Michigan. He opened his own architectural firm in Montreal in 1874. The firm operated until his death in 1923. He became the president of the Association of Architects of the Province of Quebec in 1890 and in 1907 became the first president of the Royal Architectural Institute of Canada. He was a member of the Royal Canadian Academy of Arts.

Dunlop gained notability for the realization of the Saint James United Church on Saint Catherine Street in Montreal, which took place from 1887 to 1889. He designed major alterations to the East Wing of McGill College (now called the Arts Building, McGill University) for Prof. Bovey and the Science Dept., 1888. Afterward he designed numerous prestigious commercial buildings and residences in the Golden Square Mile. He designed the first Montreal Star Building.

Various promising Montreal architects learned their trade working with Dunlop, including Edward Maxwell, Robert Findlay, David Robertson Brown and Georges-Alphonse Monette.

He was a member of the organizing committee of the Province of Quebec Association of Architects and a founding member and first president of the Royal Architecture Institute of Canada from 1907 to 1910. The A.F. Dunlop Scholarships in the McGill School of Architecture were created in his memory.

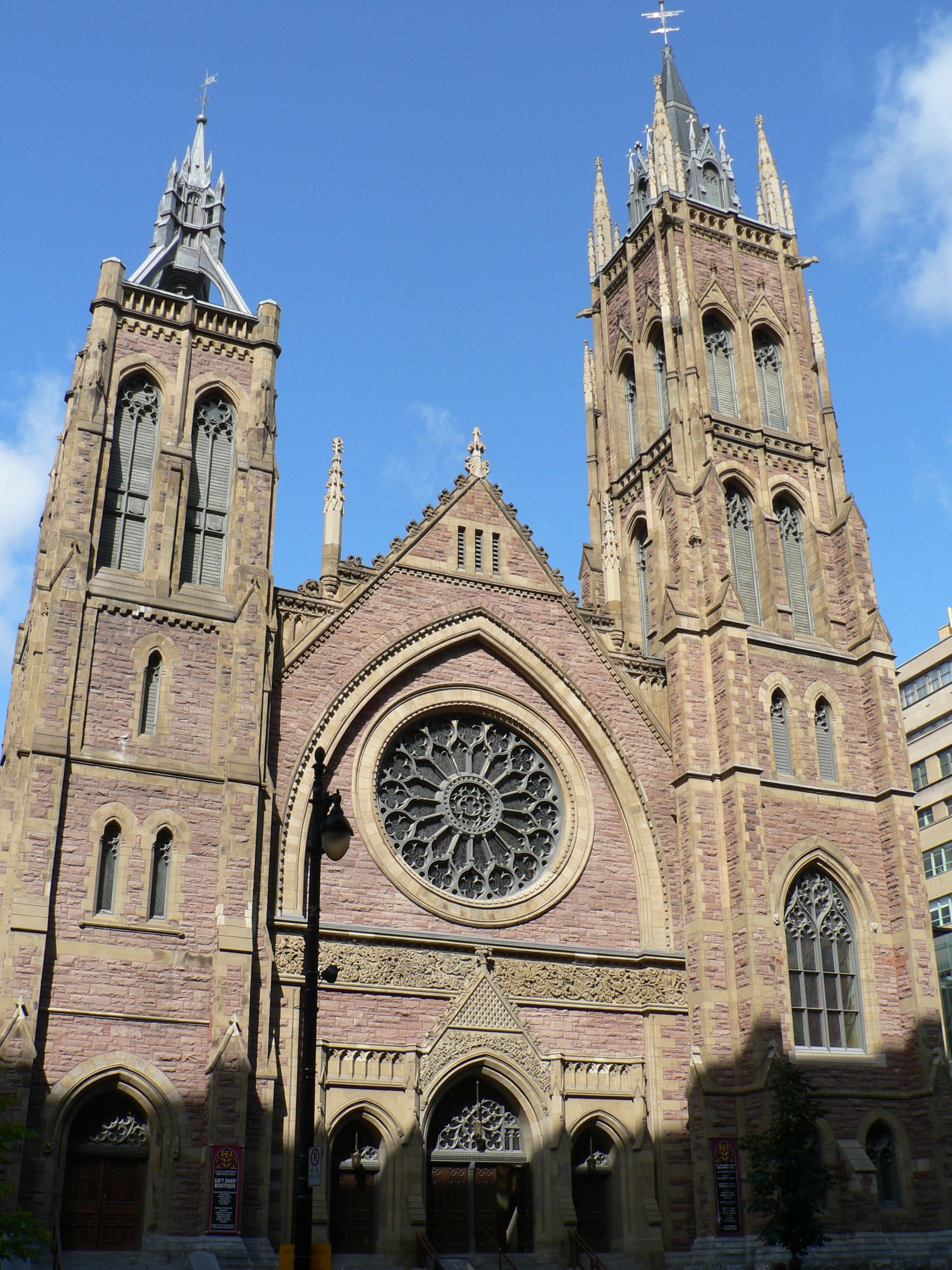
St. James United Church

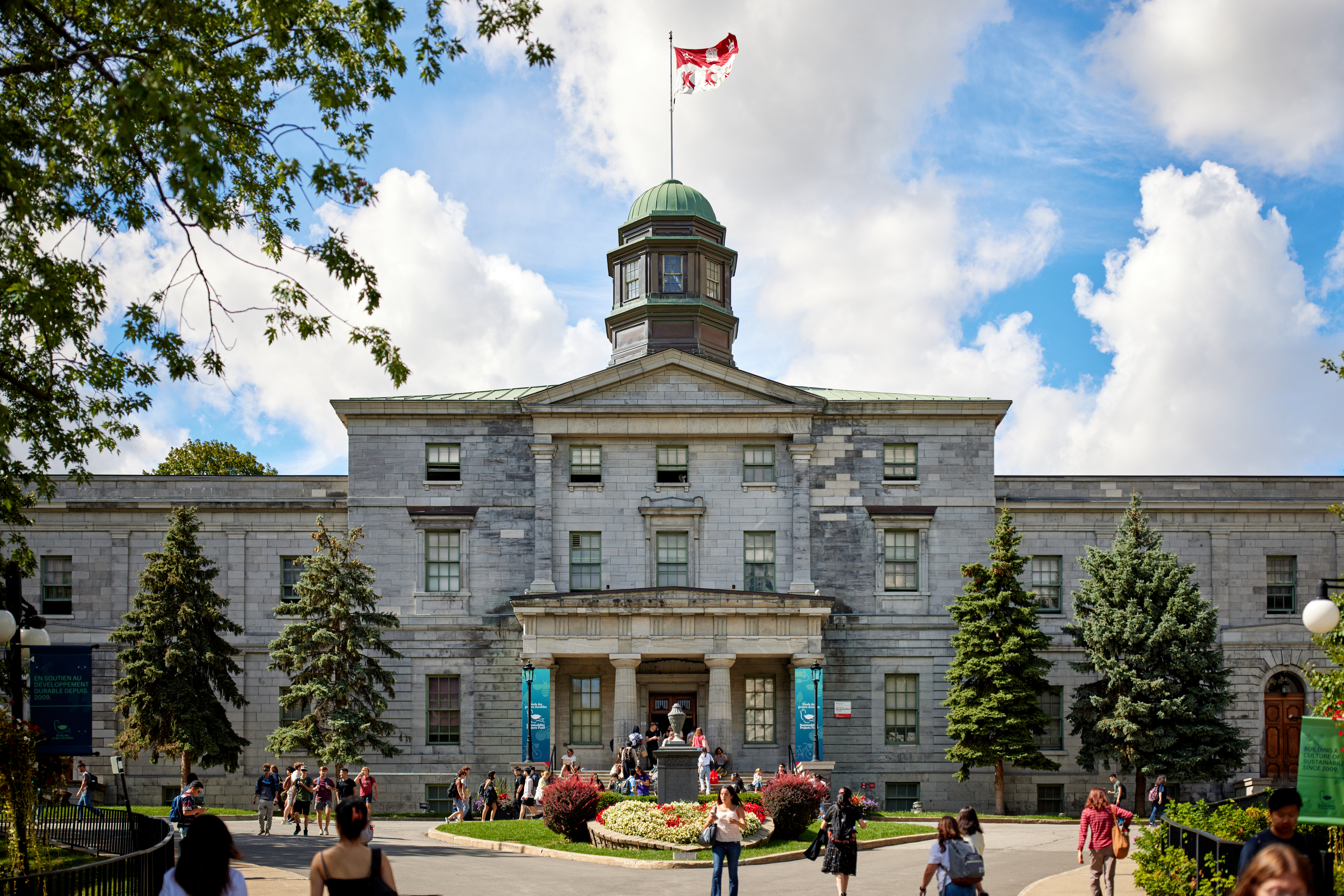
McGill University Arts Building
