= Richard A. Waite =

American architect (1848–1911)

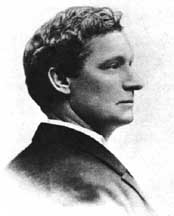
- Born: Richard Alfred Waite; May 14, 1848; London, UK
- Died: January 7, 1911 (aged 62); New York City, New York USA
- Occupation: Architect
- Spouse: Sarah Holloway
- Parent(s): Charles Henry Waite; Harriet Humphries Holland
- Practice: Buffalo, New York
- Buildings: Ontario Legislative Building, Toronto

Richard Alfred Waite (May 14, 1848 – January 7, 1911) was a British-born American architect in the late 19th century.

== Early years ==
Richard Waite was born in London in 1848 as one of seven children (surviving included William T., Helen and Jennie) of Charles Henry Waite and his wife Harriet Humphries Holland. Richard Waite's father moved to America in 1856 with his wife and children and settled in Buffalo, New York, to work in a printing company.

== Education and career ==
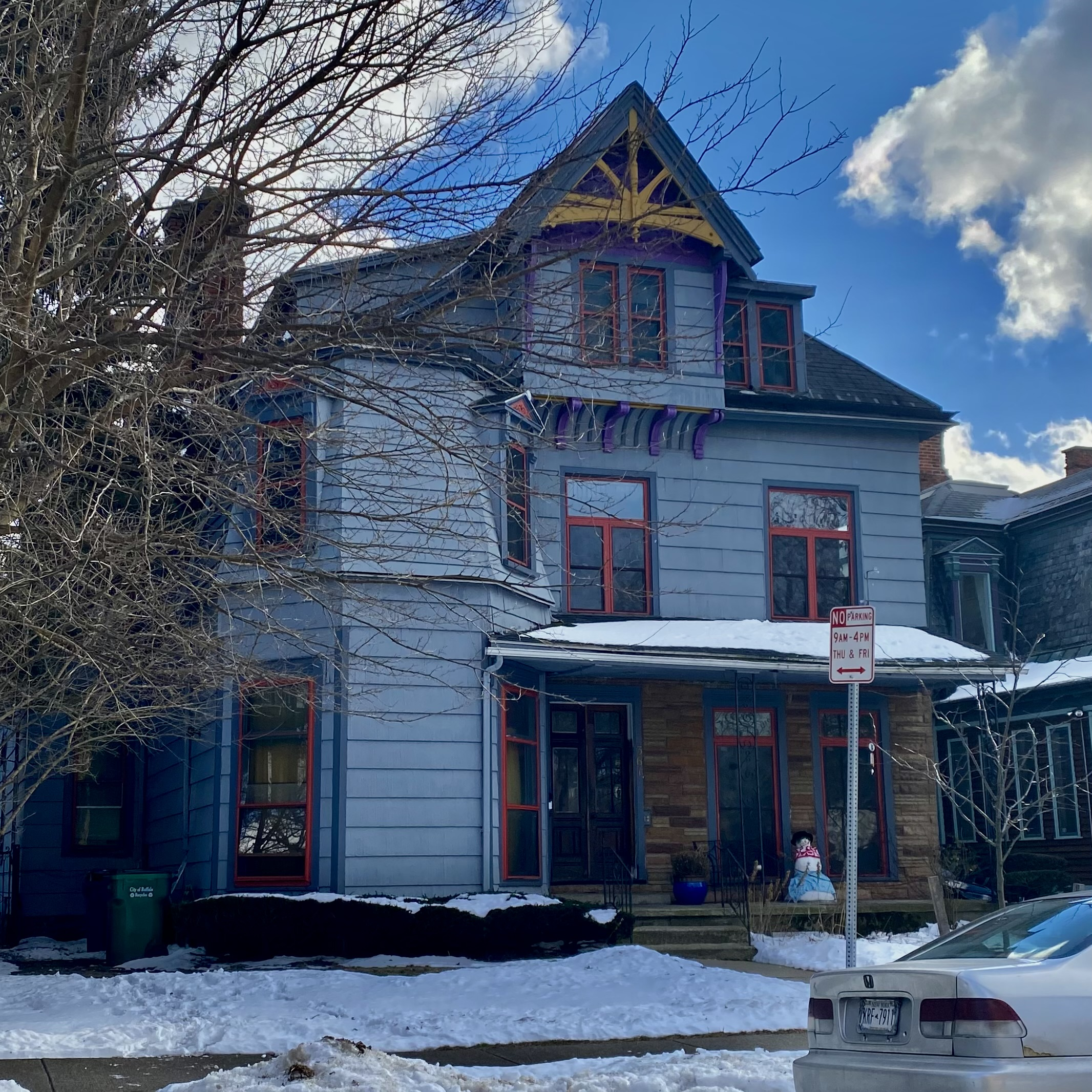
The house on Pennsylvania Street in Buffalo, New York, in which Waite lived for the majority of his career.

Waite like many early architects, learned building design as an apprentice. He studied mechanical engineering in New York City under John Ericsson, the inventor of the Civil War ironclad USS Monitor.

Waite returned to Buffalo in 1874 as a fully trained architect. His 1869 marriage to Sarah Holloway, daughter of local contractor Isaac Holloway, afforded him several public works commissions. In 1876, he made architectural history by hiring Louise Blanchard Bethune as a draftsman. She went on to become the first professional woman architect in the United States.

== Projects ==
Although Waite designed many homes in the Buffalo area, some of his best-known commissions were in Canada.

Some of Waite's key accomplishments:

=== Buffalo, New York ===
- The Werner Photography Building (101–103 Genesee Street) 1895
- Trinity Episcopal Church (Delaware Avenue and Johnson Park) 1872 (plans only as Trinity Episcopal Church was built by another architect in the 1880s)
- Public School 32 (32 South Cedar Street), built late 1870s; later demolished and replaced. The replacement structure is now used by Bennett Park Montessori School.
- Pierce's Palace Hotel, built 1878 (Beaux-Arts architecture/Classical Revival architecture) – located on Porter Avenue and burned down in 1881, it is now the site of D'Youville College campus at Prospect Park.
- Walden-Myer Mausoleum, Forest Lawn Cemetery, Buffalo, built 1885 (Romanesque Revival)
- Buffalo German Insurance Company Building, built 1875 – (Second Empire architecture) office building located at Main and Lafayette Square; demolished ca. 1957 and now site of Tishman Building
- W.H. Glenny & Sons Building (257 Main Street), built 1875 (Italian Renaissance Revival/Palazzo architecture); rebuilt 1905 after fire; now named Dennis Building
- George Williams House (249 North Street), built 1877 (Stick style), interior was renovated in 1909 in Colonial Revival style.
- Buffalo Music Hall, (760–768 Main Street at Edward Street), built 1885–1887 (Richardson Romanesque). Later known as the Teck Theater; demolished 1980s–1990s.
- Phillip Becker Mansion (534 Delaware Avenue), built 1887–1888 – built for Mayor Phillip Becker; later converted into the Plaza Suites executive offices
- White Brothers Livery Stable (428–430 Jersey Street), built 1889 (Commercial Romanesque Revival)
- Richard A. Waite House (361 Pennsylvania Street)
- Private residence (357 Pennsylvania Street)
- Private residence (355 Pennsylvania Street)

=== South Bend, Indiana ===
- Waite helped design the Oliver Opera House on Main Street North and West Washington Street. This opera house was built in 1885 for James and Joseph Doty Oliver, both founders of the Oliver Chilled Plow Works located in South Bend, Indiana. James Oliver was the inventor of the Chilled Plow. The opera house was demolished after it closed in 1953, and the space is presently used for parking adjacent to the JMS Building.

=== Hamilton, Ontario ===
- Headquarters of the Bank of Hamilton
- Canada Life Building, built 1883 - (Richardsonian Romanesque) Built at the corner of King Street East and Hughson Street South for Canada Life Insurance as their Head Office (until 1900 when it was relocated to Toronto) and sold to jeweller Henry Birks and Sons in 1929. Birks ground floor retail store closed and building was demolished in 1972. Part of the site was replaced by Fidelity-Equitable Trust Tower (now HSBC Tower) in 1974; the remaining space was incorporated into Gore Park.
  - Birks "Clock of the Charging Horsemen" was restored and placed inside of Farmers Market (York Boulevard and MacNab Street North) from 1986 to 2007. It was removed, then remounted outdoors in Jackson Square (corner of James Street North and King Street West) in 2010.

=== Montreal, Quebec ===
- Canada Life Assurance Company Building, built 1898 (Romanesque Revival architecture). After being used as an office building for several decades, it was converted for residential use as St. Regis condos.
- Grand Trunk Railway Company Limited Building, built 1906 (Italianate architecture) - (360 rue McGill). It is now known as Édifice Gérald-Godin.
- Maison James-Reid-Wilson
- Standard Life Building, 235 St James Street, built 1883, burned down 1922.

=== Toronto ===
- Ontario Legislative Building, built 1892 (Richardsonian Romanesque); home of Ontario Legislature since 1892.
- Headquarters of the Western Assurance Company Wellington Street East at Scott 1878-1880; demolished.
- Headquarters of the Canadian Bank of Commerce at Melinda and Jordan Streets 1890; demolished 1928 for the bank’s new building and now Commerce Court North.
- Canada Life Building on King Street near Bay Street 1887-1888; demolished 1940.
- Mail Building 1870s; demolished 1939 for Bank of Montreal Building.
- Curio museum, later Bijou Theatre at 91-93 Yonge Street 1890; destroyed by fire 1905

== Personal and death ==
Waite's mother died in 1862 and his wife Sarah in 1901. Waite died in 1911, survived by brother William T (also an architect), and by his five children:

- Helen Holloway Waite (November 16, 1871 – December 6, 1949)
- Son Richard Alfred Waite II (January 30, 1874 – March 11, 1961) studied architecture at Cornell University, but changed to theology at Syracuse University due to poor health. He became a Methodist minister and died in St. Louis, Missouri. Waite is buried with his wife at Forest Lawn Cemetery in Buffalo.
- Raymond Isaac Waite, (October 18, 1875 – December 28, 1945)
- Evadne Holland Waite (October 1, 1879 – June 4, 1922)
- Mary Sarah Waite (December 26, 1880 – March 3, 1956)
