= George Browne (architect) =

Irish-Canadian architect (1811 – 1885)

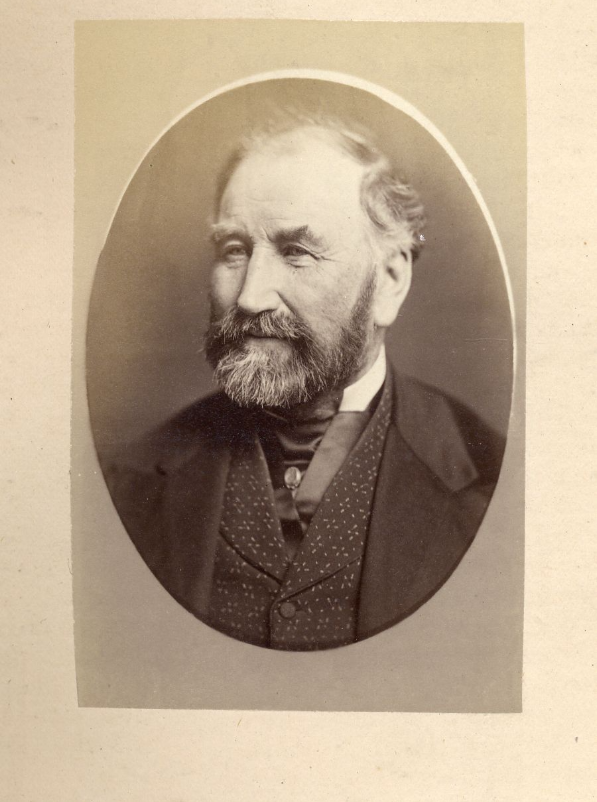
George Browne (architect)

George Browne (November 5, 1811 – November 19, 1885) was an Irish-born Canadian architect who designed some of the finest buildings in Canada of his time.

He was born in Belfast and was said to be the son of an Irish architect who was also named George Browne. Browne designed houses in Quebec City and Montreal during the 1830s. He designed buildings in Kingston after it became the capital of the Canadas in 1841 and then moved to Montreal after the capital was moved there.

He was married twice, first to Anna Maria Jameson and then to Helen Kissock. He served on Montreal city council and as a commissioner of the peace.

Browne died in Montreal at the age of 74 and was buried in Mount Royal Cemetery under a monument which he had designed for his first wife.

His son George was a prominent architect active in Winnipeg and his son John James was also an architect active in Montreal.

Buildings designed by Browne which are still in use include Kingston City Hall, a former Bank of Montreal building in Kingston and the Molsons Bank at Montreal (now the Bank of Montreal). His villa Terra Nova (1848) in Côte-des-Neiges, built for John Molson Jr. and later the home of Sir Charles Gordon, survives as a pavilion of Saint Joseph's Oratory.
