= Victoria sur le Parc =

Mixed-use skyscraper in Montreal, Quebec, Canada

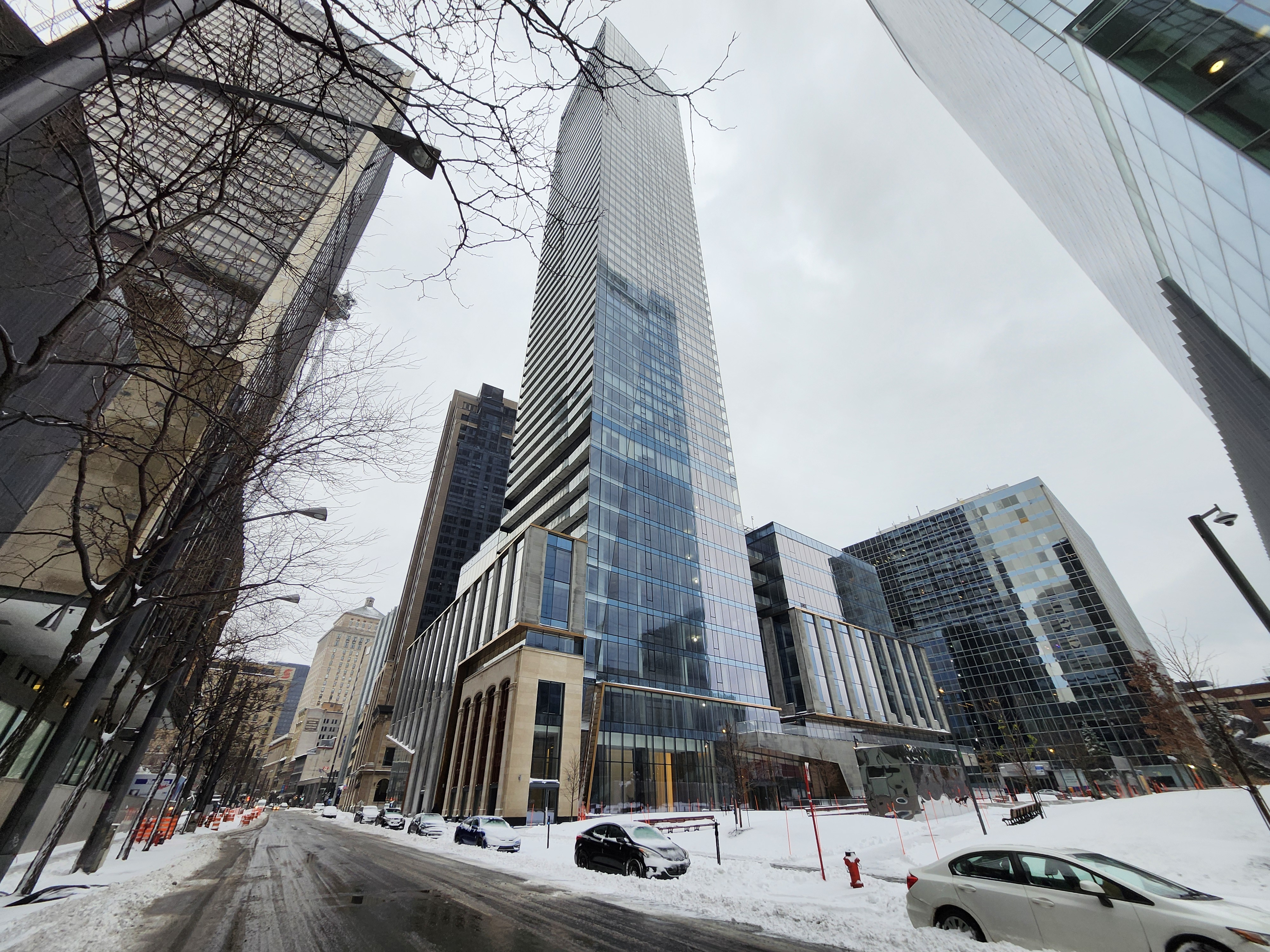
- Victoria sur le Parc (center) from street-level in 2024
- Interactive map of the Victoria sur le Parc area

General information
- Status: Completed
- Type: Mixed-use
- Architectural style: Modern
- Location: 700 Rue Saint-Jacques; Montreal, Quebec; H3C 1E9
- Coordinates: 45°30′00″N 73°33′39″W
- Construction started: April 30, 2019
- Completed: 2023
- Opened: 2025

Height
- Architectural: 200 m (660 ft)

Technical details
- Floor count: 58

Design and construction
- Architecture firm: Beique Legault Thuot Architectes; IBI Group Architects
- Developer: Broccolini
- Main contractor: Broccolini

Other information
- Number of units: 400

Website
- victoriasurleparc.com

Victoria sur le Parc is a mixed-use skyscraper in Montreal, Quebec, Canada. It is named for its location just south of Victoria Square in the city's downtown core.

When completed in 2023, Victoria sur le Parc became the tallest residential building in Montreal, and tied with the then completed 800 Saint-Jacques Street West as the third tallest building in Montreal.

== Location ==
Victoria sur le Parc is located at the corner of Boulevard Robert-Bourassa and Rue Saint-Jacques in the northwest corner of the Cité du Multimédia neighbourhood of Montreal. The building is located within 300 metres of Victoria Square, Place Bonaventure, Gare Centrale, and the eastbound entrances to the underground portion of Autoroute 720.

== History ==
In January 2018, a 12,541 square metre (135,000 sq ft) site beside the Tour de la Bourse was purchased by real estate developer Broccolini for $100 million, a large portion of which was subsequently sold to National Bank for the development of their new headquarters. The site was formerly occupied by a few low-rise buildings and a parking lot.

Construction of Victoria sur le Parc began on 30 April 2019 but was temporarily halted in March 2020 due to public health concerns brought on by the COVID-19 pandemic. Construction resumed on May 11 and the building is still expected to be completed by 2023.

=== Design ===
Victoria sur le Parc will feature a glass-clad exterior and a prominent diamond-shaped roof that slopes down toward the St. Lawrence River, similar to the roof of the Crain Communications Building in Chicago. The building structure is composed of two distinct elements: a 9-storey podium featuring 30,658 square metres of mixed commercial and office space, and a 49-storey residential tower featuring 400 housing units of varying sizes.

== See also ==
- List of tallest buildings in Quebec
- List of tallest buildings in Montreal
