= List of tallest buildings in Quebec =

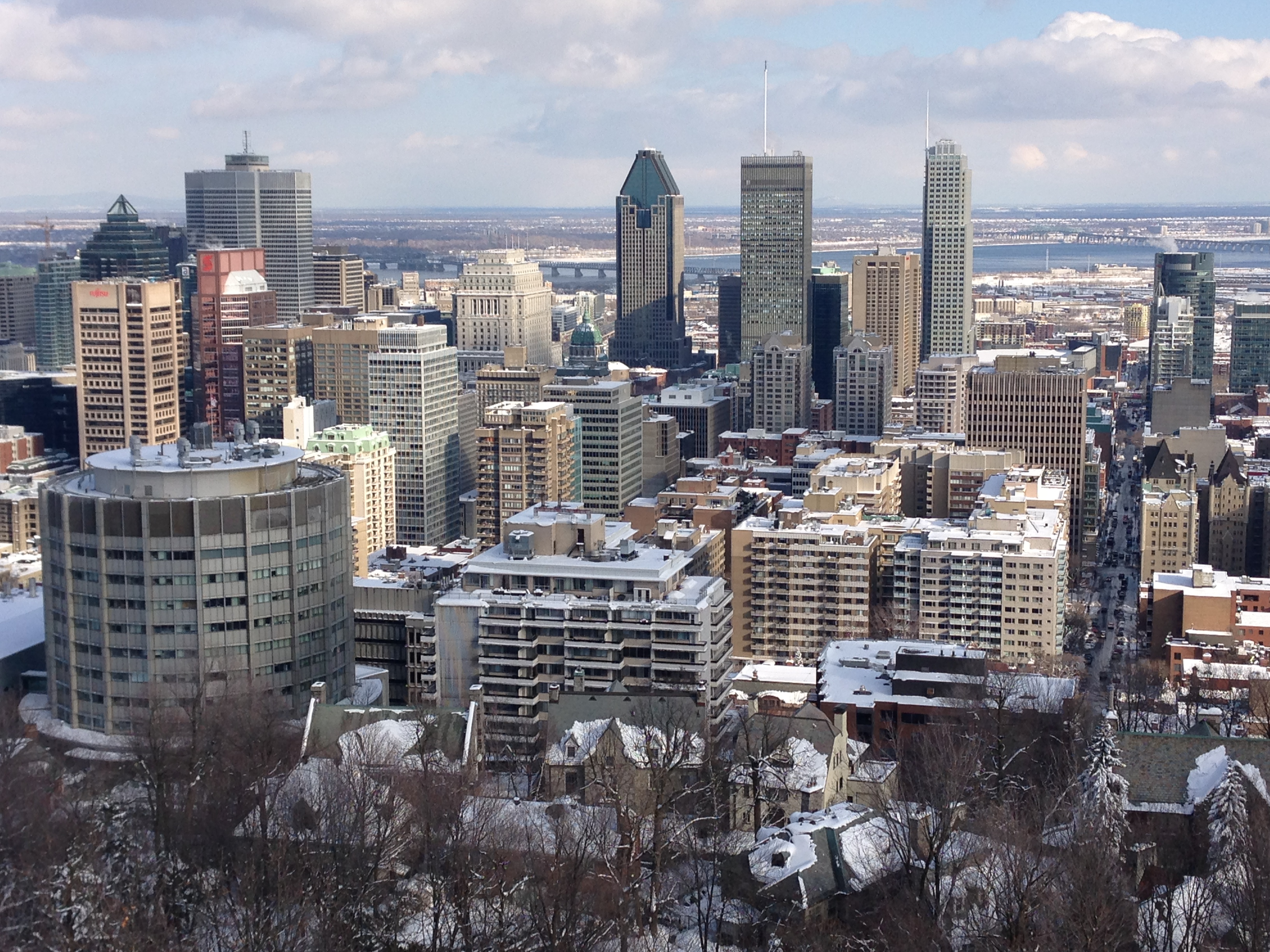
Downtown Montreal from Mount Royal in March 2013, before the 2015-2021 construction boom era.

This is a list of the tallest buildings in Quebec that ranks skyscrapers and high-rise buildings in the province of Quebec, Canada, by height. Buildings in five cities are included in this list; Montreal, Quebec City, Gatineau, Longueuil, and Westmount, each having buildings taller than 100 meters. The tallest building by roof height in the province is the 51-storey, 205-metre-tall (673 ft), 1000 de La Gauchetière. However, for international comparisons, spires are included as per the Council on Tall Buildings and Urban Habitat's most widely used height definition for building height and thus the tallest building according to this definition is the 1250 René-Lévesque at 226.5m (199m without its spire).

Municipal regulations forbid any building from exceeding the smallest of the following two conditions: the height of Mount Royal, or 232,5 m (764 ft) above mean sea level or 200m of building height. Above-ground height is further limited in most areas and a minority of the downtown land plots are allowed to contain buildings exceeding 120 metres in height. The maximum limit is currently attained by 1000 de La Gauchetière and 1250 René-Lévesque, the latter of which is shorter, but built on higher ground.

By contrast, Gatineau and Quebec City do not have building height restrictions.

== Tallest buildings ==
This list ranks buildings in Quebec that stand at least 100 m (328 ft) tall, based on CTBUH height measurement standards. This includes spires and architectural details but does not include antenna masts. An equal sign (=) following a rank indicates the same height between two or more buildings. Freestanding observation and/or telecommunication towers, while not habitable buildings, are included for comparison purposes; however, they are not ranked. One such tower is the Tour de Montréal.

Rank	Name	Image	Location	Height m (ft)	Floors	Year	Notes	Ref
1	1250 René-Lévesque	1250 René-Lévesque	Montreal	226.5 (743)	47	1992	Originally known as the IBM-Marathon Tower. Roof height is 199m	
2	1000 de La Gauchetière	1000 de La Gauchetière	Montreal	205 (673)	51	1992	This is the tallest building in Montreal by roof height. It reaches the maximum roof height allowed by the city	
3	Tour de la Bourse	Tour de la Bourse	Montreal	194 (637)	47	1964	The tallest building in Canada until completion of the Toronto-Dominion Bank Tower in Toronto. The tallest reinforced concrete building in the world until the completion of Lake Point Tower in Chicago. The tallest building constructed in Montreal in the 1960s.	
4	Place Ville-Marie	Place Ville-Marie	Montreal	188 (617)	47	1962	The tallest building in Canada until completion of the Tour de la Bourse.	
5	CIBC Tower	CIBC Tower	Montreal	187 (614)	45	1962	The tallest building in Canada and the whole British Commonwealth when completed in 1962. Surpassed within a year by Place Ville-Marie.	
6	L'Avenue	L/Avenue	Montreal	184.4 (605)	50	2017	The tallest residential tower in Montreal, and the tallest residential tower in Canada east of Toronto. It contains 304 condominium apartments, along with an important mixed use component; a Provigo branded grocery store, four office floors, and ground floor retail.	
N/A	Tour de Montréal	Tour de Montréal	Montreal	175 (574)	20	1987	The Tour de Montréal is the tallest inclined tower in the world. (Note: The Tour de Montréal is not a habitable building, but is included in this list for comparative purposes. Per a ruling by the Council on Tall Buildings and Urban Habitat, freestanding observation towers are not considered to be buildings, as they are not fully habitable structures.)	
7	Tour des Canadiens	Tour des Canadiens	Montreal	167 (548)	50	2016		
8	Tour des Canadiens 2	Tour des Canadiens 2	Montreal	168 (551)	53	2019		
9	1501 McGill College	1501 McGill College	Montreal	158 (519)	36	1992		
10	Complexe Desjardins South Tower	Complexe Desjardins South	Montreal	152 (499)	40	1976	The tallest building constructed in Montreal in the 1970s.	
11=	Roccabella (East Tower)	Roccabella Drummond	Montreal	147 (482)	40	2016	Roccabella east and west towers are the tallest twin towers in Montreal.	
11=	Roccabella (West Tower)	Roccabella De la Montagne	Montreal	147 (482)	40	2018	Topped out. Roccabella east and west towers are the tallest twin towers in Montreal.	
13	Icône	Icône	Montreal	146 (479)	39	2017		
13	KPMG Tower	KPMG Tower	Montreal	146 (479)	34	1987	Originally known as Maison des Coopérants and later as Place de la Cathédrale. The tallest building constructed in Montreal in the 1980s.	
15	Marriott Château Champlain	Marriott Château Champlain	Montreal	139 (454)	36	1967	Tallest hotel in Montreal.	
16	Le V / Courtyard Marriott Hotel	Le V	Montreal	138 (453)	40	2014		
17	Telus Tower	Telus Tower	Montreal	136 (445)	34	1962	Originally known as CIL House.	
18=	500 Place D'Armes	Le Tour de la Banque Nationale	Montreal	133 (435)	32	1968	Originally known as Tour Banque Canadienne Nationale.	
18=	Deloitte Tower	The Deloitte Tower	Montreal	133 (435)	26	2015		
20	Complexe Desjardins East Tower	Complexe Desjardins Tour Est	Montreal	130 (427)	32	1976		
21	Scotia Tower	Scotia Tower	Montreal	128 (420)	29	1990		
22=	National Bank Tower		Montreal	128 (420)	28	1983	National Bank Tower and 700 de la Gauchetière are the tallest twin office towers in Montreal.	
22=	700 de la Gauchetière		Montreal	128 (420)	28	1983	Le 700 de la Gauchetière and Tour de la Banque Nationale are the tallest twin office towers in Montreal. Previously known as Bell Canada Tower.	
22=	1000 Sherbrooke West		Montreal	128 (420)	28	1974		
25	Édifice Marie-Guyart	Edifice Marie Guyart	Quebec City	126.5 m (415 ft)	33	1972	The tallest building in Quebec City and Canada to the east of Montreal. 176.5 m (579 ft) tall with antenna.	
26=	Terminal Tower		Montreal	125 (410)	30	1966		
26=	Bell Media Tower	Bell Media Tower	Montreal	125 (410)	30	1988	Originally known as Montreal Trust Place and Maison Astral.	
28=	Altitude Montreal	Altitude Montréal	Montreal	124 (407)	33	2013	Was the tallest residential building in Canada east of Toronto until 2016.	
28=	Terrasses de la Chaudière – Tower 1	Terrasses de la Chaudière	Gatineau	124 m (406 ft)	30	1978	Tallest building in Ottawa-Gatineau.	
30=	Sun Life Building	Sun Life Building	Montreal	122 (400)	26	1931	The tallest building in Montreal from 1931 until the completion of Tour CIBC in 1962. The tallest building in the city completed prior to the 1960s.	
30=	Le Port Royal	Le Port Royal	Montreal	122 (400)	33	1964		
30=	Tom Condos	Tom Condos	Montreal	122 (400)	40	2018		
33	Tour de la Banque Royale		Montreal	121 (397)	22	1928		
34=	Holiday Inn Montréal Centre-Ville West		Montreal	120 (394)	40	2017		
34=	Humaniti Montréal		Montreal	120 (394)	39	2020	Architecturally topped out.	
34=	YUL Tower 1		Montreal	120 (394)	38	2018		
34=	Maison Manuvie		Montreal	120 (394)	27	2017		
38	Cité du Commerce Électronique		Montreal	118.8 (390)	27	2003		
39	Le Centre Sheraton		Montreal	117.6 (386)	38	1982		
40	Le Peterson		Montreal	115.2 (378)	34	2017		
41	Place du Canada		Montreal	113 (371)	27	1967		
42	Le 400		Montreal	112.5 (369)	37	2009		
43=	Complexe Jules Dallaire II		Quebec City	110 (361)	28	2014		
43=	Edifice Hydro Quebec		Montreal	110 (361)	27	1962		
43=	500 Boulevard René-Lévesque Ouest		Montreal	110 (361)	26	1983		
46	Le Complexe Desjardins Nord		Montreal	108 (354)	27	1976		
47	Édifice Place Hauteville et Hôtel Delta Québec		Quebec City	107 (351)	34	1974		
48	Tour Intact		Montreal	105.5 (346)	26	1973		
49=	Hotel Omni Montreal		Montreal	104 (341)	31	1976		
49=	Place Sherbrooke		Montreal	104 (341)	26	1976		
51=	1100 René-Levesque Boulevard		Montreal	102 (335)	27	1986		
51=	Place du Portage I		Gatineau	102 (335)	24	1973	First building in Gatineau to exceed 100 m (330 ft) in height.	
53	Port de Mer 1		Longueuil	101.4 (333)	30	1972	Tallest building in Longueuil.	
54	Le Crystal		Montreal	101 (331)	26	2008		
55	Plaza Tower		Westmount	100.9 (331)	33	1967	Tallest building in Westmount.	

== Tallest under construction or proposed ==
=== Under construction ===
The following is a list of buildings that are under construction in Quebec and are planned to rise at least 100 metres (330 ft).

Name	Location	Height m / ft	Floors	Year	Notes	Ref
Le Phare de Québec - Tour 1	Quebec City	250 m (820 ft)	65	2015	Mixed-use: office, residential, and hotel. Had it been completed, Tour 1 of the Le Phare de Québec complex would have become the tallest building in Quebec.	
800 Saint-Jacques Street West; National Bank of Canada Headquarters	Montreal	200 m (660 ft)	46	2022	Office. Began construction on 7 November 2018.	
Victoria sur le Parc	Montreal	200 m (660 ft)	56	2023	Mixed-use: office, residential and retail. Began construction March 2019.	
Maestria Tour B	Montreal	198.5 m (651 ft)	58	2023	Began construction on 26 September 2019. When completed in 2023, the complex will become the tallest twin buildings in Canada and the third tallest in North America.	
Maestria Tour A	Montreal	184.7 m (606 ft)	55	2023	Began construction on 26 September 2019. When completed in 2023, the complex will become the tallest twin buildings in Canada and the third tallest in North America.	
1 Square Phillips	Montreal	232 m (761 ft)	61	2024	Residential and mixed use. Construction expected to be completed by 2024.	
Le Phare de Québec - Tour 2	Quebec City	180 m (590 ft)	50	2015	Residential..	
Tour des Canadiens 3	Montreal	168 m (551 ft)	53	2021	Residential. Began construction March 2018	
Solstice	Montreal	147.5 m (484 ft)	44	2021	Residential. Began construction on 10 September 2019.	
Le Quinzecent	Montreal	138.8 m (455 ft)	37	2022	Residential. Began construction in March 2019.	
1111 Atwater	Montreal	135 m (443 ft)	35	2021	Mixed-use, Hotel, office. Began construction in 2019.	
628 Saint-Jacques	Montreal	120 m (390 ft)	35	2021	Residential. Began construction in May 2017.	
EvoloX	Montreal	120 m (390 ft)	36	2020	Residential.	
YUL Condos (East Tower)	Montreal	120 m (390 ft)	38	2020	Residential. Began construction November 2017	
Centre Hospitalier de l`Université de Montréal (CHUM)	Montreal	112.1 m (368 ft)	22	2020	Hospital.	

=== Proposed ===
The following is a list of buildings that have been proposed, but not approved yet, in Quebec and are planned to rise at least 100 metres (328 ft).

Name	City	Height m / ft	Floors	Year proposed	Notes	Ref
Centra Condos; 1000 de la Montagne	Montreal	143.6 m (471 ft)	45	2017	Residential. If approved, construction would be completed by 2022.	
Urbania Phase 2	Laval	103 m (338 ft)	32		Complex of 6 residential buildings, the tallest of which is 103 m (338 ft) tall.	

== Timeline of tallest buildings ==
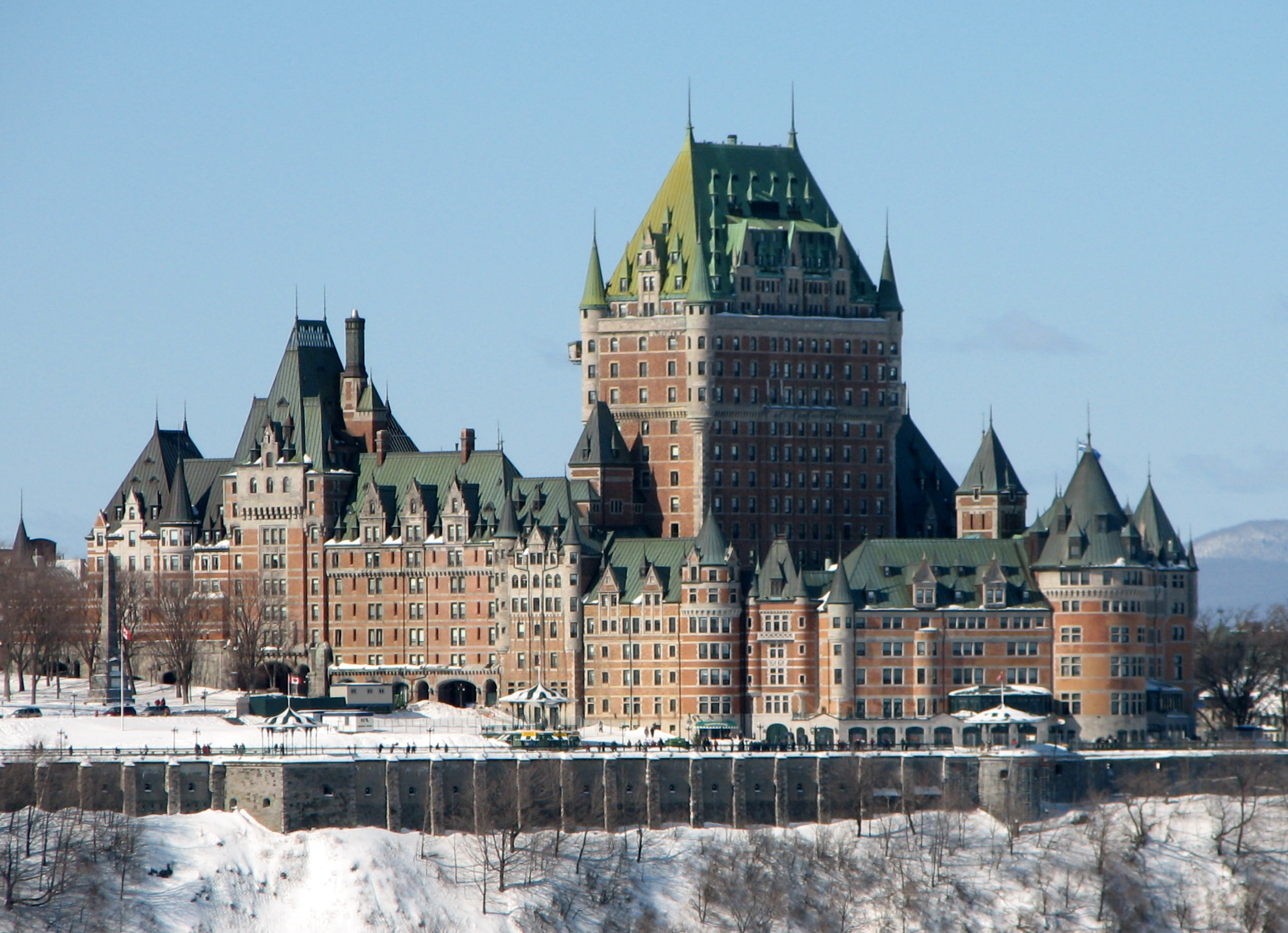
Château Frontenac was the tallest building in Quebec from the completion of its tallest tower in 1924 to the completion of Montreal's Royal Bank Tower in 1928.

This lists buildings that once held the title of tallest building in Montreal.

Name	Street address	Years as tallest	# of Years as tallest	Height m / ft	Floors	Reference
Notre Dame Basilica	Montreal	1829–1924	95 years	69 / 226	7	
Château Frontenac	Quebec City	1924–1928	4 years	80 / 260	18	
Royal Bank Building	Montreal	1928–1931	3 years	121 / 397	22	
Sun Life Building	Montreal	1931–1962	31 years	122 / 400	26	
Tour CIBC	Montreal	1962	<1 year	187 / 614	45	
Place Ville Marie	Montreal	1962–1964	2 years	188 / 617	47	
Tour de la Bourse	Montreal	1964–1992	28 years	194 / 637	47	
1000 de La Gauchetière	Montreal	1992–present	31 years (current)	205 / 673	51	

== See also ==
- List of tallest buildings in Canada
- List of tallest buildings in Ontario
- Canadian Centre for Architecture
