= Banque d'Hochelaga =

Defunct Canadian bank

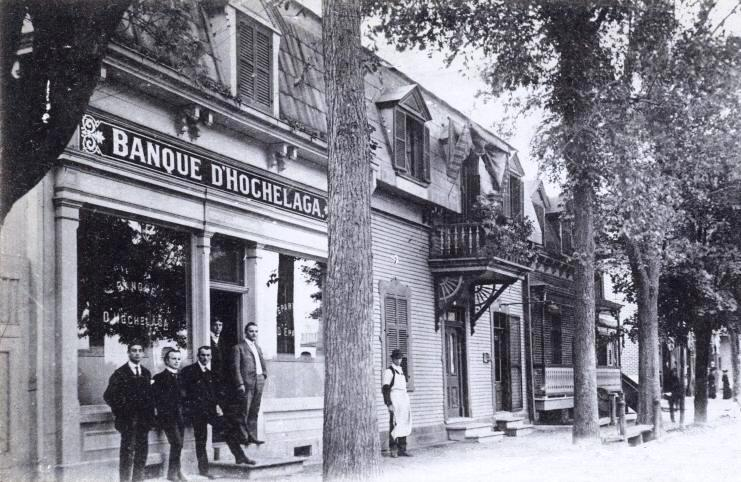
- Banque d'Hochelaga, Saint-Jérôme, Quebec, circa 1910.
- Industry: Bank
- Founded: 1873
- Fate: Merged into Banque Canadienne Nationale in 1924
- Headquarters: Montreal, Quebec

Banque d'Hochelaga (French pronunciation: [bɑ̃k dɔʃlaɡa], lit. 'Bank of Hochelaga') was a Canadian bank based in Montreal, Quebec. It was active from 1874 until 1924, when it merged with the Banque Nationale to form Banque Canadienne Nationale.

== History ==
In 1873, the Banque d'Hochelaga was incorporated as a result of the petitioning of the government by twelve traders. French-Canadian businessmen involved in its foundation include François-Xavier Saint-Charles, Louis-Amable Jetté, Frédéric-Liguori Béique and Louis Tourville. It began business in 1874.

It started with a paid-in capital of less than $400 000, which grew to $680 000 by 1881. In 1898, it reached its limit of $1 000 000.

The Banque d'Hochelaga was one of the "French banks"; banks run and largely financed by francophones. Between 1881 and 1921, no fewer than 76% of the bank's subscribed capital was controlled by francophones.

The bank opened branches in Montréal, Sherbrooke and St-Jérôme.

The collapse of the Banque Ville-Marie in 1899 lead to a bank run in the Banque d'Hochelaga. However, its high liquidity ratio of 32% allowed the bank to survive the run effortlessly.

Like the other Canadian chartered banks, it issued its own paper money. In 1934, the Bank of Canada was established as Canada's central bank through the Bank of Canada Act, and the commercial banks lost the right to issue their own currency.

After modest beginnings, the bank expanded substantially around 1900. At the end of World War I, Banque Nationale (based in Quebec City), Provincial Bank of Canada (Banque Provinciale) and Banque d'Hochelaga all competed to serve the French-speaking Quebec market.

In the last decades of its operation, the bank offered low salaries to its workers. In 1911, the average salary for the Banque d'Hochelaga's male clerks was of $853, whereas the average salary for all male bank clerks in Montreal was of $978.

In 1921, the Banque d'Hochelaga was the largest of the French banks with a total assets of 10 million dollars (compared to the Bank of Montreal's nearly 95 million dollars assets).

The Banque d'Hochelaga's attempt to move into English markets in the prairies resulted in disaster.

After financial reverses during a recession hurt the Banque Nationale at the beginning of the 1920s, it agreed to merge with Banque d'Hochelaga to form Banque Canadienne Nationale, with assistance provided by the Quebec provincial government. The merger was completed in 1924. The headquarters of the merged bank was in Montreal. The Provincial Bank chose not to participate in the merger.

== Presidents of Banque d'Hochelaga ==
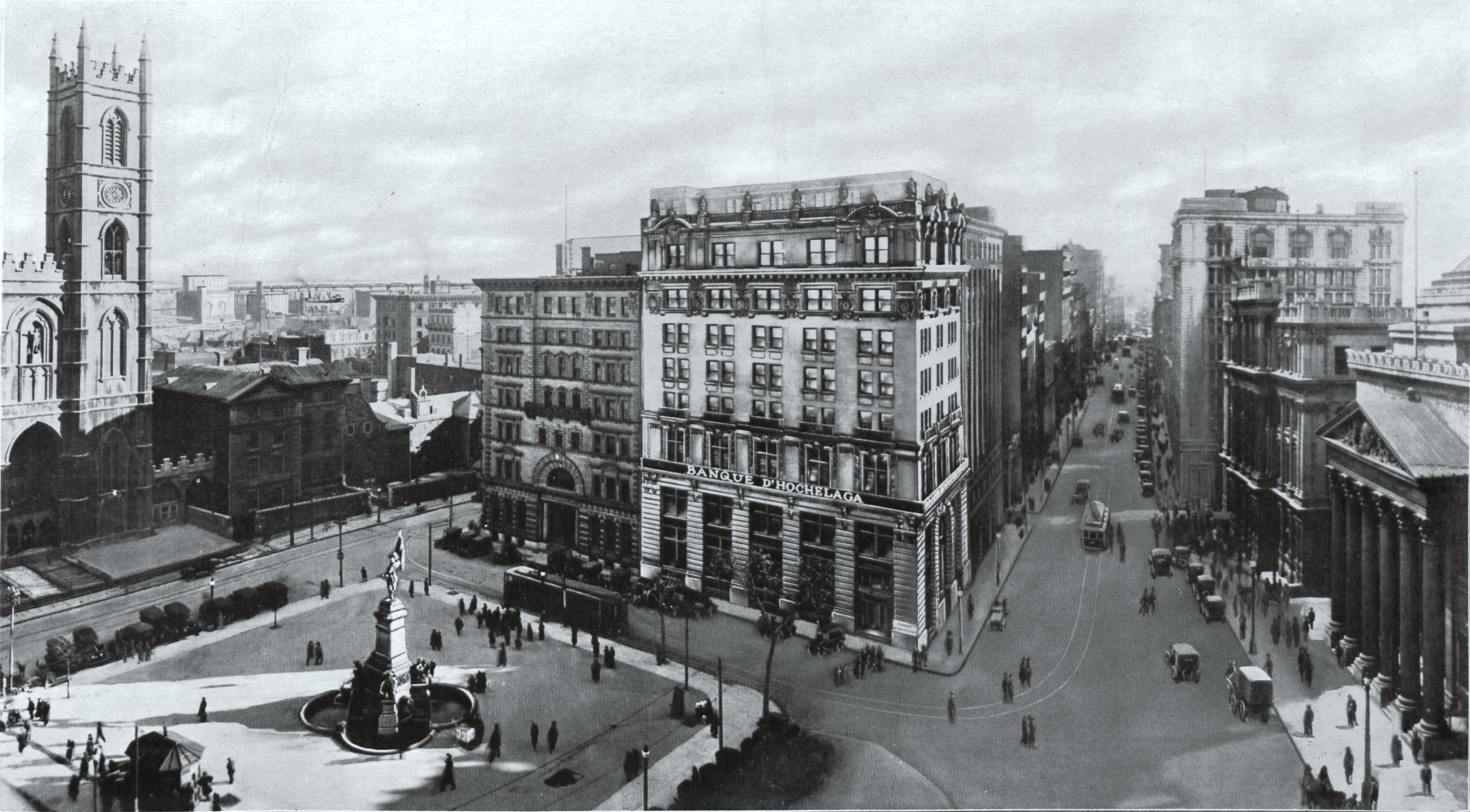
Banque d-Hochelaga, Montreal 1922

- 1874-1878: Louis Tourville
- 1878-1900: François-Xavier Saint-Charles
- 1900-1912: Jean-Damien Rolland
- 1912-1925: Janvier-A.Vaillancourt

== See also ==
- List of Canadian banks
