= Nu'uman Barau Danbatta =

Nigerian politician

Nu'uman Barau Danbatta Ajiyan Kazaure
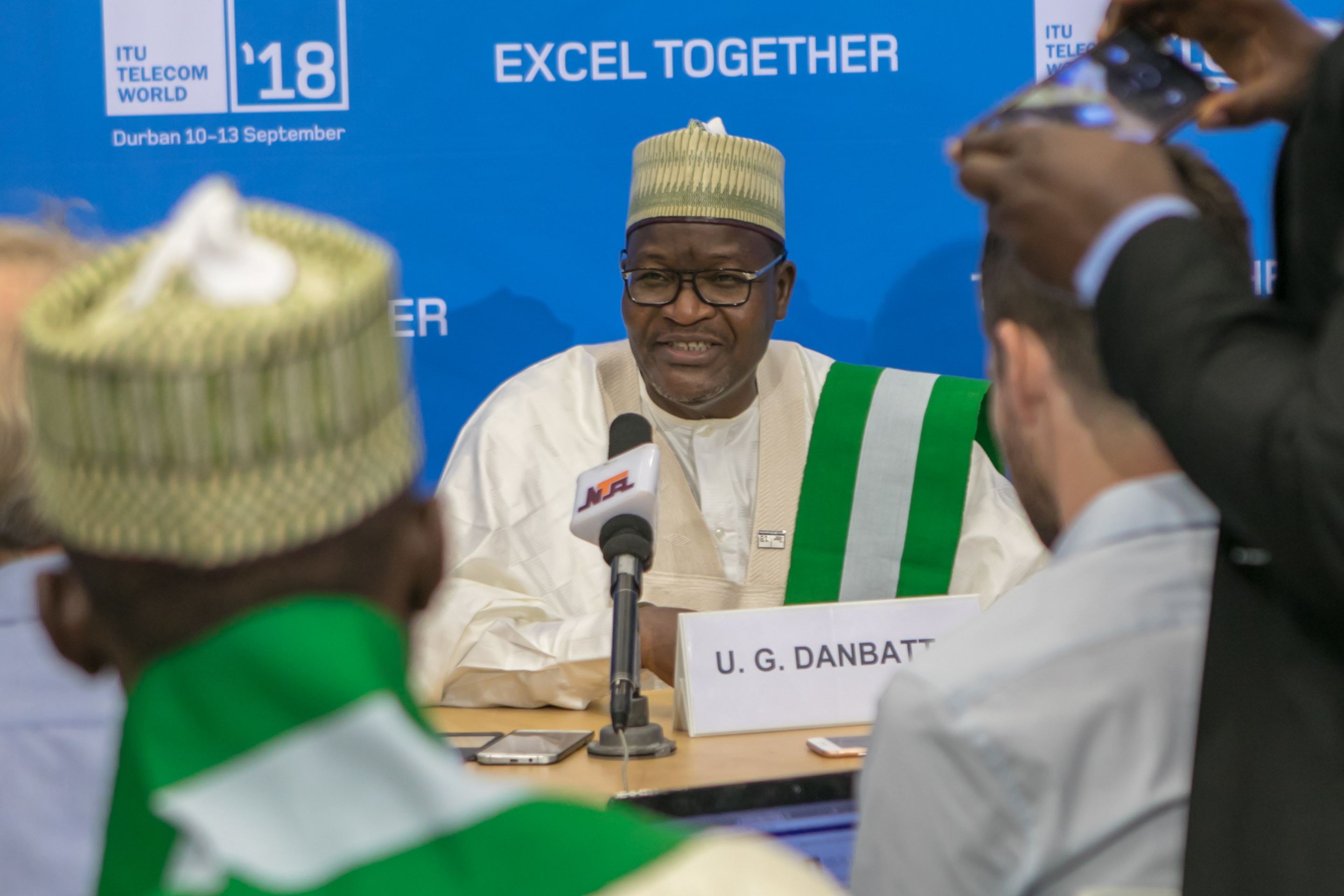

Chairman Unity Bank plc
- In office 28 May 2011 – 24 March 2014
- Succeeded by: Lamis Shehu

Federal Permanent Secretary
- In office 21 January 1998 – 1 January 2010

Personal details
- Born: 20 December 1955 (age 70) Kano Municipal, Northern Region,
- Education: Bayero University, Kano
- Occupation: Politician, Civil Servant, Traditional Ruler

Nuuman Barau Danbatta is a Nigerian politician, a civil servant that rose to the position of Permanent Secretary of the Ministry of Transportation, Federal Republic of Nigeria, the former chairman of Unity Bank plc, current chairman of Gracefield Island, and also holds a traditional title "Ajiyan Kazaure" Jigawa State.

== Early life and education ==
Danbatta was born on 20 December 1955 in Kano Municipal Local Government Area of Kano State, he attended Kwalli Primary School, Kano and attended Rumfa College, Kano for his secondary school education. He holds a degree in political science from Bayero University Kano.

== Career ==
Danbatta joined the Nigerian civil service and later served as a Permanent Secretary in the Federal Government. He was appointed Permanent Secretary of the Ministry of Transportation in 1998 and remained in the position until 2010.

== Banking career ==
Danbatta became chairman of Unity Bank in May 2011. He served as chairman until March 2014, when Lamis Shehu succeeded him.

== Academic activities ==
Danbatta has served on the board of trustees of the Bayero University Kano Endowment Fund. He also holds the traditional title of Ajiyan Kazaure in Jigawa State.
