= Michel Bélanger =

Canadian businessman and banker

- Born: September 10, 1929; Lévis, Quebec
- Died: December 1, 1997 (aged 68)
- Awards: Order of Canada

Michel Bélanger, CC (September 10, 1929 – December 1, 1997) was a Canadian businessman and banker.

He was an economic adviser to René Lévesque and helped to nationalize electricity. He was the first Francophone to become president of the Montreal stock exchange.

From 1976 until 1979, he was President of the Provincial Bank of Canada. After the Provincial Bank of Canada merged with Banque Canadienne Nationale to form the National Bank of Canada, he became the first President of the merged organization.

As a federalist, he was co-chairman of the Commission on the Political and Constitutional Future of Quebec, known as the Belanger-Campeau Commission.

In 1976 he was made an Officer of the Order of Canada and was promoted to Companion in 1993.
