= Hormisdas Laporte =

Canadian politician

The Honourable Sir Hormisdas Laporte
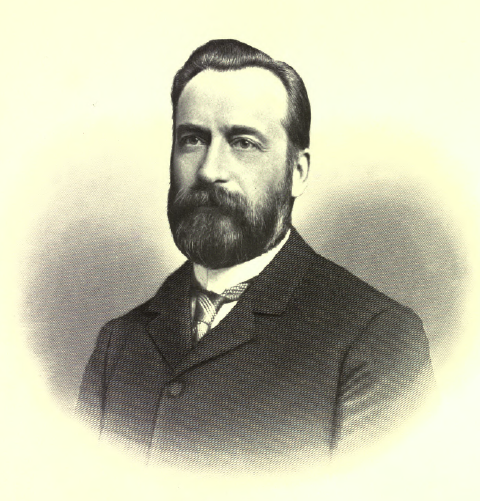

27th Mayor of Montreal
- In office 1904–1906
- Preceded by: James Cochrane
- Succeeded by: Henry Archer Ekers

Personal details
- Born: 7 November 1850 Lachine, Province of Canada
- Died: 20 February 1934 (aged 83) Montreal, Quebec, Canada
- Profession: businessman, financier

Sir Hormisdas Laporte, PC (7 November 1850 – 20 February 1934) was a Canadian businessman and financier. He served as Mayor of Montreal from 1904 to 1906. His first name is given as Hormidas in some sources.

== Biography ==
Laporte began working at the age of 17 in a nail factory and studied at night with a tutor. By the age of 20, he was working in a grocery and set up his own business within six months. He established Laporte, Martin and Co., a wholesale grocery, in 1881. The enterprise was successful despite instances of flooding and fire and he developed it into a chain. In 1892 he became the first president of the Alliance Nationale, a mutual aid society which evolved into a major Quebec insurance company.

He was elected to city council as an alderman in 1896 and became mayor eight years later. He was a reformer on council and wanted to curtail the growth of public expenditures and eliminate patronage and corruption. As mayor, he campaigned to abolish the public utility trusts in favour of public ownership of municipal services. As mayor with a strong majority, he brought the gas utility under municipal control but was unable to defeat the private trusts that controlled transit and electricity.

Laporte left the mayor's office in 1906 and, in 1907, became president of the Provincial Bank of Canada and remained so until his death.

During World War I he headed a government commission in charge of provisions and was appointed to the Queen's Privy Council for Canada. Following the war he was created a knight by King George V for his service.

After his death in 1934, he was entombed at the Notre Dame des Neiges Cemetery in Montreal.
