= 800 Saint-Jacques Street West =

Office skyscraper under construction in Montreal, Quebec, Canada

National Bank Place
- 800, rue Saint-Jacques
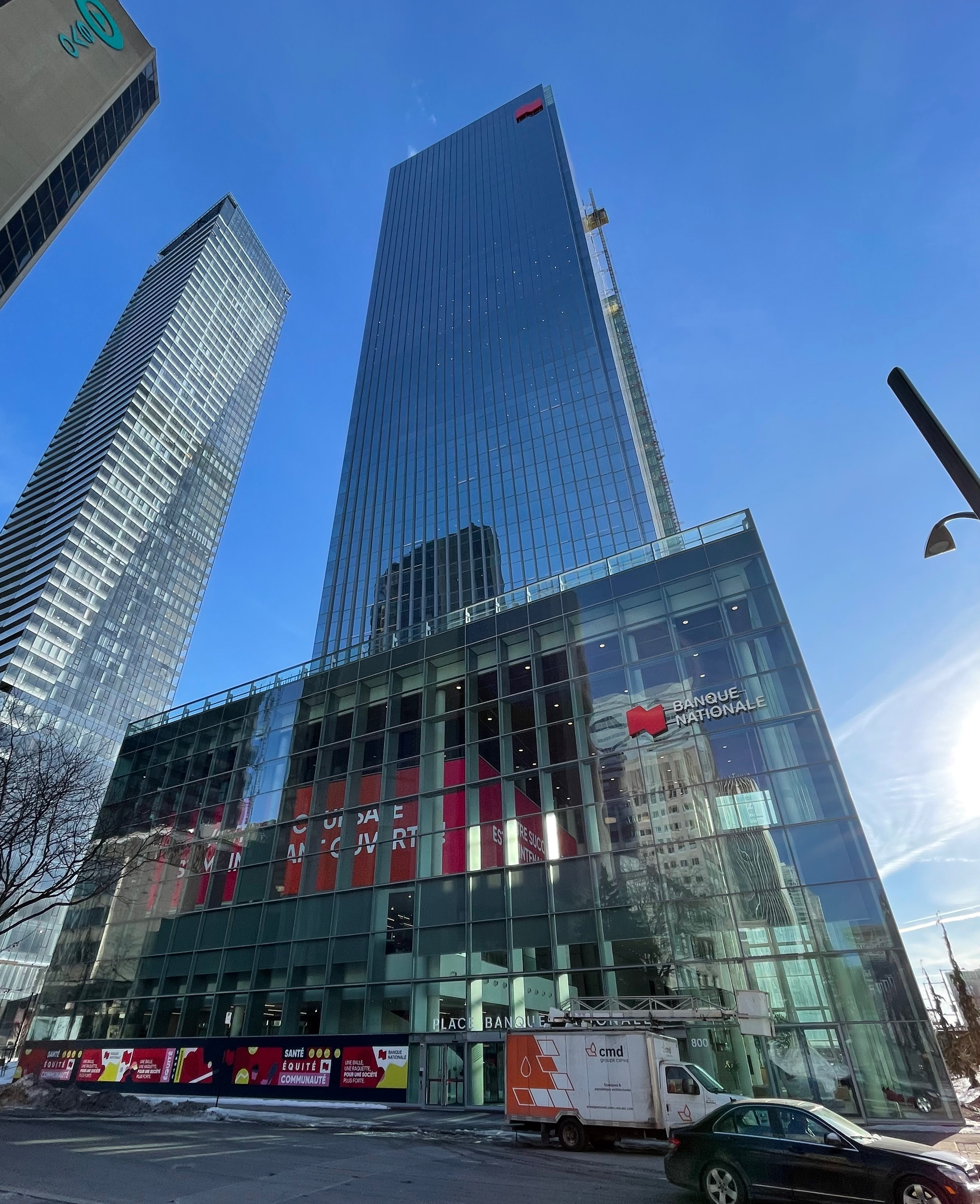
- Interactive map of the National Bank Place area

General information
- Status: Completed
- Type: Office
- Architectural style: Contemporary
- Location: Montreal, Quebec, Canada
- Coordinates: 45°30′8″N 73°34′18″W
- Construction started: 7 November 2018
- Opened: 2023

Height
- Architectural: 200 m (656 ft)

Technical details
- Floor count: 40
- Floor area: 92,903 m^{2} (1,000,000 sq ft)

Design and construction
- Architect: Menkes Shooner Dagenais LeTourneux Architectes
- Developer: Broccolini
- Structural engineer: WSP
- Main contractor: Pomerleau

Website
- www.bnc.ca

National Bank Place (French: Place Banque Nationale) is an office building in Montreal, Quebec, Canada. The building is located at 800 Saint-Jacques Street at the intersection of Boul Robert Bourassa in the Quartier de l’innovation of Downtown Montreal, and is linked to Montreal's Underground City.

National Bank of Canada is the sole occupant of the building. The building is the third tallest building in Montreal (tied with neighbouring Victoria sur le Parc).

== History ==
In January 2018, construction and real estate development firm Broccolini purchased the plot of land for C$100 million. Before being purchased the site was occupied by a public parking lot.

600 De La Gauchetière was put up for sale by the National Bank of Canada shortly after groundbreaking in November 2018, with the proceeds going toward the construction of their new headquarters.

== Design ==
The building features a glass and steel facade that points upward toward the south. It will also feature an outdoor garden on the 40th floor and be surrounded a large public park in order to introduce more greenspace into Downtown Montreal and attract foot traffic outside of the National Bank of Canada's business hours.

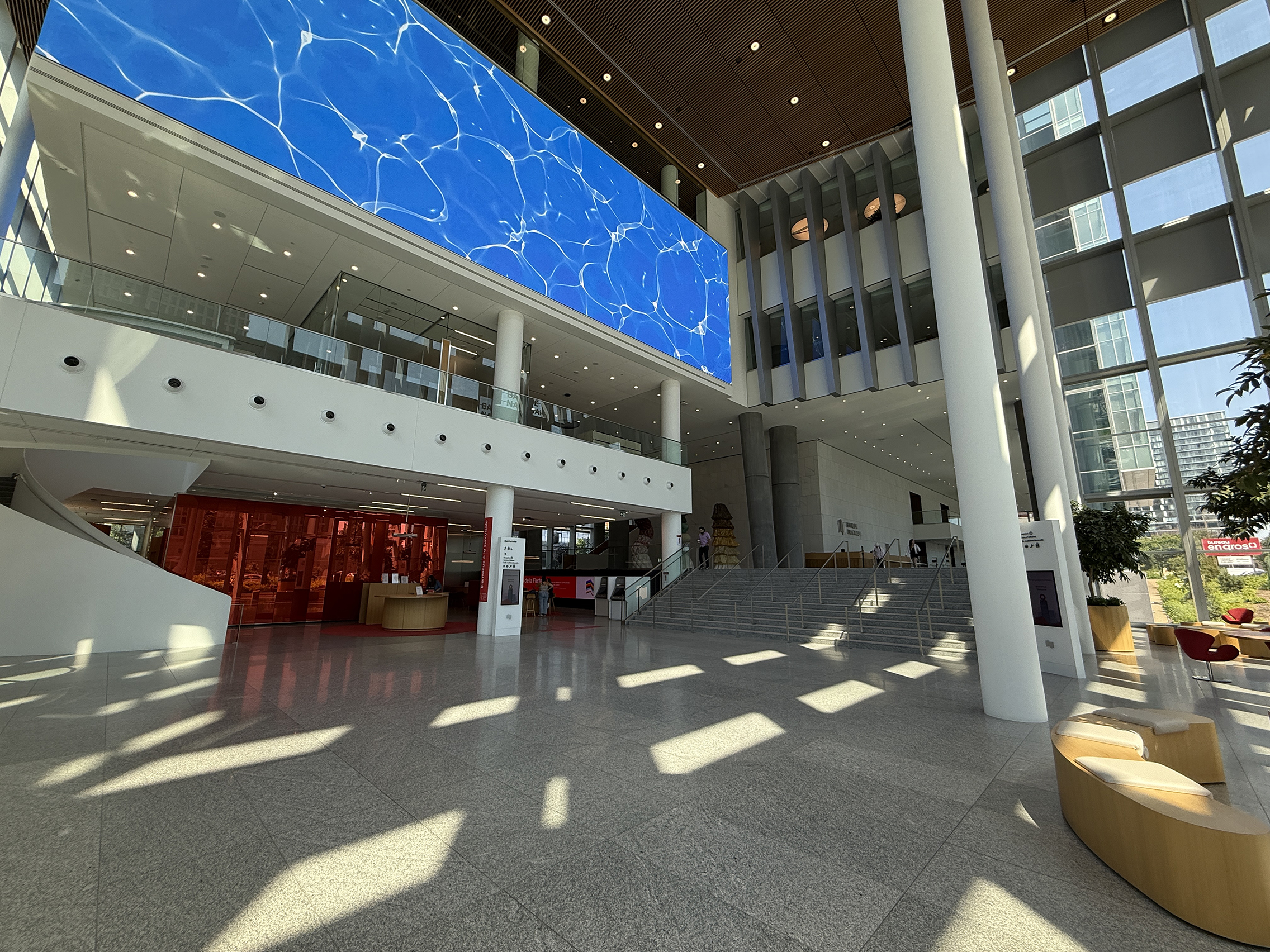
Office lobby

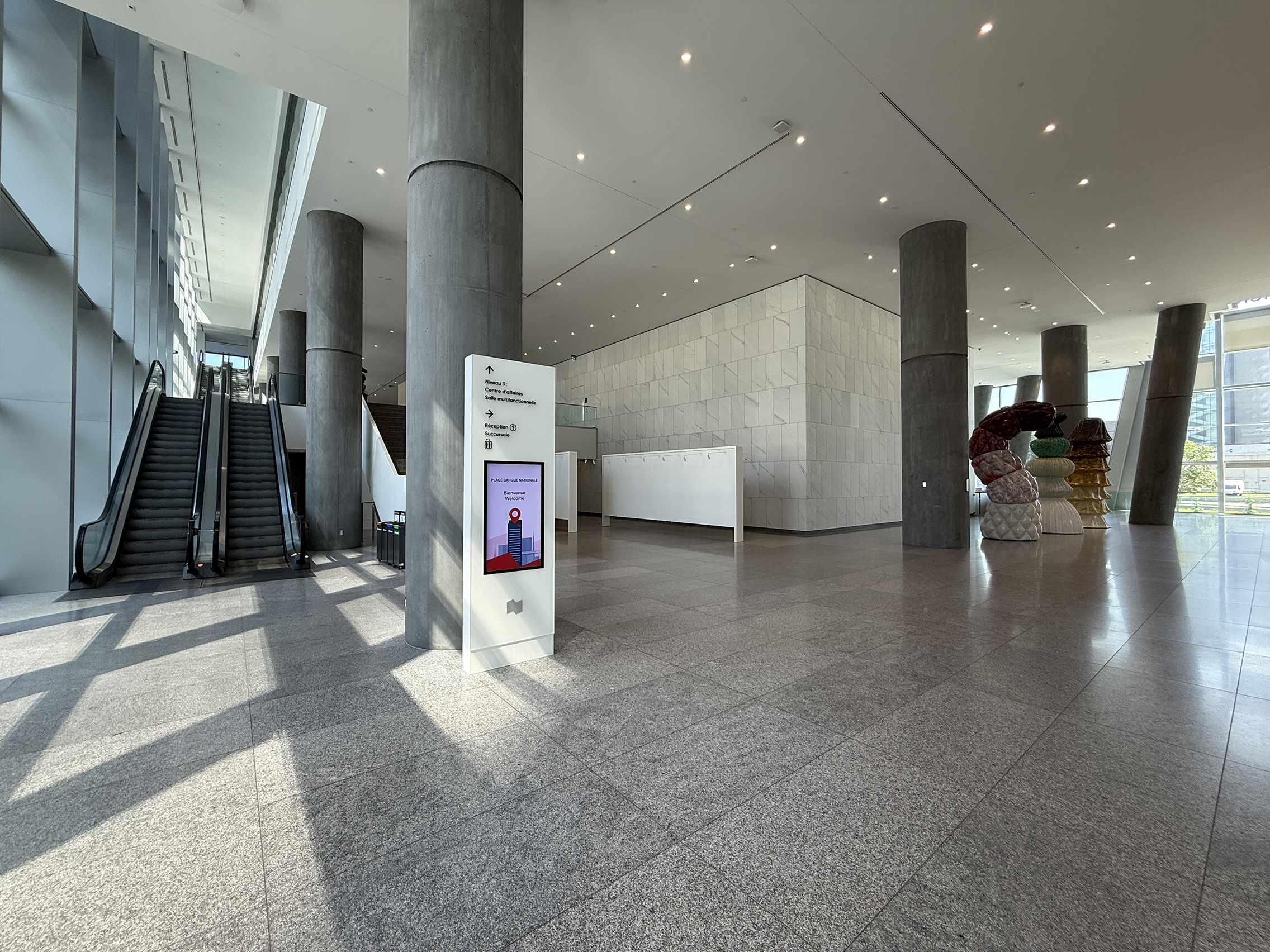
Another part of the lobby

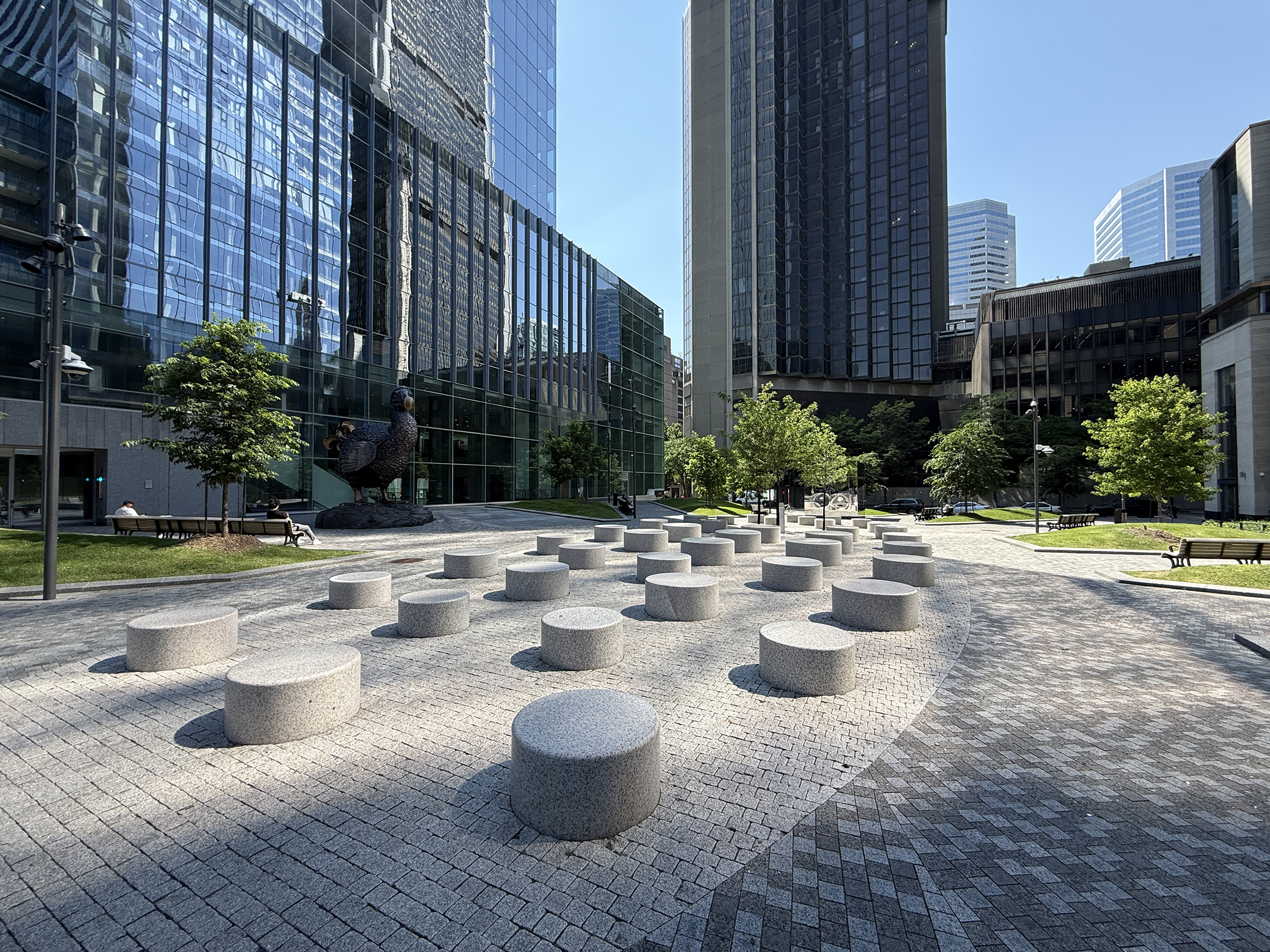
Michel-Belanger Park

== See also ==
- List of tallest buildings in Montreal
- List of tallest buildings in Quebec
