= Provincial Bank of Canada =

Canadian bank (1861–1979)

- Formerly: Banque Jacques-Cartier (1861–1900)
- Founded: 18 May 1861
- Defunct: 1 November 1979
- Fate: Merged with the Banque Canadienne Nationale
- Successor: National Bank of Canada

The Provincial Bank of Canada (French: Banque provinciale du Canada) was a Canadian bank that existed from 1861 to 1979. The bank was founded in Montreal as the Banque Jacques-Cartier, and on 7 May 1900 changed its name to the Banque provinciale.

== History ==
In 1970, the bank acquired the Banque populaire, which had been founded in 1848 as the Caisse d'économie de Notre-Dame de Québec. In 1977 it acquired the Unity Bank of Canada, a small Toronto bank founded in 1972.

It merged with the Banque Canadienne Nationale to form the National Bank of Canada in 1979.

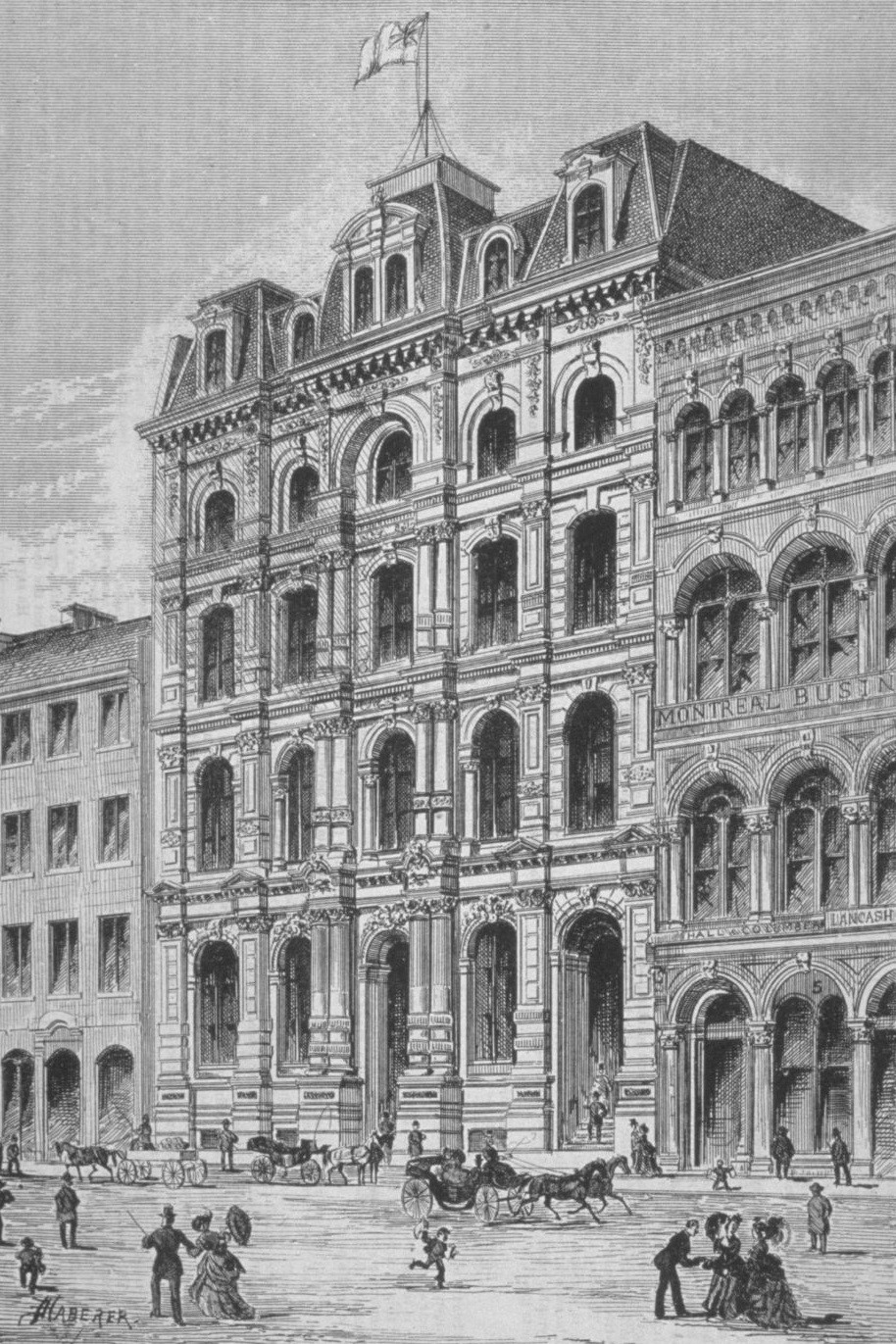
The headquarters on Place d'Armes, designed in 1872 by Henri-Maurice Perrault. It is now the site of the Aldred Building.

A notable President of the Bank was Sir Hormidas Laporte, who previously served as Mayor of Montreal, and occupied the position from 1907 to 1934.

== Leadership ==
=== President ===
1. Jean-Louis Beaudry, 1861–1869
2. Romuald Trudeau, 1869–1875
3. Alphonse Desjardins, 1880–1899
4. Guillaume-Narcisse Ducharme, 1900–1907
5. Sir Hormidas Laporte, 1907–1934
6. Stanislas-Jean-Baptiste Rolland, 1934–1936
7. Charles-Arthur Roy, 1936–1946
8. Joseph-Édouard Labelle, 1946–1957
9. Joseph-Ubald Boyer, 1957–1967
10. Léo Lavoie, 1967–1976
11. Michel Bélanger, 1976–1979

=== Chairman of the Board ===
1. Élie Beauregard
2. Jules-André Brillant

== See also ==
- List of banks in Canada
