= Sévère Rivard =

Canadian politician

The Honourable Sévère Rivard
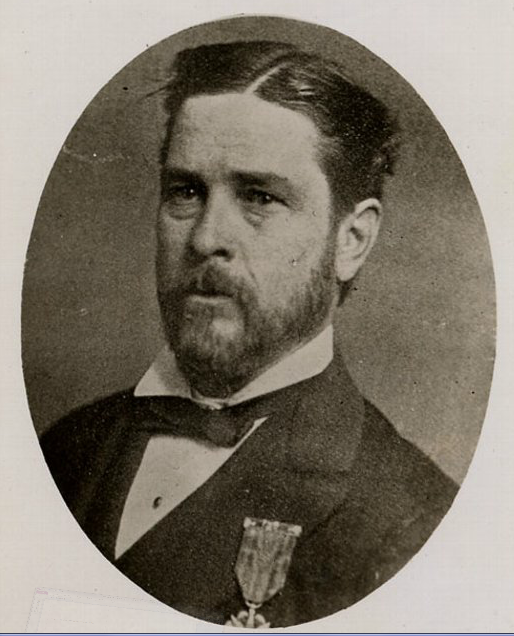

17th Mayor of Montreal
- In office 1879–1881
- Preceded by: Jean-Louis Beaudry
- Succeeded by: Jean-Louis Beaudry
- Constituency: Saint-Jacques

Member of the Legislative Council of Quebec for Alma
- In office 1886–1888
- Preceded by: Jean-Louis Beaudry
- Succeeded by: Louis Tourville

Personal details
- Born: 7 August 1834 Yamachiche, Quebec, Lower Canada
- Died: 4 February 1888 (aged 53) Montreal, Quebec, Canada
- Spouse: Delphine Choquette (m. 1863)
- Profession: Lawyer

Sévère-Dominique Rivard (7 August 1834 – 4 February 1888) was a Canadian lawyer and politician, the Mayor of Montreal, Quebec between 1879 and 1881.

After an education at the Séminaire de Nicolet, Rivard apprenticed in law under Rodolphe Laflamme and Edmund Barnard, formally becoming a lawyer in 1859.

In 1870, Rivard was elected to city council at the Saint-Jacques ward and was re-elected to council in 1873. Between 1870 and 1877 he also served as a member of the city's Roman Catholic Board of School Commissioners. Rivard campaigned for mayor in 1879, defeating the allegedly undefeatable incumbent Jean-Louis Beaudry by a 290-vote margin. He ran unopposed in the 1880 election and enjoyed a second term as Mayor.

He was a member of the Legislative Council of Quebec from 1886 until his death.

Rivard died on 4 February 1888 after sustaining a case of "paralysis". He was entombed at the Notre Dame des Neiges Cemetery in Montreal.
