= Rumfa College, Kano =

Rumfa College
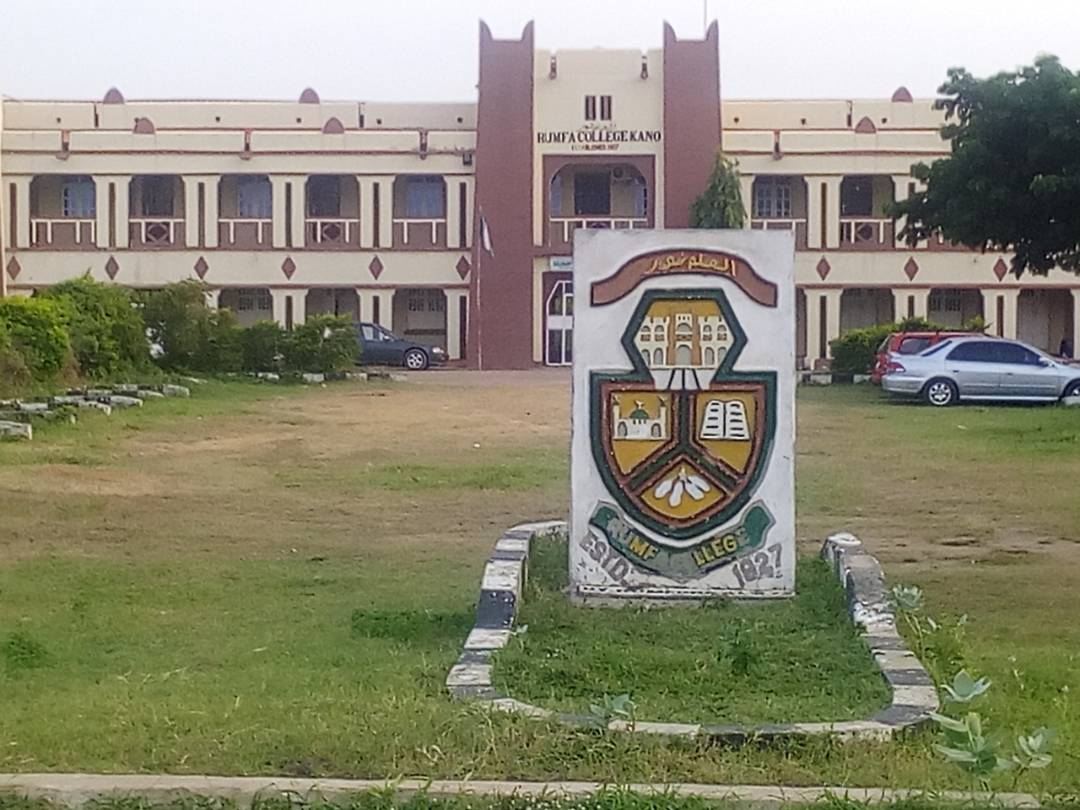

Location
- BUK Road, Kano; Kano, Nigeria
- Coordinates: 11°58′50″N 8°31′35″E

Information
- Type: Secondary school
- Established: 1927
- Founders: Sir Hugh Clifford, G. A. J. Bieneman
- Local authority: Kano State Science and Technical Board
- Staff: 50
- Gender: Boys
- Age: 11 to 18
- Colour: White
- Old Boys: ROMFOBA

Rumfa College is a high school located in the Northern part of Nigeria in Kano State, Founded in 1927 as a Kano Middle School (then changed to Kano Province School), it later was renamed to Government College Kano, and is now named Rumfa College, Kano. The name Rumfa came from the name of Muhammad Rumfa.

Rumfa College, once one of the largest boarding schools in Northern Nigeria, no longer operates as a boarding school. The school is known for a large number of elites from the region who attended. Its alumni include General Sani Abacha and General Murtala Mohammed who were former presidents of Nigeria, Dr. Ado Bayero the emir of Kano State, Governor of Jigawa State Mohammed Badaru Abubakar, former governor of Bauchi State Mohammed Abdullahi Abubakar, former chairman of Unity Bank plc Nu'uman Barau Danbatta.

== Notable alumni ==
Notable alumni of Rumfa include:

- Murtala Mohammed – 4th head of state of Nigeria
- Sani Abacha – 10th head of state of Nigeria
- Ado Bayero – former emir of Kano
- Mohammed Badaru Abubakar – Governor of Jigawa State
- Mohammed Abdullahi Abubakar – former governor Bauchi State
- Nu'uman Barau Danbatta – former chairman Unity Bank plc
- Aminu Kano – influential Nigerian revolutionary
