= André Bérard =

Canadian chief executive

- Born: August 13, 1940 (age 85); Bedford, Quebec
- Known for: President, Chief Executive Officer and Chairman of the Board of the National Bank of Canada
- Awards: Order of Canada; National Order of Quebec

André Bérard, OC OQ (born August 13, 1940) is a Canadian businessman and former president, chief executive officer and chairman of the board of the National Bank of Canada.

== Personal life ==
He was born in Bedford, Quebec.

== Career ==
He joined the National Bank of Canada in 1958, becoming president and chief operating officer in 1986. In 1990, he was named president and chief executive officer. He stepped down as president and CEO in 2002 and was chairman of the board until 2004. From 1986 to 1989, he was chair of the executive council of the Canadian Bankers Association.

He is currently a member or has been a member of the board of directors of the following companies: Bombardier Inc., BCE Inc., Noranda Inc., Saputo Inc., Falconbridge, Kruger Inc., Vasogen Inc. and the Groupe Canam Inc.

In 1995, he was made an Officer of the Order of Canada for his "remarkable demonstration of his leadership qualities". In 2000, he was made an Officer of the National Order of Quebec. He has received two honorary doctorates from the University of Ottawa and from the École des Hautes Études Commerciales of the Université de Montréal.
