= Le Phare de Québec =

Proposed skyscraper in Quebec City, Quebec, Canada

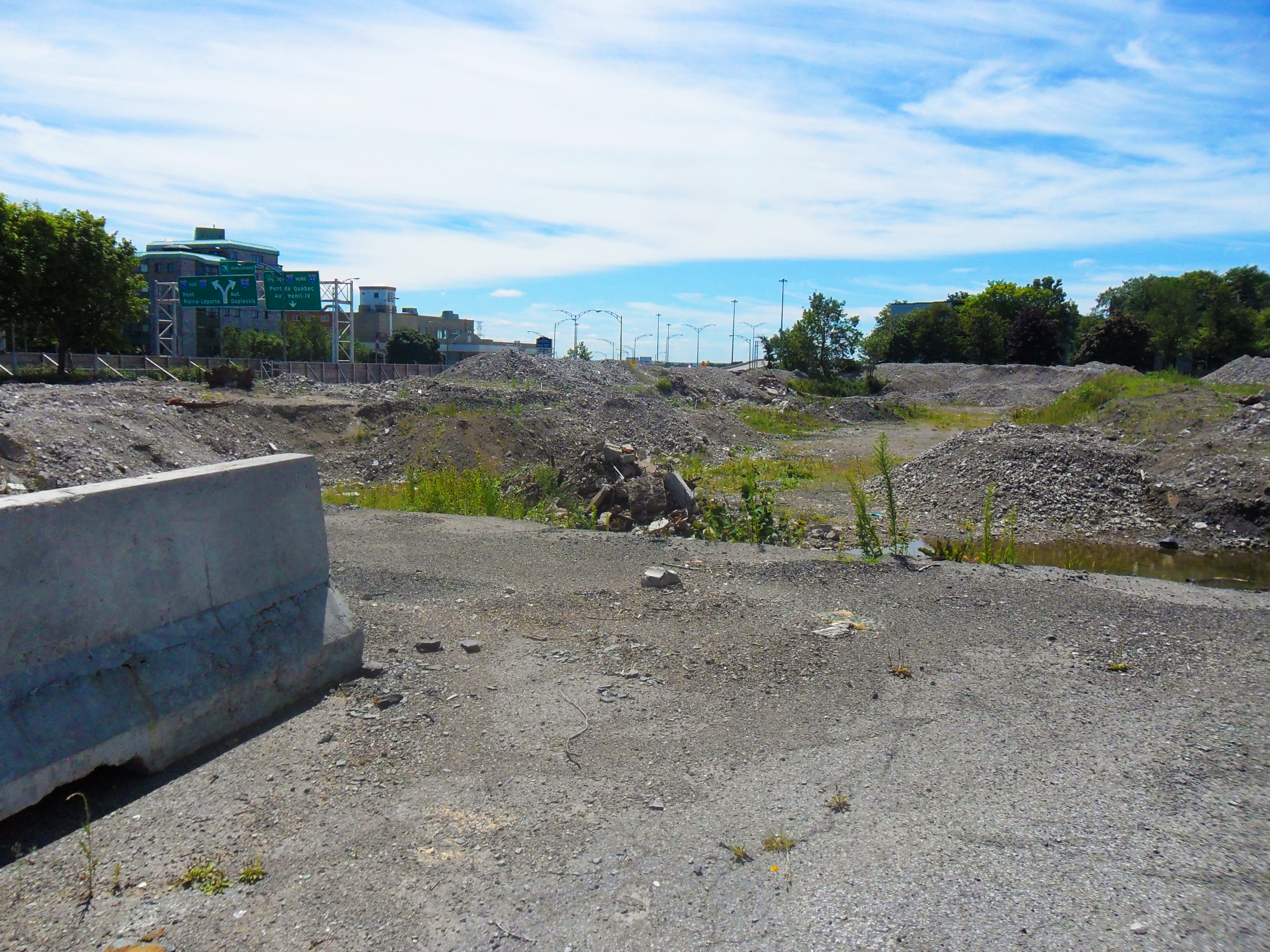
- Interactive map of the Le Phare de Québec area

General information
- Status: Approved
- Type: Mixed use
- Location: Quebec City, Quebec, Canada
- Coordinates: 46.764633°N 71.295481°W
- Construction started: Never
- Completed: Never
- Cost: $755,000,000

Height
- Architectural: 250 m (820 ft)

Technical details
- Floor count: 65
- Floor area: 185,806.1 m^{2} (2,000,000 sq ft)

Design and construction
- Architects: Alpha Architecture; Gensler
- Developer: Groupe Dallaire

Website
- www.lephareqc.ca

Le Phare de Québec (English: The Quebec Lighthouse) was an approved project located on Laurier boulevard in the former city of Sainte-Foy within the borough of Sainte-Foy–Sillery–Cap-Rouge in Quebec City, Quebec, Canada.

The complex had 4 towers: Tour 1 at 250 metres and 65 floors, Tour 2 at 180 metres and 50 floors, Tour 3 at 110 metres and 30 floors, and Tour 4 at 60 metres and 17 floors. Tour 1 would have been the tallest building in Quebec and the tallest building in Canada east of Toronto. The 25,083 square-metre site sits on the former location of Hotel Governors, which was demolished in 2013. The total floor area of the complex was more than 186,000 square metres, consisting primarily of office, commercial, residential, and hotel space. The complex featured a 750-seat multimedia concert hall.

The construction of the complex has been controversial for the city's residents. Concerns include aesthetics, increased local wind speeds, and unfair competition with buildings in neighbouring boroughs due to the building's large floor space.

== See also ==
- List of tallest buildings in Quebec City
- List of tallest buildings in Quebec
