= Trefflé Berthiaume =

Canadian politician

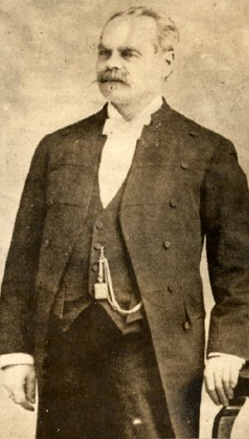

Member of Legislative Council of Quebec for Alma
- In office November 16, 1896 – January 2, 1915
- Preceded by: Louis Tourville
- Succeeded by: Médéric Martin

Personal details
- Born: August 4, 1848 Saint-Hugues, Lower Canada
- Died: January 2, 1915 (aged 66) Outremont, Quebec, Canada
- Party: Conservative Party of Quebec

Trefflé Berthiaume (August 4, 1848 – January 2, 1915) was a Canadian typographer, newspaperman and politician.

He was born in Saint-Hugues, Lower Canada as one of the five children of Gédéon Berthiaume and Éléonore Normandin. Berthiaume was only four years old when his father died. In 1859, after his primary schooling, he joined the Séminaire de Saint-Hyacinthe. After school, he was an apprentice to a tailor for more than two years. In 1863, he started training as a typographer, a profession which he worked in for some time. In 1884, he founded the Gebhardt and Berthiaume Lithographing and Printing Company Limited. In 1884, he was a co-founder of the magazine Le Monde illustré. In 1889, he became in charge of the editing, printing, and distribution of the Montreal newspaper La Presse. He became the owner in 1894. What was once "a struggling paper of doubtful prospects", he helped La Presse to become a sensationalistic people's paper, drawing from American "yellow journalism" of the time. It once featured drawings of a female murderer's thoughts.

He was called to the Legislative Council of Quebec for the division of Alma in 1896 and served until his death in 1915.

He died in Montreal in 1915 and is buried in the Notre Dame des Neiges Cemetery.
