= Maison Manuvie =

Coordinates: 45.5017°N 73.5732°W

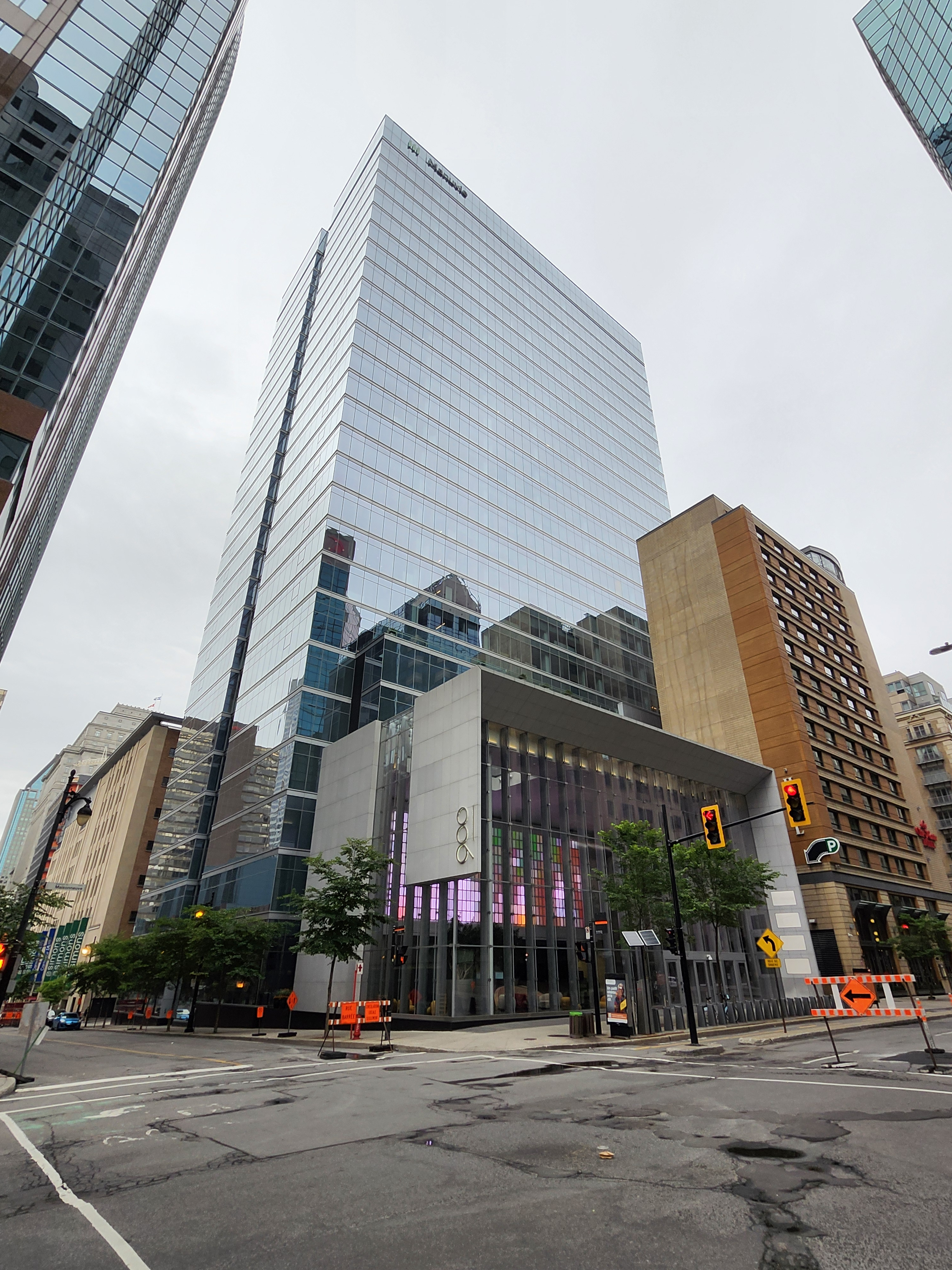
- Interactive map of the Maison Manuvie area

General information
- Status: Completed
- Type: Office
- Location: 900 Boulevard De Maisonneuve Ouest, Montréal, Canada
- Current tenants: Manuvie, EY, Boralex
- Construction started: 2015
- Completed: 2017
- Inaugurated: November 27, 2017
- Cost: C$220 million
- Owner: Ivanhoé Cambridge, Manuvie

Height
- Height: 114 metres (374 ft)

Technical details
- Floor count: 27

Design and construction
- Architecture firm: Menkès Shooner Dagenais Letourneux
- Awards: WiredScore

Maison Manuvie, located at 900 De Maisonneuve Ouest, in the heart of downtown Montreal, is a building completed in 2017. Developed by Ivanhoé Cambridge and co-owned with Manulife, Maison Manuvie is a $220 million, Class AAA office building. It is part of a plan by Ivanhoé Cambridge to invest C$1 B into Montreal's downtown core. The building is the work of architectural firm Menkès Shooner Dagenais LeTourneux.

== Features ==
Located between Mansfield Street and Metcalfe Street, Maison Manuvie houses 27 floors and is 114 meters high. The building offers services, including a café, a conference centre, an outdoor terrace, 360 parking spaces, more than 125 bicycle parking spaces and 45,200 square meters of office space. The building is connected to the underground RESO network and the Montreal Metro via McGill Station.

== Distinctions and certifications ==
Maison Manuvie is distinguished by the development of its timeless architecture and high-efficiency focus on sustainable development, which aims to achieve LEED CS Gold certification.

The building is also the first one in Quebec to achieve WiredScore Platinum certification.

In 2017, Maison Manuvie won an Americas Property Award in the Office Development, Canada category from the International Property Awards.

== Major tenants ==
The building will consolidate some of the activities of Manulife and the Canadian sector of Standard Life, which was acquired by Manulife in the fall of 2014. The team moved into the building in 2017.

EY announced in 2017 that it would move into Maison Manuvie. Boralex, an international renewable energy company headquartered in Quebec, has selected Maison Manuvie as its new home in downtown Montreal. The team moved into its new spaces in 2018.

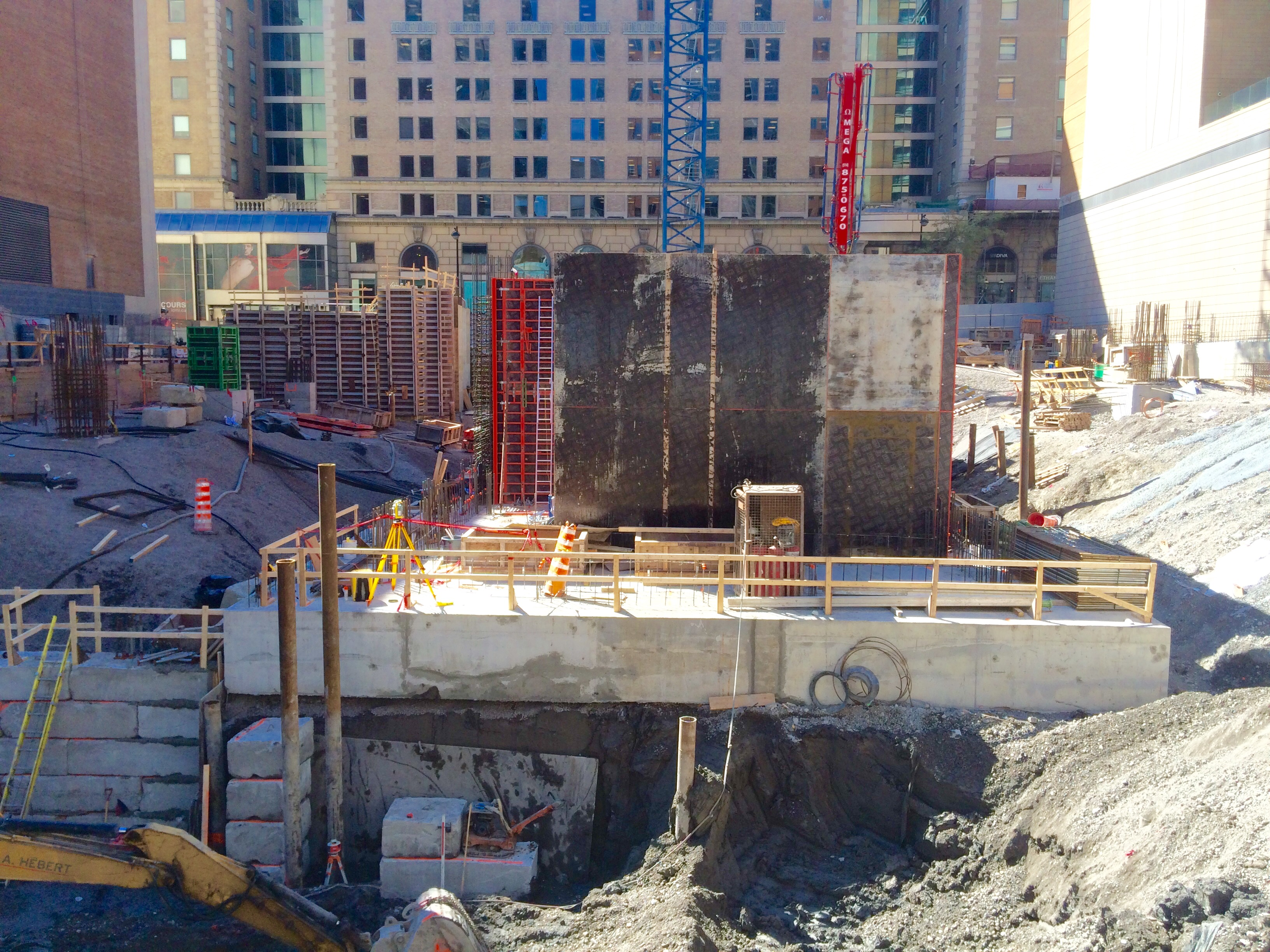
Construction site in September 2015

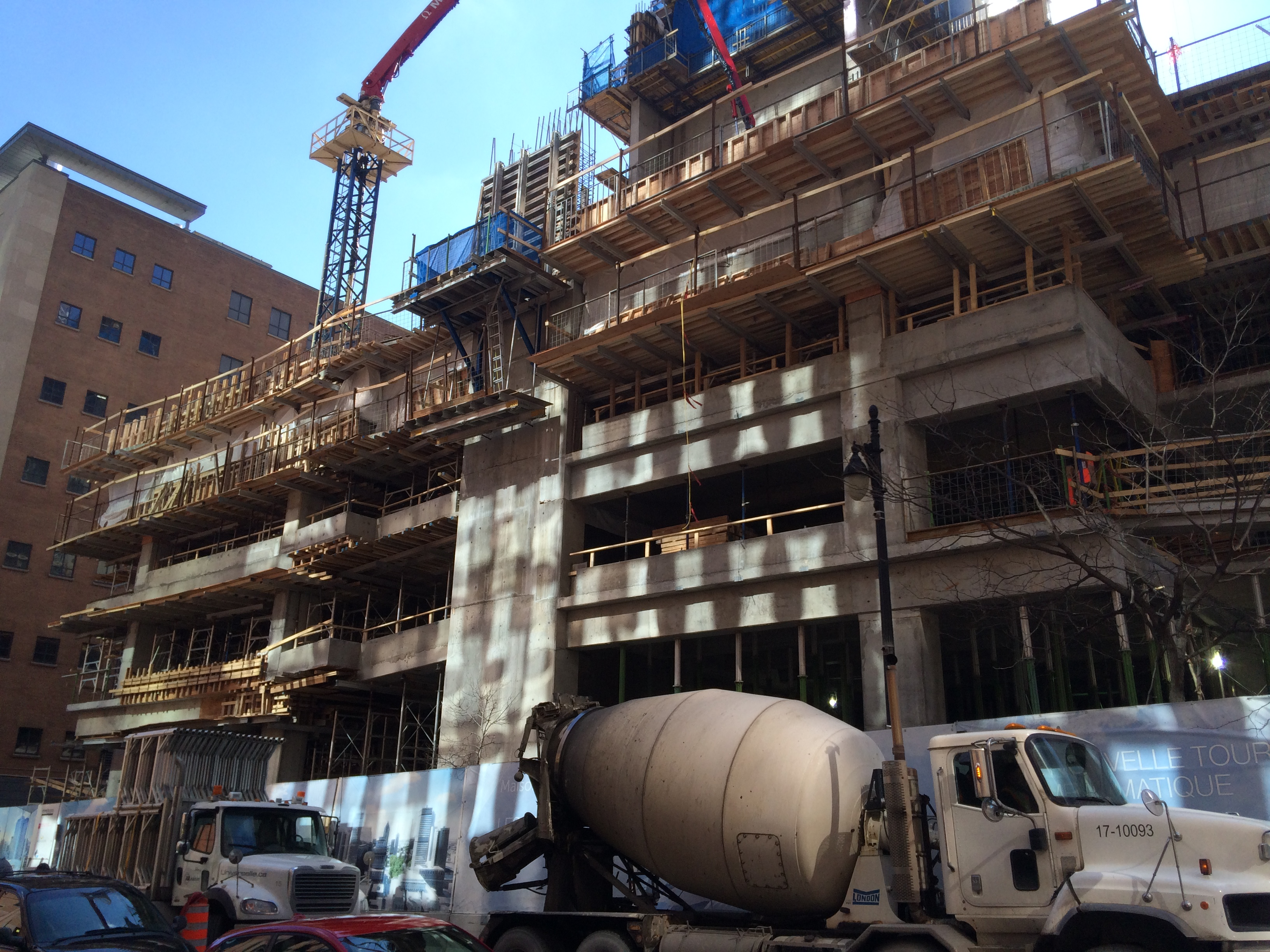
Construction site in March 2016
