= Banque Canadienne Nationale =

Canadian bank (1873–1979)

- Formerly: Banque d'Hochelaga (1873–1924)
- Industry: Banking
- Founded: 3 May 1873
- Defunct: 1 November 1979
- Fate: Merged with the Provincial Bank of Canada
- Successor: National Bank of Canada
- Headquarters: 500 Place d'Armes, Montreal, Quebec

The Banque Canadienne Nationale (French pronunciation: [bɑ̃k kanadjɛn nɑsjɔnal]; lit. 'Canadian National Bank') was a Canadian bank that existed from 1873 to 1979. The bank was founded in Montreal in 1873 as the Banque d'Hochelaga and began operations the following year. In 1924, the bank renamed itself the Banque Canadienne Nationale after it took over the Banque nationale. In 1979, it merged with the Provincial Bank of Canada to form the National Bank of Canada.

== History ==
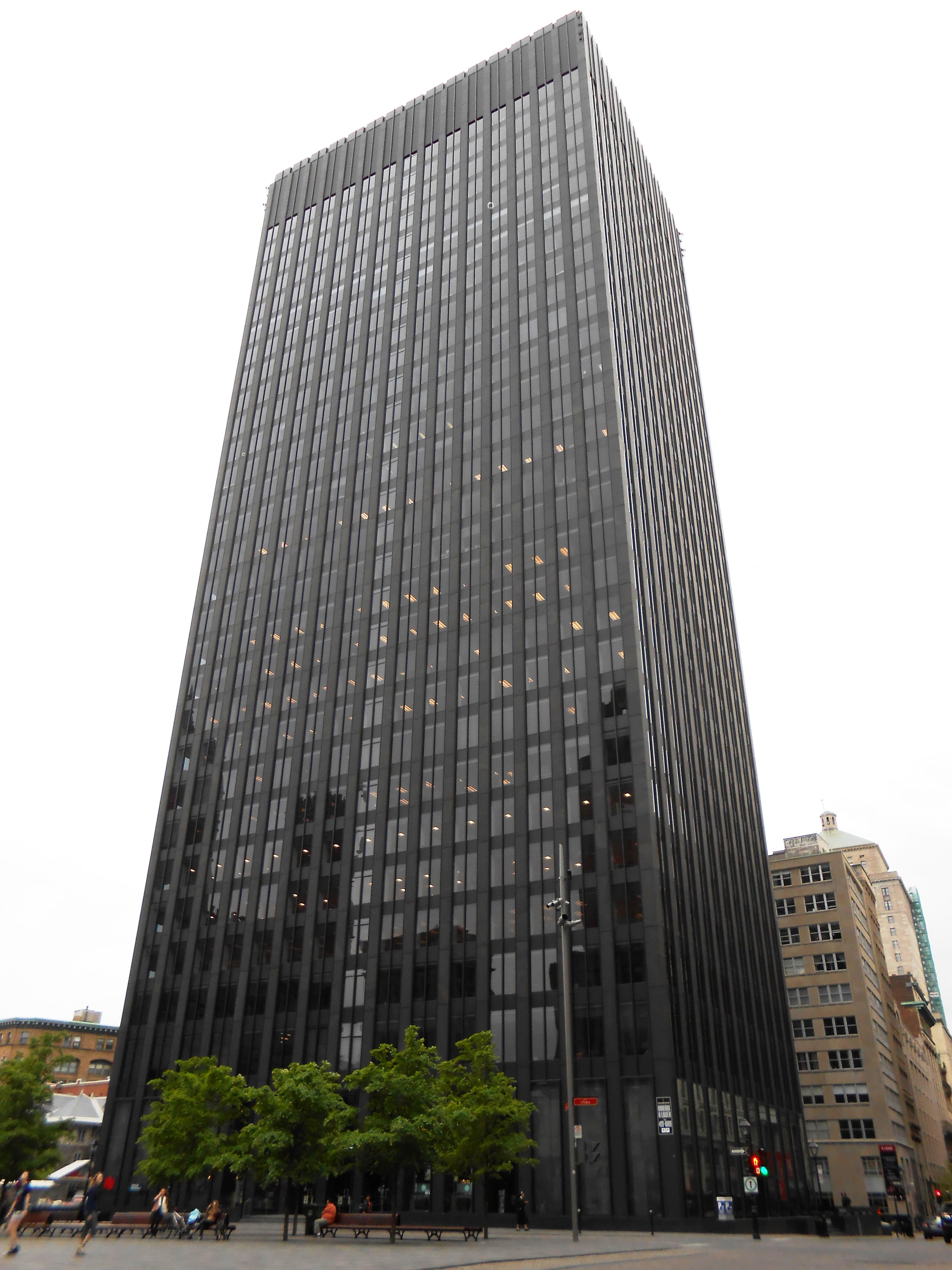
The bank's 1965 headquarters on Place d'Armes in Montreal, designed by David, Barott & Boulva.

In 1859, several prominent Quebecers founded the Banque Nationale in Quebec City as a banking institution controlled by French-speaking businessmen.

In 1924, the Banque Nationale, which was struggling financially while caught-up in a serious recession, merged with the Banque d'Hochelaga (founded in Montreal in 1874) to create the Banque Canadienne Nationale (BCN, Canadian National Bank). The Quebec provincial government, under Alexandre Taschereau, issued $15 million in bonds to facilitate the merger.

Like the other Canadian chartered banks, BCN issued its own paper currency until the Bank of Canada Act of 1934 created the Bank of Canada and it relinquished this right.

In 1968, Banque Canadienne Nationale was one of the four original banks to form CHARGEX Ltd. through a licence from BankAmericard, providing Canada with its first interbank credit card.

In 1979, Banque Canadienne Nationale and the Provincial Bank of Canada (Banque provinciale du Canada), another Quebec-based bank, joined to form the National Bank of Canada.

== Leadership ==
=== President ===
1. Louis Tourville, 1874–1878
2. François-Xavier Saint-Charles, 1878–1900
3. Jean-Damien Rolland, 1900–1912
4. Janvier-Arthur Vaillancourt, 1912–1928
5. Frédéric-Liguori Béique, 1928–1933
6. Joseph-Marcellin Wilson, 1933–1934
7. Jean-Baptiste-Beaudry Leman, 1934–1947
8. Charles-Edouard Gravel, 1947–1950
9. Charles St-Pierre, 1950–1960
10. Ulric Roberge, 1960–1964
11. Louis Hébert, 1964–1974
12. Germain Perreault, 1974–1979

=== Chairman of the Board ===
1. Wilfrid Gagnon, 20 January 1961 – 10 June 1963
2. François-Philippe Brais, 1964–1968
3. Louis Hébert, 1968–1978
4. Germain Perreault, 1978–1979

== See also ==
- List of Canadian banks
- 500 Place D'Armes
