= Jean-Louis Beaudry =

Canadian entrepreneur and politician

The Honourable Jean-Louis Beaudry MLC
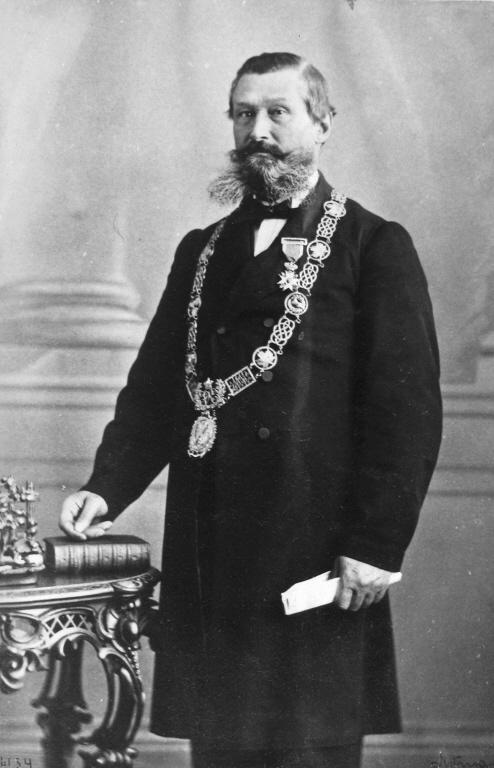

11th Mayor of Montreal
- In office 1862–1866
- Preceded by: Charles-Séraphin Rodier
- Succeeded by: Henry Starnes
- In office 1877–1879
- Preceded by: William Hales Hingston
- Succeeded by: Sévère Rivard
- In office 1881–1885
- Preceded by: Sévère Rivard
- Succeeded by: Honoré Beaugrand

Member of the Legislative Council of Quebec for Alma
- In office November 2, 1867 – June 25, 1886
- Succeeded by: Sévère Rivard

Personal details
- Born: March 27, 1809 Sainte-Anne-des-Plaines, Lower Canada
- Died: June 25, 1886 (aged 77) Montreal, Quebec, Canada
- Resting place: Notre Dame des Neiges Cemetery
- Relatives: Prudent Beaudry (brother)
- Profession: businessman

Jean-Louis Beaudry (March 27, 1809 – June 25, 1886) was a Canadian entrepreneur and politician. Beaudry served as mayor of Montreal three times, from 1862 to 1866, from 1877 to 1879, and from 1881 to 1885 for a total time served as mayor of ten years.

== Early life ==
Born in Sainte-Anne-des-Plaines, Quebec, he was raised and worked on the family farm. After working as a clerk and shopkeeper, Beaudry opened a dry goods store with his brother in 1834. Beaudry became increasingly politically active. In 1827 he signed a petition in opposition to the proposed union of the upper and lower Canadas. In 1837 he became one of the vice presidents of the Société des Fils de la Liberté. When the Rebellions of 1837 occurred, Beaudry fled temporarily to the United States. He returned in June 1838 and resumed his business dealings which flourished.

== Political career ==
Having established himself as a successful businessman, in 1860 Beaudry ran and was elected councillor. In 1862 he ran for mayor of Montreal and won. He was easily re-elected through 1885. He declined to run for a couple of years, but ran again in 1868 against William Workman. During the campaign Beaudry turned off voters with religious and negative overtones. Beaudry did not run for mayor again until 1877, where he won, and again in 1878. However, in 1879 he lost in a fierce campaign against Sévère Rivard. Beaudry was once again re-elected from 1881 through 1885. His younger brother Prudent Beaudry was mayor of Los Angeles (1874–1876).

He was a member of the Legislative Council of Quebec from 1867 until his death in 1886. He was buried in the Notre Dame des Neiges Cemetery.

== Accomplishments ==
During his 10 years served as mayor of Montreal, Beaudry:

- established fire and health departments
- inauguration of a City Hall on Notre-Dame Street
- was instrumental in keeping peace between the Protestants and Catholics through halting the Orange Order
