= Louis Tourville =

Canadian politician

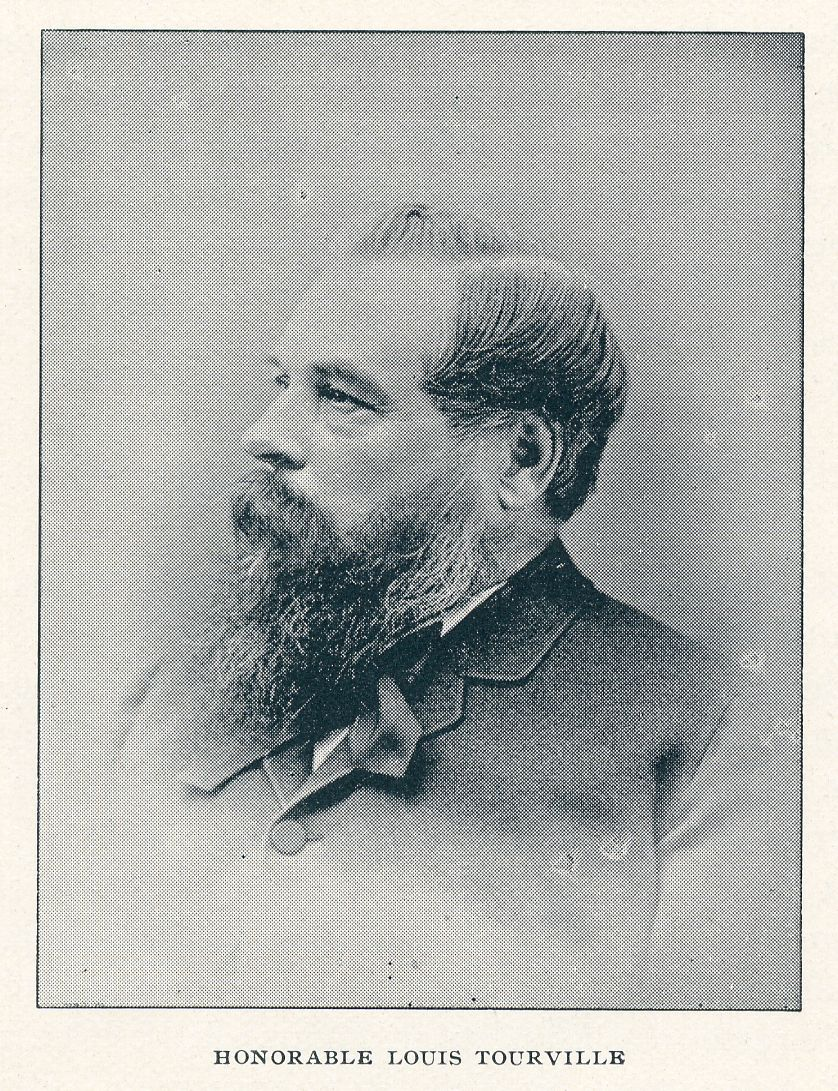

Member of the Legislative Council of Quebec for Alma
- In office 1888–1896
- Preceded by: Sévère Rivard
- Succeeded by: Trefflé Berthiaume

Personal details
- Born: 22 February 1831 Montreal, Lower Canada
- Died: 4 November 1896 (aged 65) Montreal, Quebec
- Party: Liberal
- Children: Rodolphe Tourville

Louis Tourville (22 February 1831 – 4 November 1896) was a Canadian banker and politician.

Born in Montreal, Lower Canada, Tourville was a founder of the Banque d'Hochelaga in 1873 and was its first president until 1878. In 1888, he was appointed to the Legislative Council of Quebec for the division of Alma. A Liberal he served until his death in Montreal in 1896. His son, Rodolphe Tourville, was also a Quebec politician.
