= Complexe Maisonneuve =

General information
- Status: Completed
- Type: Office
- Architectural style: Modern
- Location: 600 Rue De la Gauchetière Ouest and 1001 Boulevard Robert-Bourassa, Montreal, Quebec, Canada
- Coordinates: 45.50186°N 73.56384°W
- Completed: 1983

Height
- Roof: 128 metres (420 ft)

Technical details
- Floor count: 28

Design and construction
- Architect: Sylvia Gottwald-Thapar
- Main contractor: Donolo Construction

Complexe Maisonneuve is an office building complex in Montreal, Quebec, Canada. Complexe Maisonneuve is located on Rue De la Gauchetière Ouest between Boulevard Robert-Bourassa and Colline Beaver Hall. It is situated facing Square Victoria in the Quartier international district of Downtown Montreal, and is linked to Montreal's Underground City and Square-Victoria-OACI Station on the Montreal Metro. The complex consists of two buildings, the 600 de La Gauchetière and the 1001 Robert-Bourassa which were built at the same time in 1983 but are owned by different real estate companies.

== 600 De la Gauchetière Ouest ==
600 De la Gauchetière Ouest (formally known as the Tour Banque Nationale (National Bank Tower)) is 28 stories, and 128 metres (420 ft) high. It is located at 600 Rue De la Gauchetière Ouest.

The building is home to the headquarters of the National Bank of Canada, Raymond Chabot Grant Thornton and Investissement Québec.

== 1001 Robert-Bourassa ==
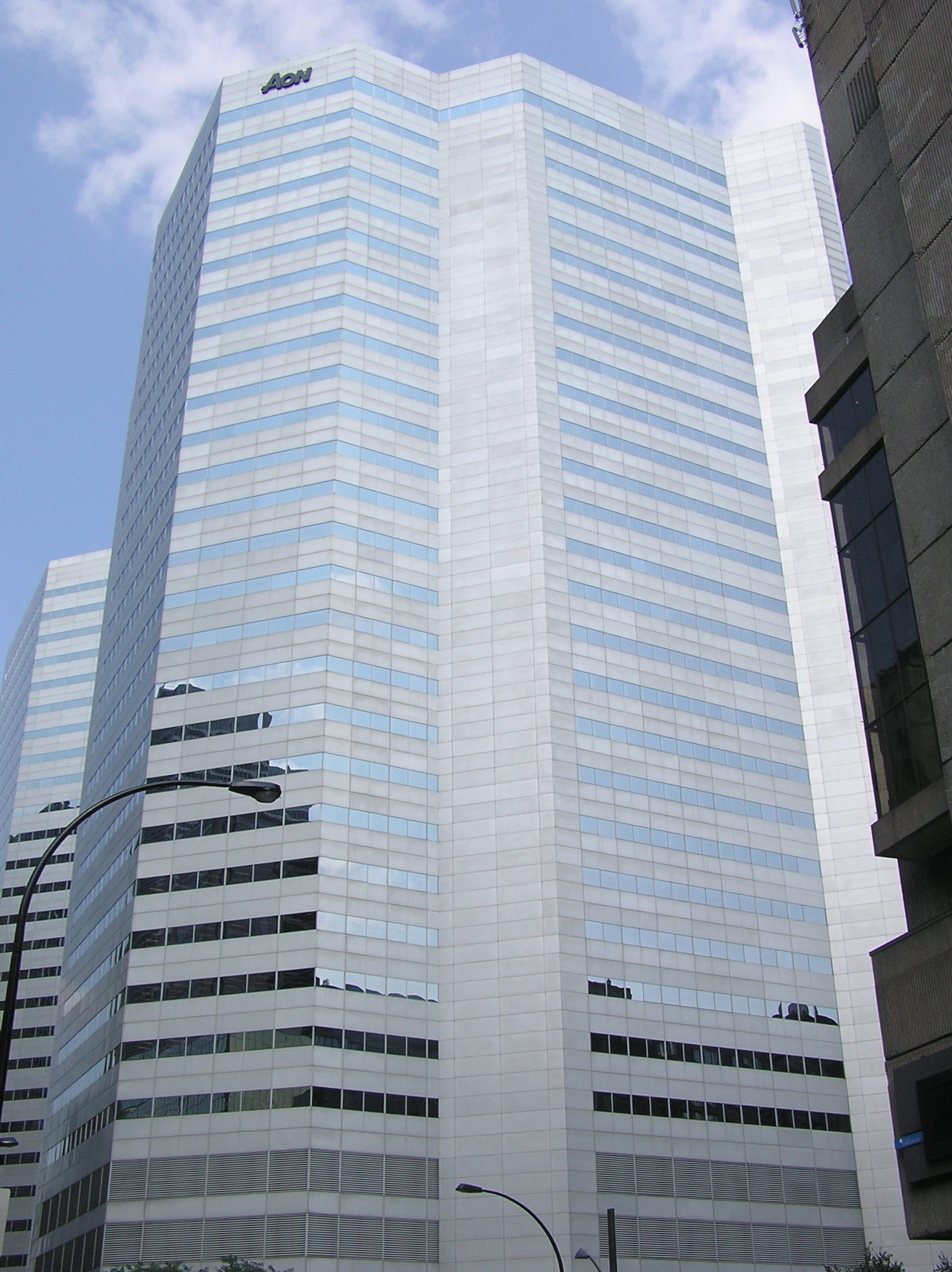
1001 Robert-Bourassa.

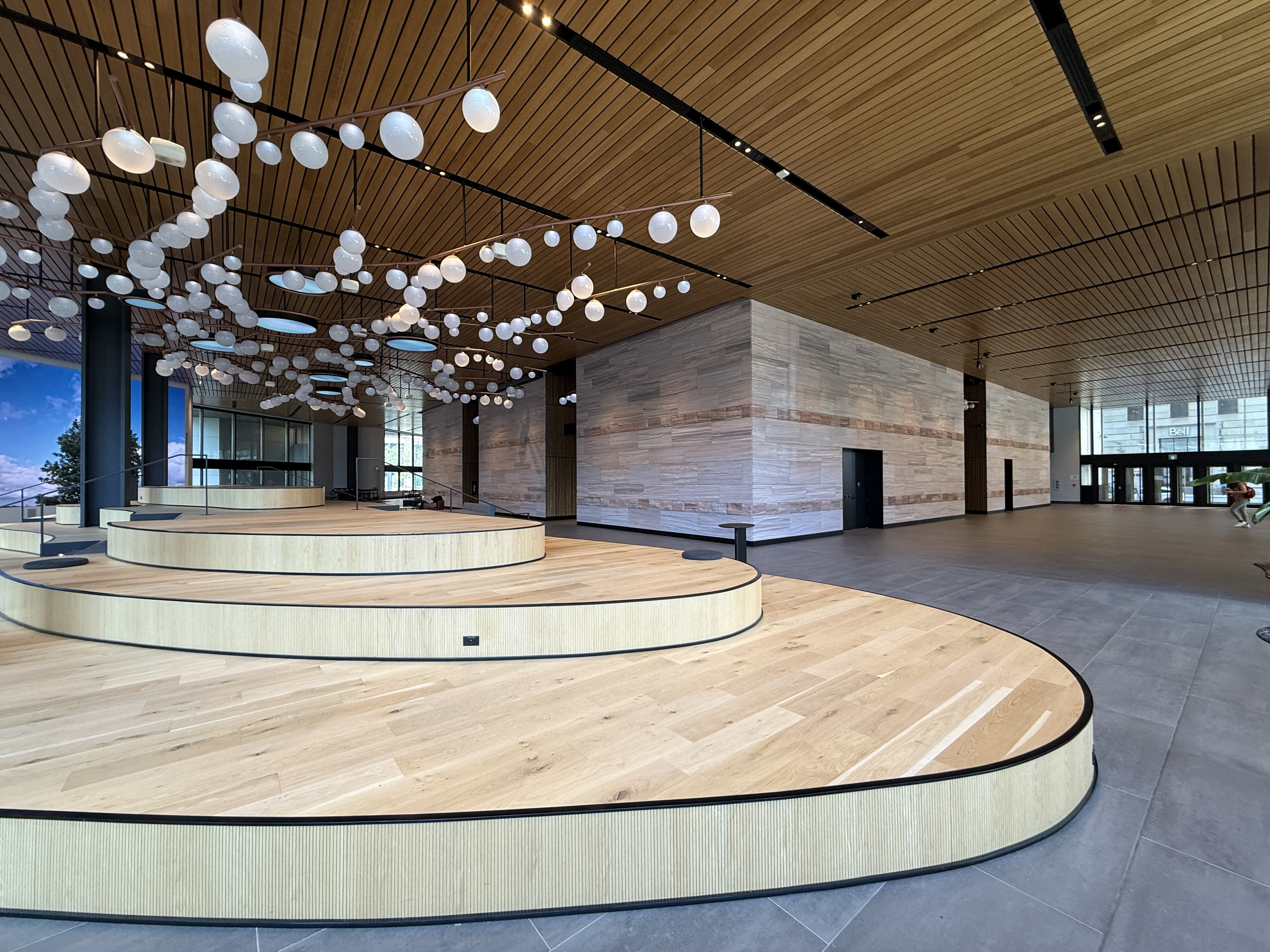
1001 Robert-Bourassa office lobby

1001 Robert-Bourassa (previously known as 700 De la Gauchetière Ouest and Tour Bell Canada) is 28 stories, and 128 metres (420 ft) high. It is located at 1001 Boulevard Robert-Bourassa and is the larger of the two buildings.

== See also ==
- List of tallest buildings in Montreal
