= National Bank of Canada =

Canadian commercial bank

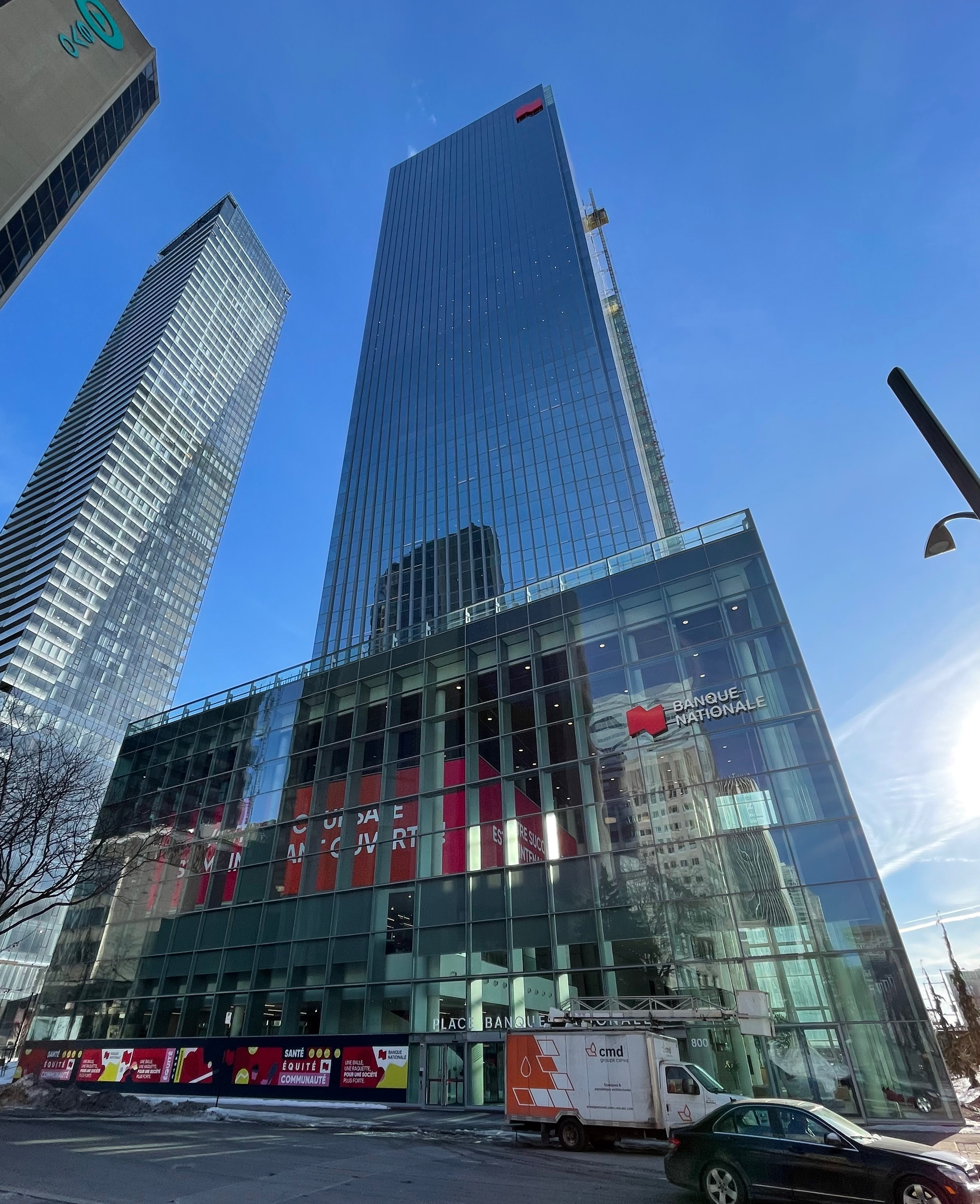
- Headquarters at 800 Saint-Jacques Street West in Montreal
- Type: Public
- Traded as: TSX: NA; S&P/TSX 60 component
- Industry: Banking; financial services
- Predecessors: Banque Canadienne Nationale; Provincial Bank of Canada
- Founded: November 1979; 47 years ago (Note: The following date was when the Banque Canadienne Nationale and the Provincial Bank of Canada merged to form the National Bank of Canada. The former institution was established in May 1859, while the latter was established in 1861.)
- Headquarters: Montreal, Quebec, Canada
- Key people: Laurent Ferreira (CEO)
- Products: Asset management; Banking; Commodities; Credit cards; Equities trading; Insurance; Investment management; Mortgage loans; Private equity; Wealth management
- Revenue: ▲CA$13.98 billion (2025)
- Net income: ▲CA$4.02 billion (2025)
- AUM: ▲CA$194.47 billion (2025)
- Total assets: ▲CA$576.92 billion (2025)
- Total equity: ▲CA$33.77 billion (2025)
- Number of employees: 33,200 (2025)
- Website: nbc.ca

The National Bank of Canada (French: Banque Nationale du Canada) is the sixth largest commercial bank in Canada. It is headquartered in Montreal, and has branches in most Canadian provinces and 3.1 million clients. National Bank is the largest bank in Quebec, and the second largest financial institution in the province after Desjardins. National Bank's institution number is 006, and the SWIFT code is BNDCCAMMINT.

== History ==
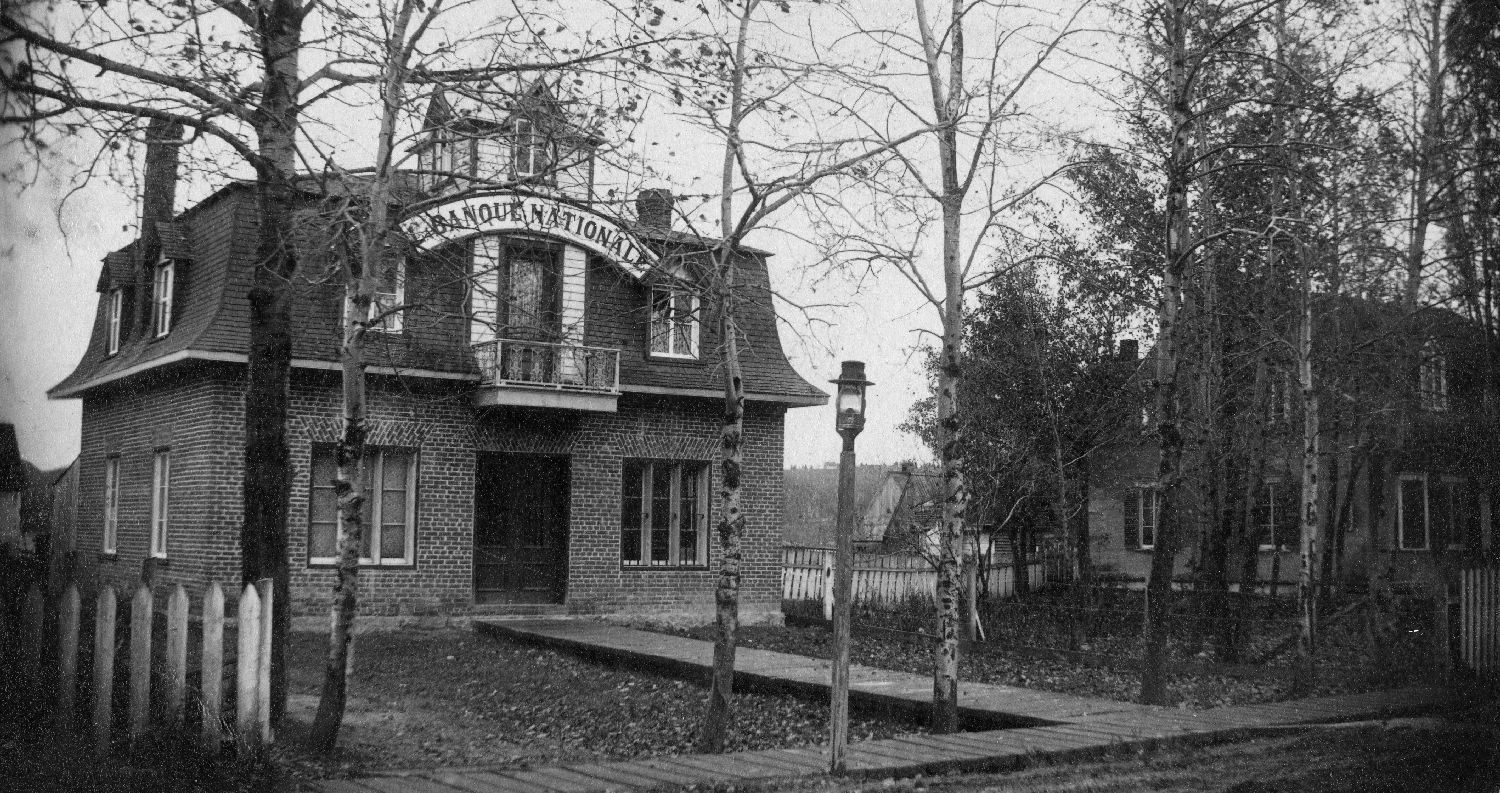
A Banque Nationale branch in Chicoutimi, 1892

In 1859, francophone businessmen in Ontario and Quebec were keen to establish a bank under their local control, and persuaded the provincial legislature to pass the act that created the Banque Nationale on May 4, 1859. Some members of the anglophone bourgeoisie participated in the bank's share capital, but francophones retained exclusive control and held all seats on the board of directors with Ulric-Joseph Tessier, lawyer and Member of the Legislative Assembly serving as chairman of the bank.

The bank suffered losses during the banking crisis sparked by the financial panic of 1873 and panic of 1884 but managed to survive and continued to operate. In the 1930s, during the Great Depression, Banque Nationale again came under financial stress; this time a merger was arranged with Banque d’Hochelaga assisted by the province's legislature to strengthen the bank. The merged bank was renamed "Banque Canadienne Nationale" (BCN) (English, "Canadian National Bank").

In 1968, BCN, in conjunction with a number of other banks, launched Chargex, the first credit card to be issued by a Canadian bank.

During the 1970s, Quebec-based rival Provincial Bank of Canada expanded rapidly through a number of acquisitions. It merged with the People's Bank in 1970, with the Toronto-based Unity Bank of Canada, and in 1979 it acquired Laurentide Financial Corporation of Vancouver. Provincial Bank and BCN continued to expand but continued to have a large part of their operations concentrated in Quebec. In November 1979, these two banks decided to merge under the new name "National Bank of Canada" in what was at the time one of the largest bank mergers.

=== Post-merger ===
Through the 1980s the bank continued to grow and expand its businesses through a number of acquisitions, including the brokerage firm Lévesque Beaubien and a year later Geoffrion Leclerc, which became known as Lévesque Beaubien Geoffrion. In 1993, it sold its lease financing operations to GE Capital and acquired the assets of General Trust of Canada.

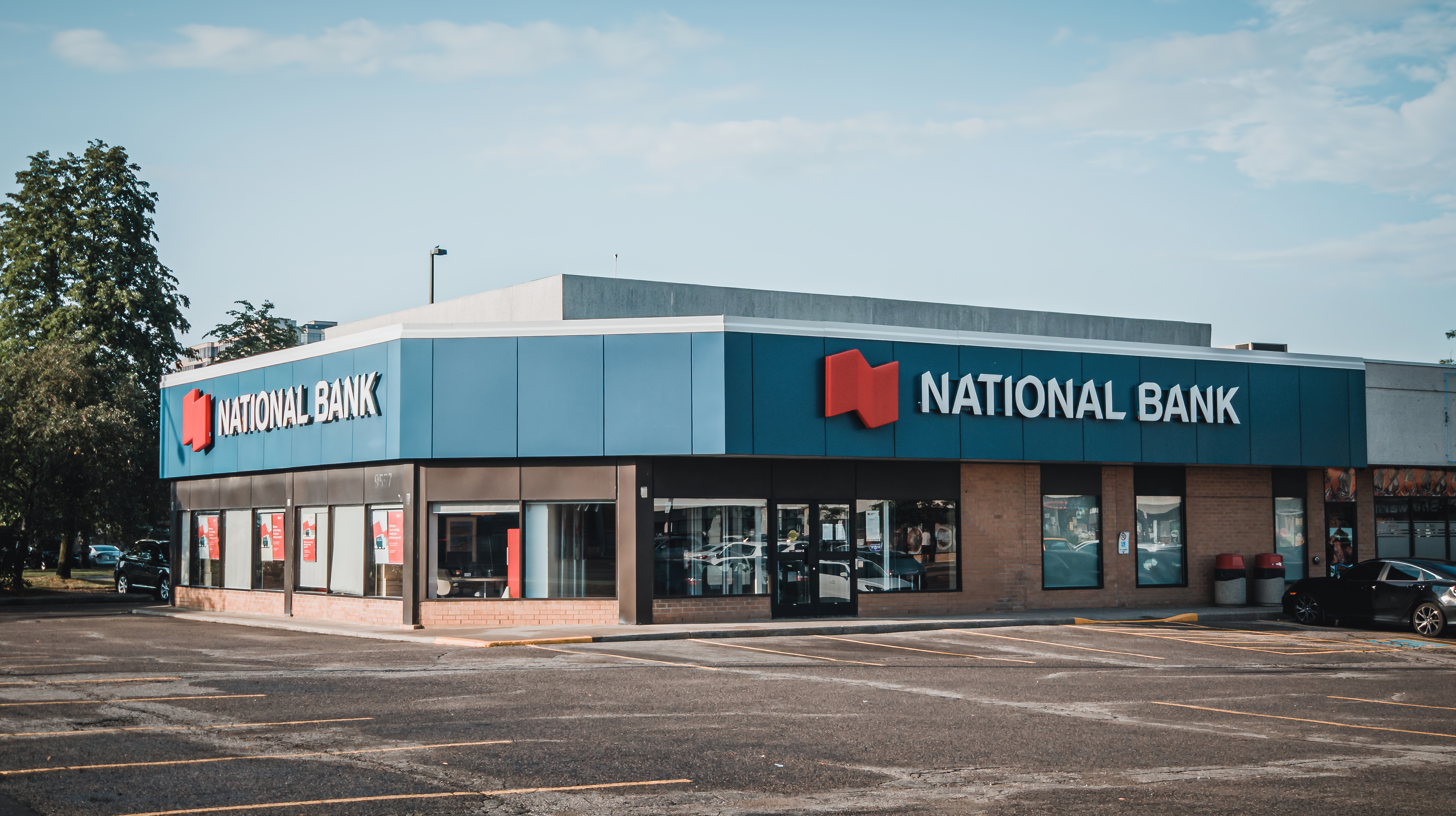
A National Bank of Canada branch in Toronto

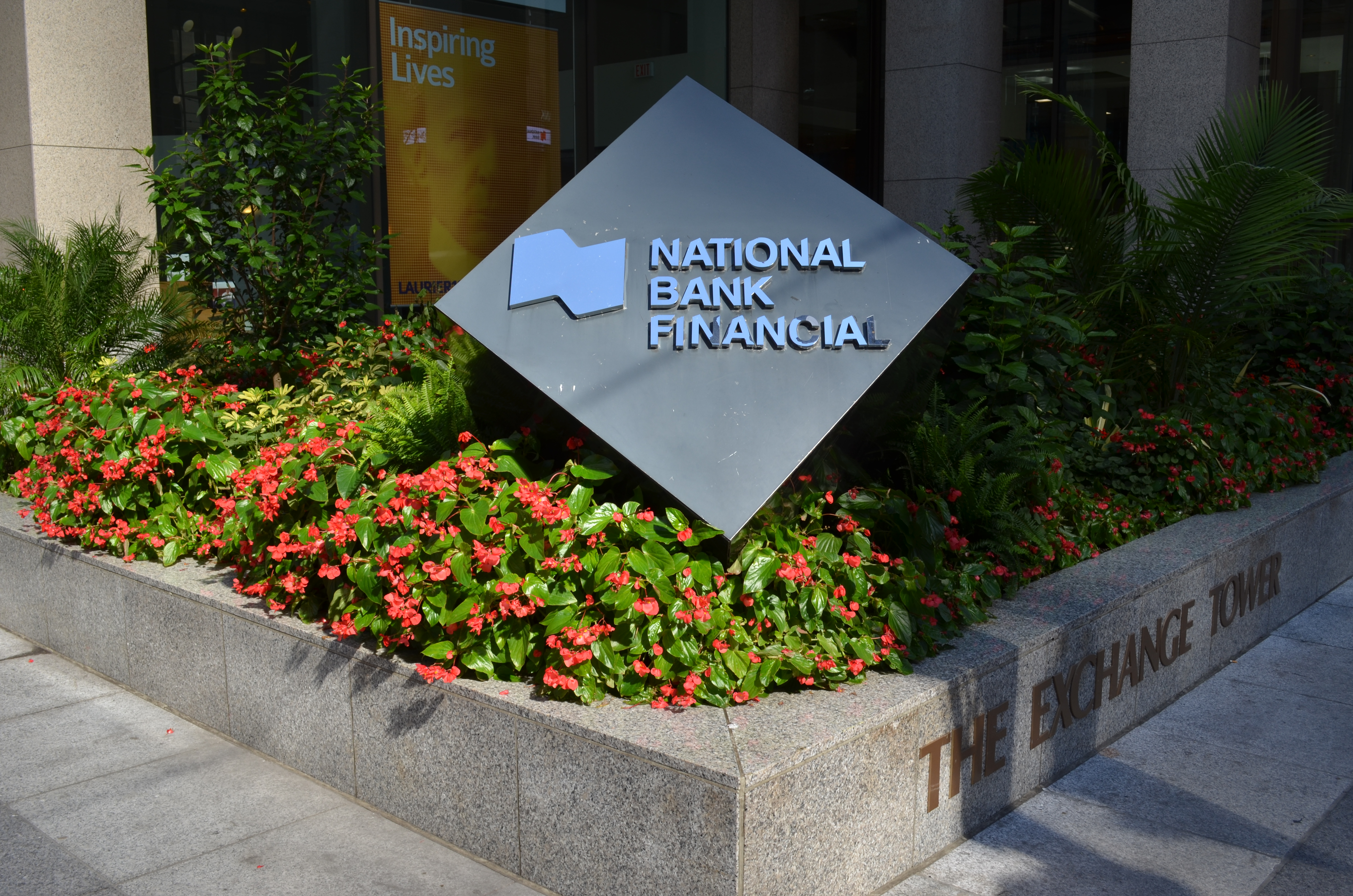
Sign outside Exchange Tower in Toronto

In 1994, it made a small step outside Canada when it opened two branches in the United States, one in Florida and one in California. As of 2020, its Natbank subsidiary has three branches, all in Florida. In 1995 the bank opened a representative office in Cuba to assist Canadian clients doing business in the country. In 1999 it concluded its purchase of First Marathon, a Toronto-based brokerage firm. First Marathon and the Bank's subsidiary Lévesque Beaubien Geoffrion Inc. merged their operations to form National Bank Financial (NBF), its investment banking subsidiary. In 2002 it acquired US-based investment bank Putnam Lovell and merged the operations with its NBF subsidiary which started operating through offices in New York, Toronto, and London.

In March 2006, it sold its shareholder management services to Computershare.

In 2016, it acquired 90 percent of the shares of ABA Bank of Cambodia (formerly known as the Advanced Bank of Asia). In 2019, it acquired the remaining 10 percent that had been held by a former head of the Kazakhstan Stock Exchange, Damir Karassayev.

In October 2019, the bank was criticized by privacy experts for requiring new online customers to provide their full login credentials for accounts with other financial institutions, including password. On its website, the bank tells clients to "Never tell anyone your password", yet during the process of creating an account, they say, "... you will need to provide... your login credentials with another eligible Canadian financial institution".

On 11 June 2024, National Bank announced plans to acquire Canadian Western Bank by the end of 2025 for $5 billion. Canadian Western shareholders voted to approve the deal on 3 September 2024, and the merger was completed in February 2025.

On December 1, 2025, the bank announced that it has acquired the retail and small-to-medium business operations of Laurentian Bank, which itself has been acquired by Fairstone Bank. The deal received regulatory approval in August 2026 and was closed on November 1, 2026. All Laurentian Bank accounts affected by the acquisition, including all personal and some business accounts, were migrated to National Bank of Canada's banking network on November 9, 2026.

== Operations ==
In August 2021, National Bank brokerage became the second Canadian financial institution to offer free online direct brokerage after Wealthsimple introduced it first.

On October 31, 2019, National Bank had a network of 422 branches and 939 automated teller machines in Canada. It also had a representative offices, subsidiaries and partnerships in other countries, through which it serves Canadian and non-Canadian clients. It owns ABA Bank in Cambodia.

National Bank's business is concentrated in Quebec, and it is expanding in other provinces. For the year ending October 31, 2017, 59% of its total revenues were from Quebec, 30% from other provinces, and 11% from its international operations. Its total revenue for the year were allocated across the following business segments:

- 44.8% from Personal and Commercial Banking,
- 23.5% from Wealth Management,
- 23.8% from Financial Markets, and
- 7.9% from U.S. Specialty Finance and International.

In 2011, National Bank was placed third in Bloomberg's list of "The World’s Strongest Banks". In 2018, it placed 41st on Go back Finance's list of the 50 strongest banks.

== Leadership ==
=== President ===
1. Michel Bélanger, 1 November 1979 – 30 June 1984
2. Gilles Mercure, 1 July 1984 – 31 March 1986
3. André Bérard, 1 April 1986 – 5 July 2001
4. Léon Courville, 1993–1999
5. Réal Raymond, 5 July 2001 – 31 May 2007
6. Louis Vachon, 1 June 2007 – 31 October 2021
7. Laurent Ferreira, 1 November 2021 – present

=== Chairman of the Board ===
1. Germain Perreault, 1 November 1979 – 30 June 1981
2. Michel Bélanger, 1 July 1981 – 28 September 1990
3. André Bérard, 28 September 1990 – 10 March 2004
4. Jean-Eudes Douville, 10 March 2004 – 10 April 2014
5. Jean Houde, 10 April 2014 – 21 April 2023
6. Robert Paré, 21 April 2023 – present

== See also ==
- Big Five (banks)
- List of banks and credit unions in Canada
- List of banks in the Americas
