= Unity Bank of Canada =

Defunct Canadian bank

- Industry: Finance
- Founded: 1972
- Defunct: 1978
- Fate: Merged into Provincial Bank of Canada/Banque provinciale du Canada
- Headquarters: Toronto, Ontario, Canada

The Unity Bank of Canada was a small Canadian bank that was established in Toronto, Ontario, in 1972. Richard Higgins was president and David Matthews was general manager. It amalgamated with the Provincial Bank of Canada on February 14, 1977.

By September 1975, the bank had 23 branches in Quebec, Ontario, British Columbia and Alberta.

In 1977, the Unity Bank experienced problem loans, and large creditors withdrew funds when they became aware of the bank's financial problems. The Bank of Canada advanced funds to provide liquidity support over a three-month period. Historically, very few chartered banks in Canada have experienced liquidity crises.

Journalist Walter Stewart alluded to Unity Bank's troubled history in a 1983 speech to the Empire Club:

In our own day, the Unity Bank of Canada flowered and withered in the early 1970s under the direction of one Richard Higgins, a man who was a) very charming, b) very smart, and c) very crooked. He eventually wound up in jail, and almost nothing about what really happened ever appeared in Canadian newspapers.

— Walter Stewart

== See also ==
- List of Canadian banks
