= Icône =

Icône Condominiums
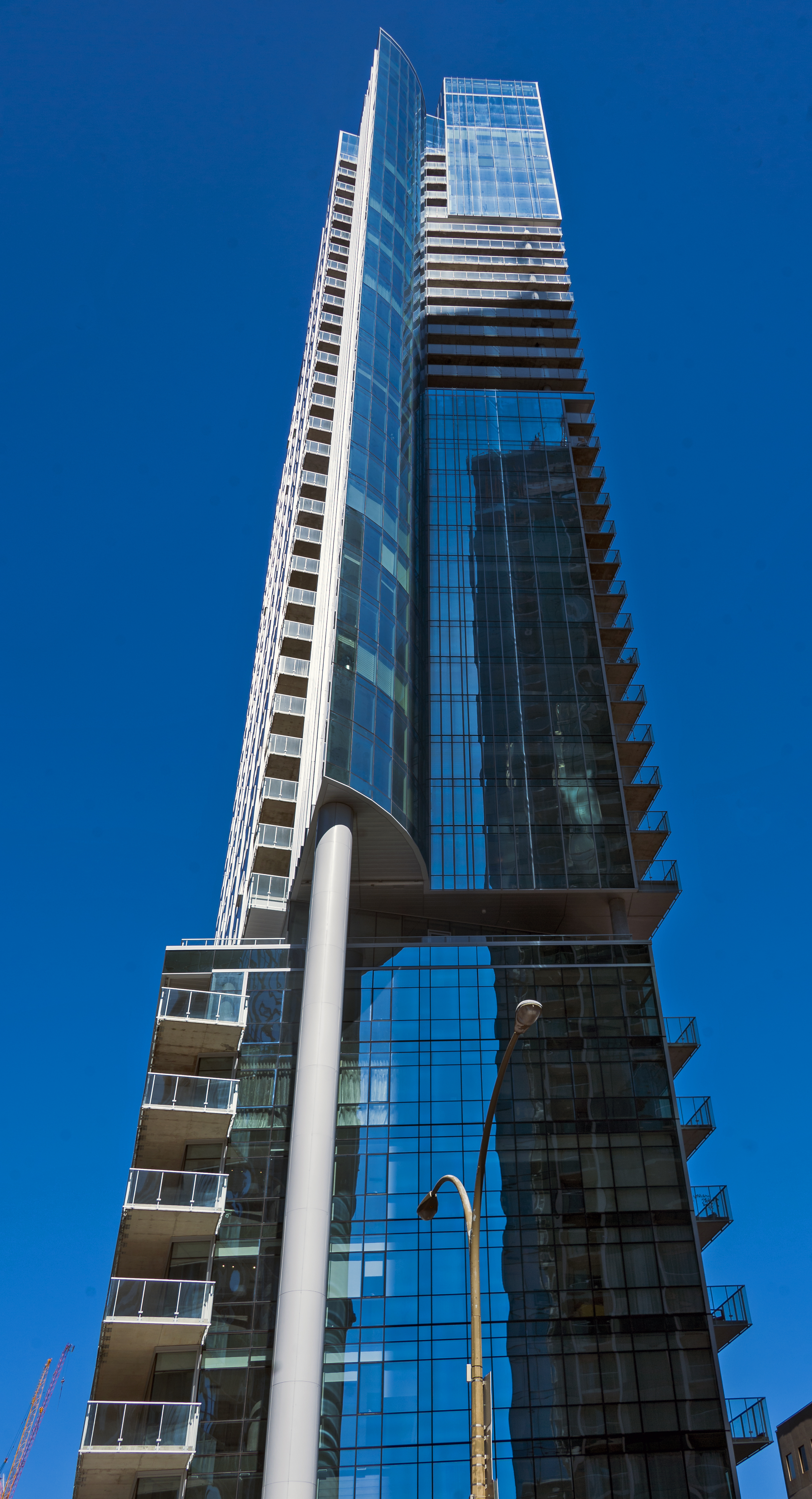
- Icône in 2017

- Location within Montreal

General information
- Status: Completed
- Type: Condominiums, office space
- Location: Montreal, Quebec, Canada
- Coordinates: 45.497113°N 73.572568°W
- Construction started: 2013
- Completed: 2016
- Cost: C$120 million

Height
- Height: 146 metres (479 ft)

Technical details
- Floor count: 39

Design and construction
- Architecture firm: Béïque Legault Thuot

Website
- iconecondos.com

Icône is a skyscraper complex in Montreal, Quebec, Canada designed by the architecture firm Béïque Legault Thuot. The towers are located on René-Lévesque Boulevard at the corner of De la Montagne Street, near the Bell Centre and facing the Roccabella development.

The West Tower has 39 floors and is 146 metres (479 ft) tall, while the East Tower has 27 floors and is 107 metres (351 ft) tall. The promoter of the project is Metropolitan Parking Inc.

The West Tower consists of 358 luxury condos. The East Tower, meanwhile, is mixed-use, containing office space and rental apartment units.

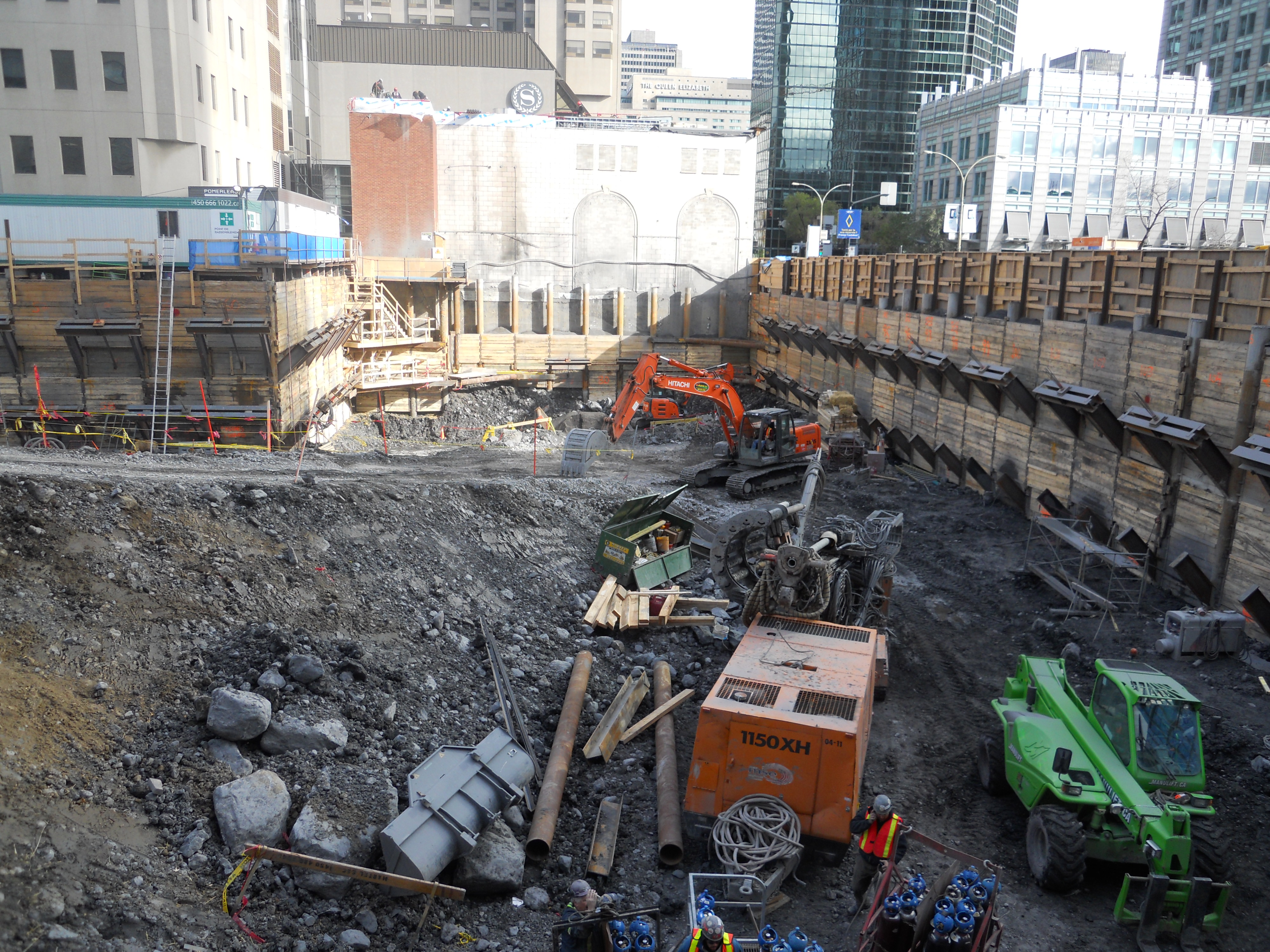
Construction site in October 2013

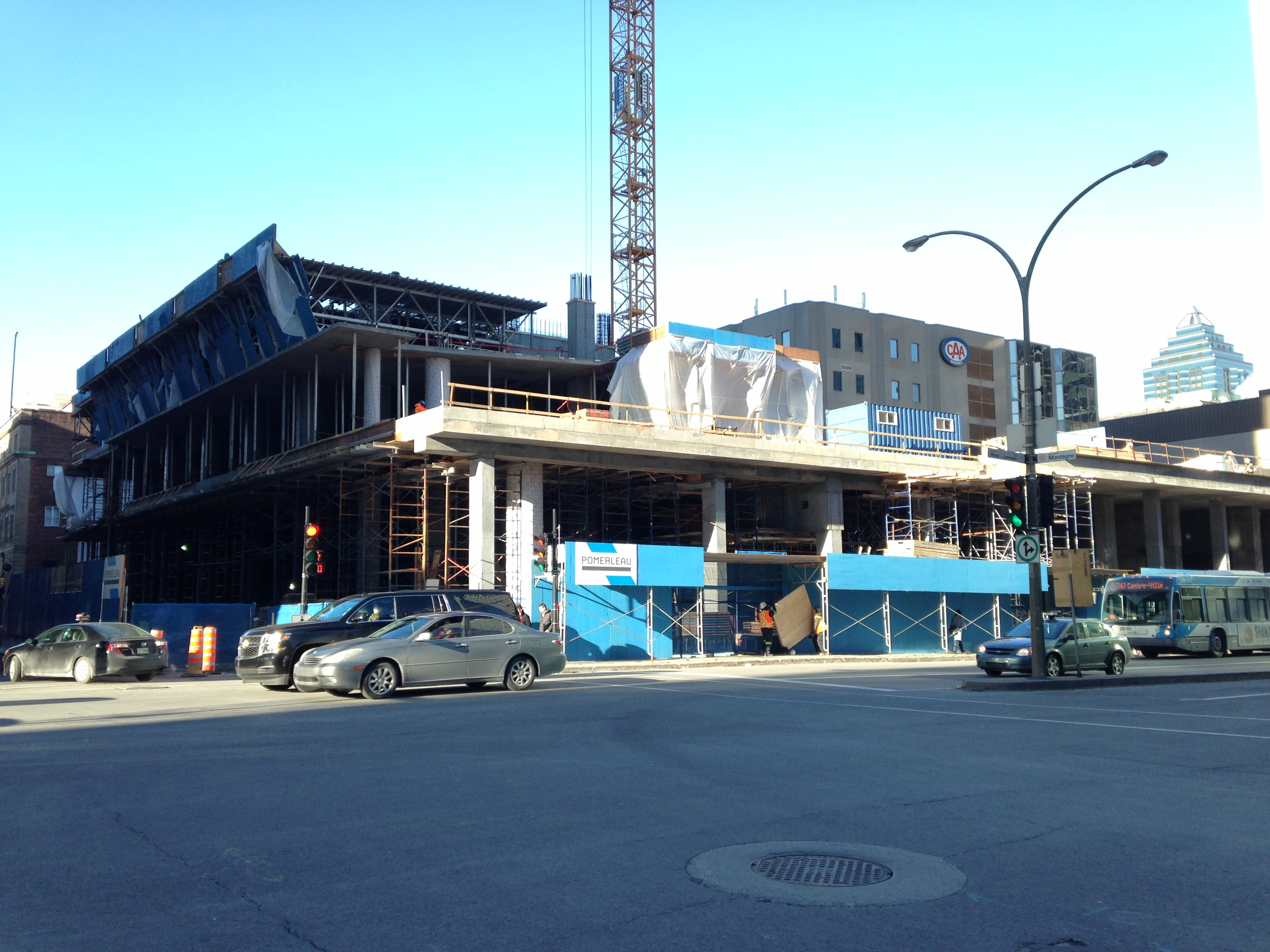
Construction site in December 2014

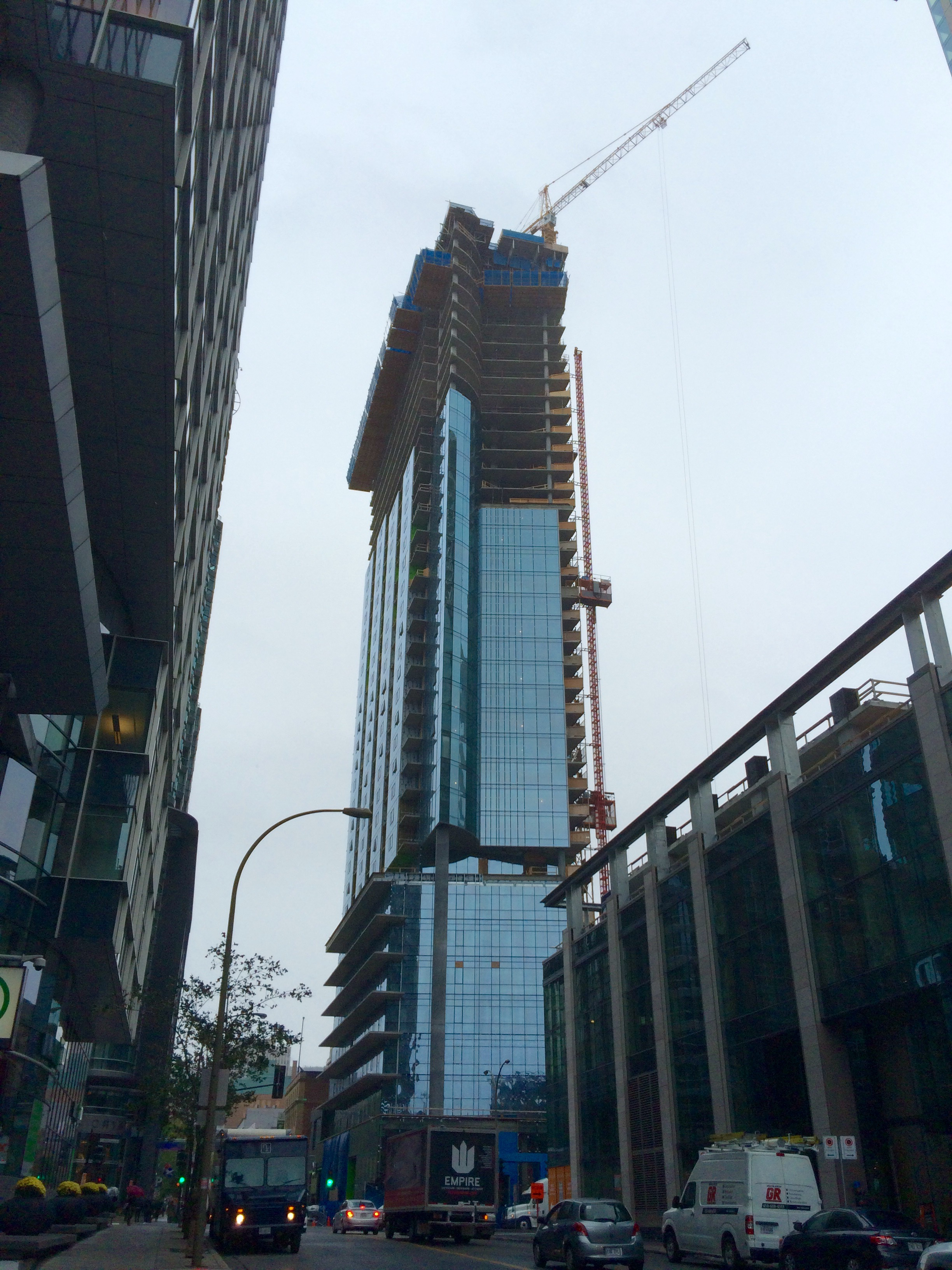
Construction site in September 2015

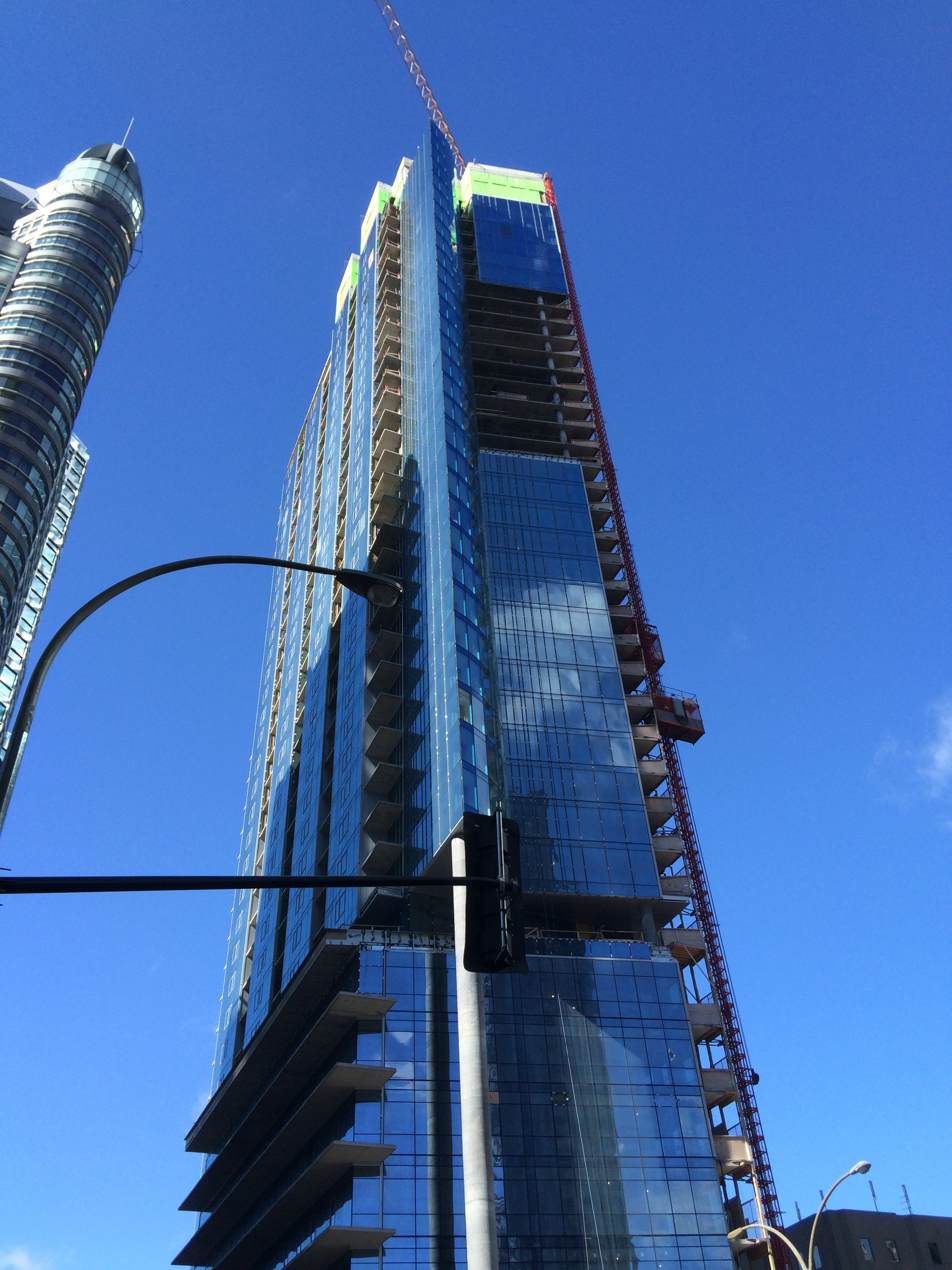
Construction site in March 2016
