= TestGrid =

American software testing company

- Industry: Software testing
- Founded: 2015; 11 years ago
- Founder: Harry Rao
- Headquarters: Atlanta, Georgia, United States
- Key people: Harry Rao (CEO)
- Website: testgrid.io

TestGrid is an American software testing company with its headquarters in Atlanta, Georgia. It develops a platform for testing websites and mobile applications on different browsers, operating systems and devices, which can run in the cloud or on a customer's own servers. It was founded by Harry Rao, its chief executive. The company was self-funded until 2023, and since 2024 it has also developed AI-based testing tools.

== History ==
The company was founded in 2015. Its first product, a scriptless test automation tool, was built in 2016. Rao had previously worked at CGI and The Walt Disney Company. He moved from California to Atlanta to reduce costs, and TestGrid was initially based at the Atlanta Tech Village. It has offices and delivery teams in India.

Over the following five years, the product grew into a broader testing platform, and the company held a formal launch in September 2022, when it was still self-funded.

In August 2023, TestGrid raised its first outside investment, a Pre-Series A round from an investment firm.

TestGrid released CoTester, an AI-based testing tool, in April 2024. A second version, CoTester 2.0, followed, and in 2025 the company extended the tool to enterprise software including ServiceNow, Salesforce and SAP.

In November 2026, the company introduced TestGrid ONE, a successor to its TestOS platform. The platform incorporated the company's existing testing infrastructure and AI-based tools, including CoTester.

== Products ==
TestGrid's platform began with low-code test automation and access to physical devices, and later added API and performance testing, visual validation and test management. It runs tests of websites and mobile applications across combinations of devices and browsers, and includes integration and security testing.

CoTester is designed to generate test scripts from written requirements such as Jira user stories and to adjust tests automatically when an application's interface changes, which CoTester 2.0 does through a component called AgentRx.
