= Archibald Macintyre =

Archibald Macintyre may refer to:

- Archibald T. MacIntyre (1822–1900), American politician and lawyer
- Archibald James Macintyre (1908–1967), British-born mathematician

== See also ==
- Archibald McIntyre (disambiguation)
