= Archibald McIntyre (disambiguation) =

Archibald McIntyre may refer to:

- Archibald McIntyre, American merchant and politician
- Archibald McIntyre (carpenter), Canadian carpenter
- Archibald McIntyre Campbell, politician from Manitoba

== See also ==
- Archibald Macintyre (disambiguation)
