= E-Commerce Place =

E-Commerce Place Cité du commerce électronique
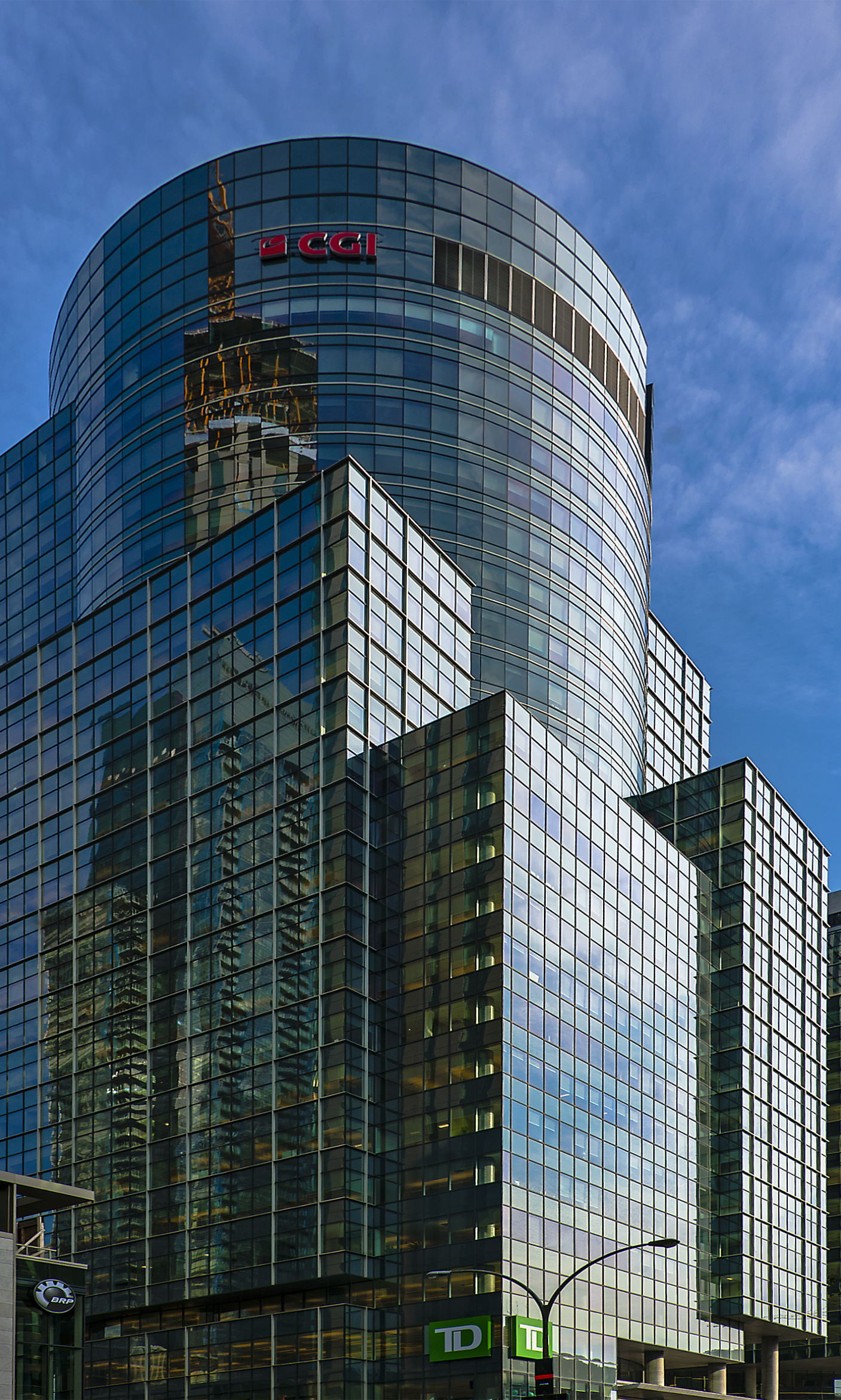
- View from north, 2017

- Location within Montreal

General information
- Status: Completed
- Type: Office
- Architectural style: Modern
- Location: 1350 René Lévesque Boulevard, Montreal, Quebec, Canada
- Coordinates: 45.4959°N 73.5722°W
- Construction started: 2001
- Completed: 2004

Height
- Roof: 119 metres (390 ft)

Technical details
- Floor count: 27

Design and construction
- Architect: Béïque Legault Thuot

E-Commerce Place (French: Cité du commerce électronique) (CCE) is an office complex of two towers located in Montreal, Quebec, Canada. It is located on René-Lévesque Boulevard West between Mountain Street and Lucien L'Allier Street in Downtown Montreal.

It derives its name from the fact that its construction was part of a program grant from the Government of Quebec to promote the development of employment in the field of information technology. The complex provided incentives to firms specializing in electronic commerce.

== History ==
The Parti Québécois government launched the Cité du Multimédia in June 1998, which was seen as a relative success of job creation despite the progressive scaling down of the program. In its wake, the government launched the E-Commerce in May 2000.

These projects upset members of Montreal's real-estate community and some high-tech entrepreneurs because it forced companies to relocate to E-Commerce Place and Cité Multimédia in order to receive tax assistance.

Both programs have also been criticized for promoting the construction of buildings rather than the subsidization of employment and, as a result, moving around existing jobs instead of creating new ones.

The grant program was cancelled in 2003 following the election of the Quebec Liberal Party. This led to the cancellation of three other planned phases of the E-Commerce Place complex.

== Architecture ==
The first tower, located at 1350 René-Lévesque Boulevard West (corner Mountain Street), has 27 floors and was completed in early 2003. Its primary tenant is CGI Inc., an information technology consulting firm.

The second phase tower located at 1360 René Lévesque (corner Lucien L'Allier Street), has 17 floors and was completed in spring 2004. Tenants in the second tower include Fairstone Bank of Canada, which was formally occupied by Laurentian Bank of Canada until 2026.

Between the two towers is a glass-enclosed common area with a convenience store and various fast food restaurants.

The building's architects were Béïque Legault Thuot.

== Gallery ==
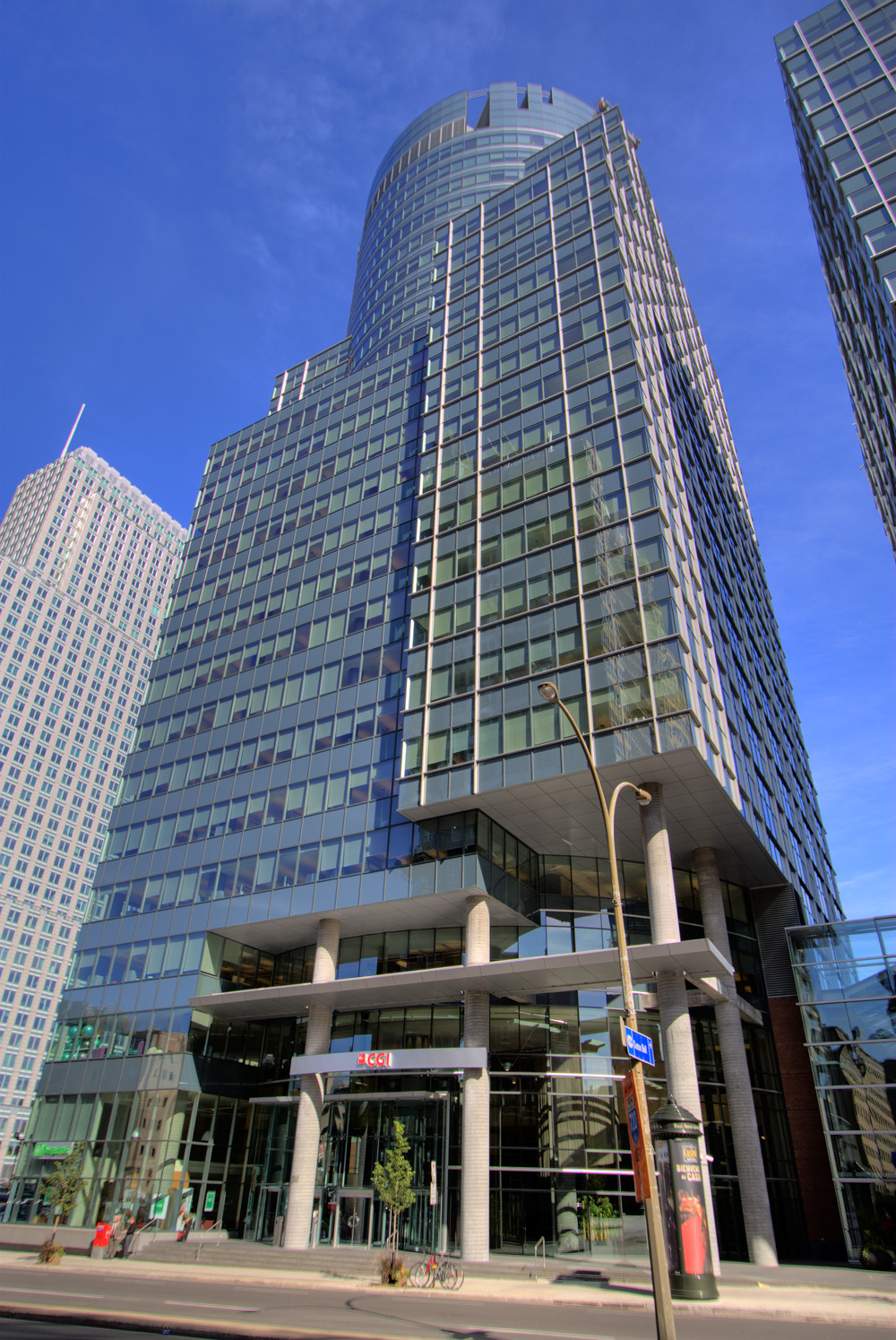
E-Commerce Place, Phase I.

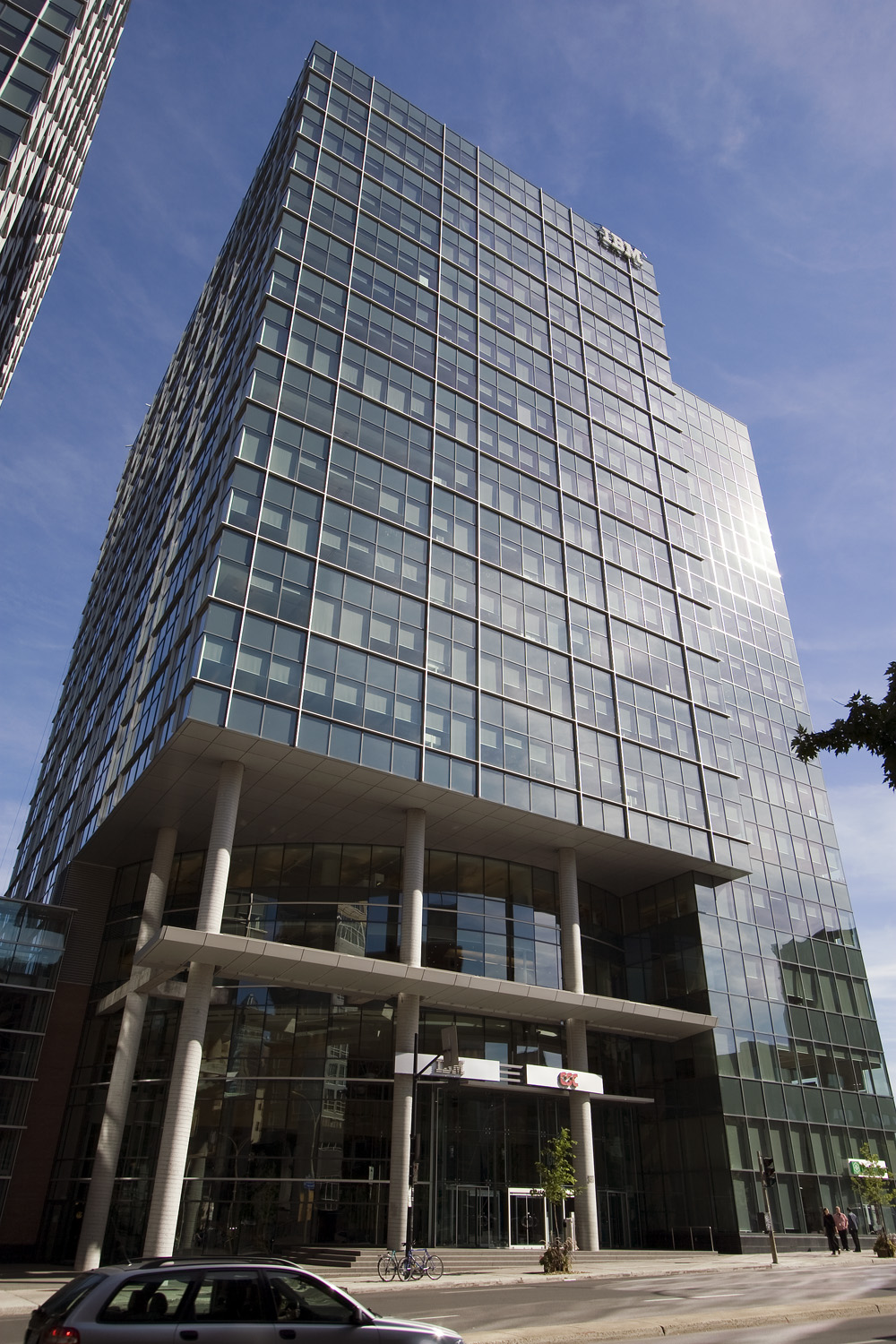
E-Commerce Place, Phase II.
