= Archibald McIntyre (carpenter) =

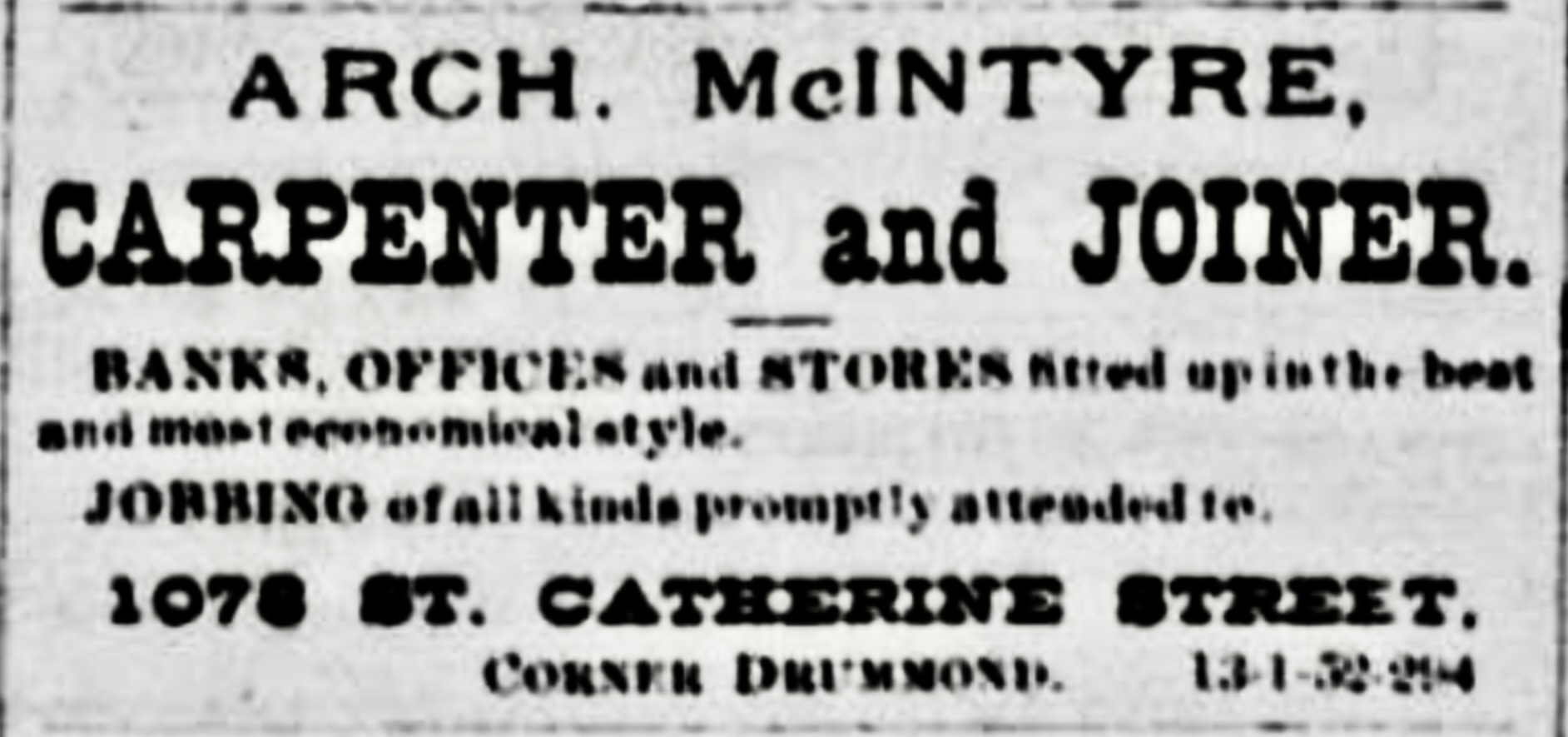
- Born: August 23, 1835; Comrie, Scotland
- Died: October 22, 1899; Montreal, Canada
- Resting place: Mount Royal Cemetery

Archibald McIntyre (born August 23, 1835 in Comrie, Scotland and died October 22, 1899 in Montreal, Canada) was a Canadian carpenter, joiner, cabinetmaker, plasterer and businessman of British origin.

== Biography ==
Archibald McIntyre was born on August 23, 1835, in Comrie, Scotland. He emigrated to Canada around 1862, and worked thereafter as a carpenter and joiner. Around 1870, he opened a workshop at the corner of Sainte-Catherine and Drummond streets and advertised himself as a general contractor. (Note: Mackay 1859–1870, p. 253 (Montreal Directory), Year 1869-70) (Note: Mackay 1859–1870, p. 353 (Montreal Directory), Year 1870-71) He employed dozens of carpenters, joiners, and cabinetmakers. Archibald McIntyre died on October 22, 1899, in Montreal, Canada. His funeral was held on October 24, 1899, at his residence at 132 Mackay Street in Montreal. He was buried in Mount Royal Cemetery.

=== Personal life ===
On June 26, 1877, Archibald McIntyre married Margareth Jones Morice. He had eight children: one son, Archibald Jr., and seven daughters, including Mary Appleyard, Catherine, Ellen, Ethel, and Janet. (Note: Mackay 1859–1870, p. 608 (Montreal Directory), Year 1890-91) His wife died on March 12, 1899, in Pasadena, California, at the age of 44.

== List of works ==
Below is a non-exhaustive list of known achievements of Archibald McIntyre or his company:

Year	Work	Building	Location	Illustration
1869-70	Carpentry and other wood works	Wesleyan Church	Corner of Des Seigneurs and St. Joseph Streets, Montreal, Quebec, Canada	
1875-1878	Carpentry and other wood works	Montreal City Hall	Notre-Dame Street, Montreal, Quebec, Canada	
1878-1879	Carpentry and other wood works	St. Gabriel Wesleyan Church	Saint Catherine Street (between Phillips Square St. Alexander Street), Montreal, Quebec, Canada	
1879-1880	Carpentry and other wood works	Olivet Baptist Church	Corner of Osborne and de la Montagne Streets, Montreal, Quebec, Canada	
1881-1883	All wood works (including carpentry and all wood decorations inside)	George Stephen House	Drummond Street, Montreal, Quebec, Canada	
1885-1886	Carpentry and other wood works	Balmoral Hotel	Notre-Dame Street, Montreal, Quebec, Canada	
1886-1887	Carpentry and other wood works	Windsor Station	Osborne Street, Montreal, Quebec, Canada	
1891-1892	Carpentry and other wood works	High School of Montreal	Peel Streel, Montreal, Quebec, Canada	

== Sources ==
=== Books / Works ===
- Mackay, Robert W. S., ed. (1859–1870). The Montreal Directory. Montreal, Quebec: John Lovell.

=== Newspaper Articles ===
List of newspaper articles in chronological order of publication:

- "A great sawing match". Morning chronicle and commercial and shipping gazette (Newspaper). Vol. 16, no. 6043 (Charles St. Michel,1850-1888 ed.). Montreal (QC), Canada. February 25, 1862. p. 2.
- "Passengers". Morning chronicle and commercial and shipping gazette (Newspaper). Vol. 21, no. 8642 (Charles St. Michel,1850-1888 ed.). Montreal (QC), Canada. November 6, 1867. p. 2.
- "Archibald McIntyre". The Daily Witness (Newspaper). Vol. 9, no. 126 (John Dougall ed.). Montreal (QC), Canada. May 28, 1868. p. 4.
- "Laying the Fondation Stone of a new Wesleyan Church". Montreal Herald and Daily Commercial Gazette (Newspaper). Vol. 61, no. 224 (Robert Weir ed.). Montreal (QC), Canada. September 20, 1869. p. 2.
- "2nd Edition. Four O'Clock. The Loss of the Steamer "Robert Lowe". Heroic conduct of the Captain". The Evening Star (Newspaper). Vol. 5, no. 276 ([The evening star],1869-1877 ed.). Montreal (QC), Canada. November 24, 1873. p. 3.
- "The New City Hall". Montreal Herald and Daily Commercial Gazette (Newspaper). Vol. 67, no. 136 (Robert Weir ed.). Montreal (QC), Canada. June 9, 1875. p. 4.
- "New City Hall". The Daily Witness (Newspaper). Vol. 14, no. 134 (John Dougall ed.). Montreal (QC), Canada. June 9, 1875. p. 2.
- "The City Hall Committee". The Evening Star (Newspaper). Vol. 7, no. 141 ([The evening star],1869-1877 ed.). Montreal (QC), Canada. June 16, 1875. p. 3.
- "The Roofing of new City Hall". The Daily Witness (Newspaper). Vol. 15, no. 189 (John Dougall ed.). Montreal (QC), Canada. August 12, 1876. p. 3.
- "Arch. McIntyre, Carpenter and Joiner. (Ad.)". Canadian illustrated News (Newspaper). Vol. 14, no. 15 (Montréal : Geo. E. Desbarats, 1869-1883 ed.). Montreal (QC), Canada. October 21, 1876. p. 15.
- "Marriages. McIntyre - Morice". The Star (Newspaper). Vol. 14, no. 15 (Montréal : [éditeur non identifié], 1877-1880 ed.). Montreal (QC), Canada. June 27, 1877. p. 3.
- "Olivet Baptist Church". The Daily Witness (Newspaper). Vol. 17, no. 97 (John Dougall ed.). Montreal (QC), Canada. April 25, 1878. p. 1.
- "Olivet Baptist Church". Montreal Herald and Daily Commercial Gazette (Newspaper). Vol. 70, no. 99 (Robert Weir ed.). Montreal (QC), Canada. April 26, 1878. p. 2.
- "Wesley Congregational Church. Laying of the corner stone". Montreal Herald and Daily Commercial Gazette (Newspaper). Vol. 70, no. 171 (Robert Weir ed.). Montreal (QC), Canada. July 19, 1878. p. 4.
- "The New Baptist Church". The Daily Witness (Newspaper). Vol. 18, no. 69 (John Dougall ed.). Montreal (QC), Canada. March 22, 1879. p. 8.
- "Olivet Baptist Church. The Dedication Yesterday". Montreal Herald and Daily Commercial Gazette (Newspaper). Vol. 71, no. 70 (Robert Weir ed.). Montreal (QC), Canada. March 24, 1879. p. 4.
- "Cabmen's Shelter". The Star (Newspaper). Vol. 11, no. 291 (Montréal : [éditeur non identifié], 1877-1880 ed.). Montreal (QC), Canada. December 10, 1879. p. 3.
- "Wanted at A. McIntyre. (Ad.)". The Daily Witness (Newspaper). Vol. 21, no. 168 (John Dougall ed.). Montreal (QC), Canada. July 21, 1882. p. 6.
- "A Deliberate Robbery". The Canadian Gleaner (Newspaper) (Canadian gleaner], 1863-1912 ed.). Huntingdon (QC), Canada. August 31, 1882. p. 1.
- "Protestant Board of School Commissioners". The Daily Witness (Newspaper). Vol. 22, no. 168 (John Dougall ed.). Montreal (QC), Canada. July 19, 1883. p. 1.
- "Mr. George Stephen's Montreal Mansion". The Daily Witness (Newspaper). Vol. 23, no. 57 (John Dougall ed.). Montreal (QC), Canada. March 8, 1884. p. 5.
- "Eligible Lot of Land for Sale. (Ad.)". Montreal Herald and Daily Commercial Gazette (Newspaper). Vol. 76, no. 261 (Robert Weir ed.). Montreal (QC), Canada. October 30, 1884. p. 1.
- "First Annual Dinner of the Provincial Association at the Balmoral Hotel Last Evening. Formal Opening of the House with Great Eclat". Montreal Herald and Daily Commercial Gazette (Newspaper). Vol. 78, no. 127 (Robert Weir ed.). Montreal (QC), Canada. May 27, 1886. p. 8.
- "The McIntyre Palace". The Daily Witness (Newspaper). Vol. 30, no. 96 (John Dougall ed.). Montreal (QC), Canada. April 24, 1889. p. 6.
- "High School Tenders Accepted $185,000". The Montreal Herald (Newspaper). Vol. 84, no. 94 (The Herald Publishing Company,1899-1914 ed.). Montreal (QC), Canada. April 20, 1891. p. 8.
- "Educational Courses in the Boy's Department". The Daily Witness (Newspaper). Vol. 32, no. 204 (John Dougall ed.). Montreal (QC), Canada. August 31, 1891. p. 3.
- "Marriages. Wylie-McIntyre". The Montreal Daily Star (Newspaper). Vol. 86, no. 162 (Montreal daily star], 1881-1951 ed.). Montreal (QC), Canada. July 8, 1893. p. 3.
- "Deaths. McIntyre. (Margaret J. Morice)". The Daily Witness (Newspaper). Vol. 40, no. 61 (John Dougall ed.). Montreal (QC), Canada. March 14, 1899. p. 2.
- "Mr. A. McIntyre Dead". The Montreal Daily Star (Newspaper). Vol. 31, no. 249 (Montreal daily star], 1881-1951 ed.). Montreal (QC), Canada. October 23, 1899. p. 9.
- "Deaths. McIntyre". The Herald (Newspaper). Vol. 92, no. 251 (The Herald Publishing Company,1896-1899 ed.). Montreal (QC), Canada. October 24, 1891. p. 8.
- "Mr. Arch. McIntyre's Funeral". The Herald (Newspaper). Vol. 92, no. 252 (The Herald Publishing Company,1896-1899 ed.). Montreal (QC), Canada. October 25, 1891. p. 10.
- "Mr. A. McIntyre's Funeral". The Montreal Daily Star (Newspaper). Vol. 31, no. 251 (Montreal daily star], 1881-1951 ed.). Montreal (QC), Canada. October 25, 1899. p. 3.
- "DThe Archibald McIntyre Estate". The Daily Witness (Newspaper). Vol. 41, no. 209 (John Dougall ed.). Montreal (QC), Canada. September 6, 1900. p. 3.
