= Sheila Scott Macintyre =

Scottish mathematician

Sheila Scott Macintyre FRSE
- Born: Sheila Scott; 23 April 1910; Edinburgh, Scotland
- Died: 21 March 1960 (aged 49); Cincinnati, Ohio, US
- Education: Edinburgh Ladies' College; University of Edinburgh; Girton College, Cambridge
- Known for: work on the Whittaker function
- Spouse: Archibald James Macintyre (m. 1940)
- Scientific career
- Fields: mathematics
- Workplaces: University of Aberdeen; University of Cincinnati
- Thesis: Some Problems in Interpolatory Function Theory (1947)
- Doctoral advisor: Edward Maitland Wright

Sheila Scott Macintyre FRSE (23 April 1910 – 21 March 1960) was a Scottish mathematician best known for her work on the Whittaker constant. Macintyre is also known for co-authoring a German–English mathematics dictionary with Edith Witte.

== Education ==
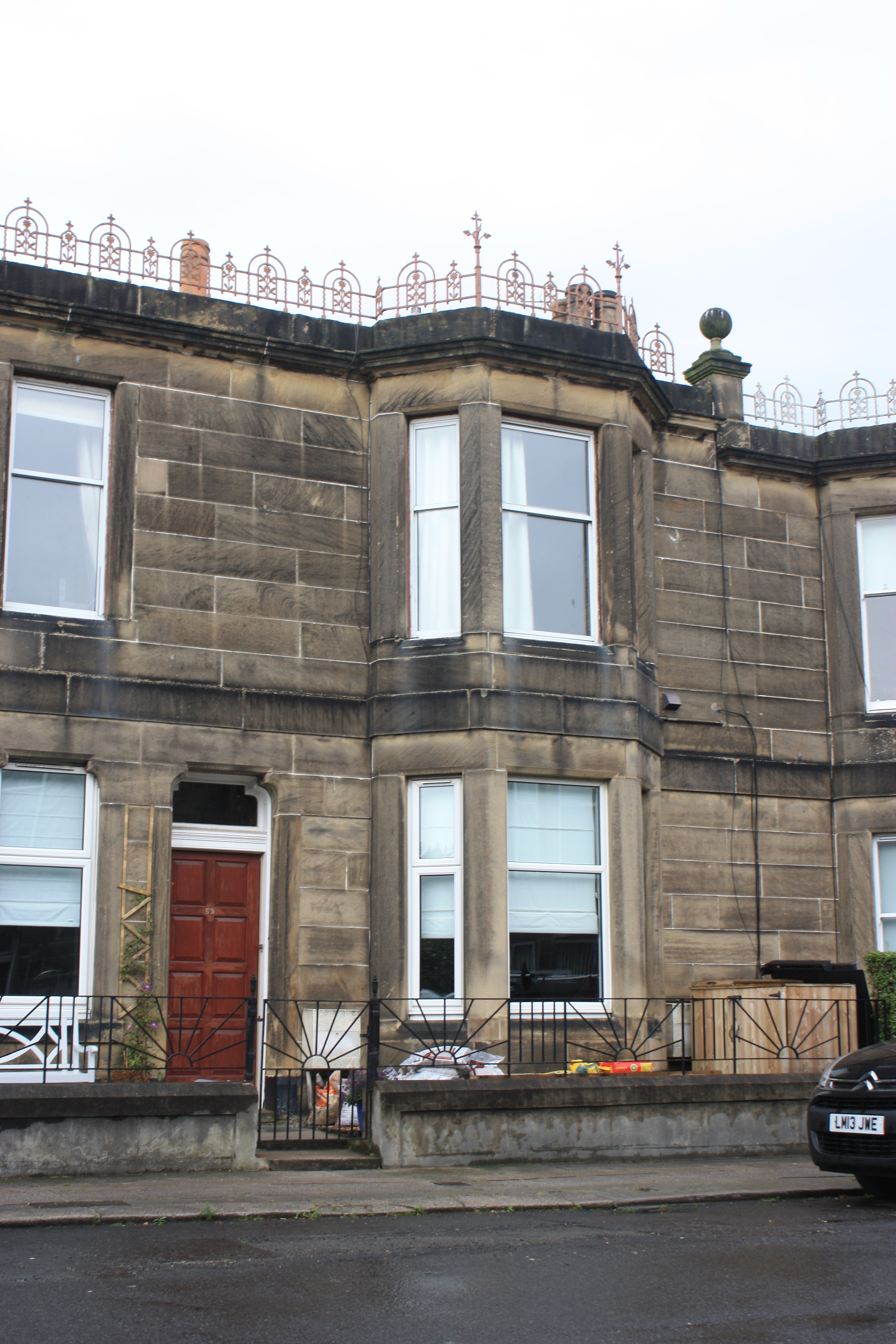
69 Dudley Avenue, Edinburgh

Sheila Scott was born in Edinburgh, Scotland, on 23 April 1910, the daughter of Helen Myers Meldrum and James Alexander Scott. The family lived at 24 Dudley Avenue close to Trinity Academy, where her father was a teacher.

She attended Trinity Academy, Edinburgh, during which time her father was appointed rector of the academy. Between 1926 and 1928 she attended Edinburgh Ladies' College (now The Mary Erskine School), where she graduated as dux in mathematics and joint dux of the college. She studied at the University of Edinburgh, graduating in 1932 with an MA in mathematics and natural philosophy. Afterwards, she continued her studies at Girton College, Cambridge, taking the Mathematical Tripos. In her final year at the university she worked on a research project under the supervision of Mary Cartwright. This resulted in her first published work On the Asymptotic Periods of Integral Functions.

== Career ==
Between 1934 and 1940 Scott taught mathematics at a number of schools. During this period Edmund Whittaker introduced Scott to fellow mathematician Archibald James Macintyre. The two married in 1940, and shortly after she was appointed as an assistant lecturer at the University of Aberdeen, where her husband was a lecturer. During this time she began working on her doctoral thesis. While pregnant with her second child, she stopped teaching but continued research. She received her PhD from Aberdeen in 1947 with the thesis Some Problems in Interpolatory Function Theory and under the supervision of Edward Maitland Wright.

Between 1947 and 1958 she published another 10 papers during a period where the couple had three children: Alister William Macintyre (born 1944), Douglas (born 1946 – died 1948 of enteritis) and Susan Elizabeth Macintyre Cantey (born 1950). Of her research during this time, Wright wrote "... good as her research was there would have been more of it had she not had a family to look after." In 1956 she and Edith Witte published the book German-English Mathematical Vocabulary.

In 1958, the family emigrated to Cincinnati, United States, where Macintyre accepted a visiting professorship at the University of Cincinnati. Also in 1958, she was elected a Fellow of the Royal Society of Edinburgh.

Sheila Scott Macintyre died in 1960 in Cincinnati from breast cancer.

Mary Cartwright writes in her obituary "She is remembered as an exceptionally clear lecturer, and an excellent teacher with a warm-hearted but realistic interest in each of her students and also as a charming and helpful and often amusing colleague."
