= Roccabella =

Roccabella Condominiums
- Rendering of the project

- Location within Montreal

General information
- Status: Completed
- Type: Luxury condominiums
- Location: 1300 René Lévesque Blvd. W., Montreal, Quebec, Canada
- Coordinates: 45.496819°N 73.571579°W
- Construction started: 2013
- Completed: 2016
- Owner: MC Finance

Height
- Height: 147 metres (482 ft)

Technical details
- Floor count: 40

Design and construction
- Architecture firm: Béïque Legault Thuot Architectes
- Structural engineer: NCK
- Services engineer: Aecom
- Main contractor: Magil Construction

Other information
- Parking: 5 levels underground

Website
- www.roccabella.ca

Roccabella is a condominium complex in Montreal, Quebec, Canada, located next to the Bell Centre in downtown Montreal, at Mountain Street and René-Lévesque Blvd.

The project consists of two 40-floor towers containing 552 condominium units.

- Drummond Tower
- De la Montagne Tower

Construction began in 2013 and was completed in early 2016 for the first tower. Construction of the second tower began in late 2016.

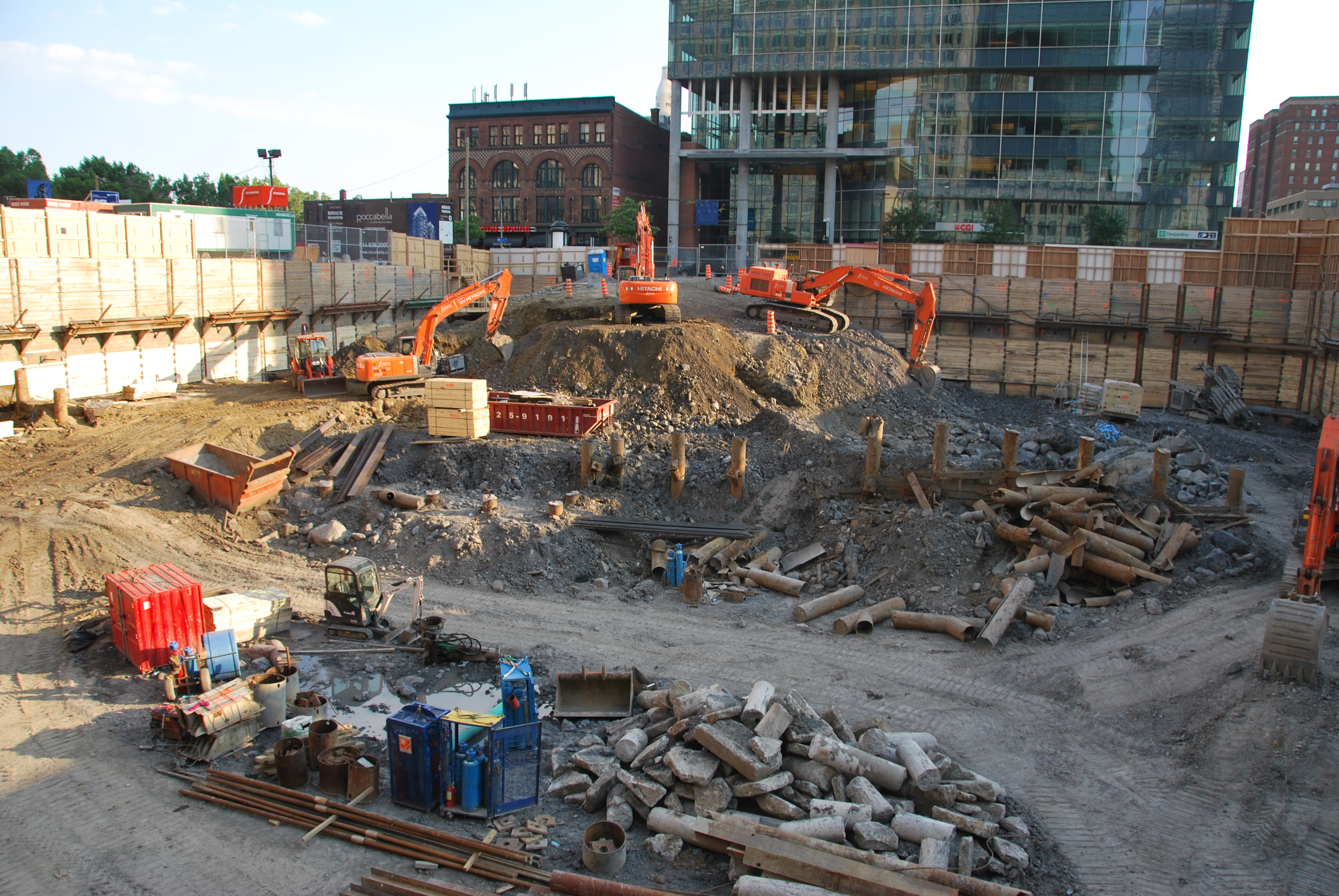
Construction site in July 2013

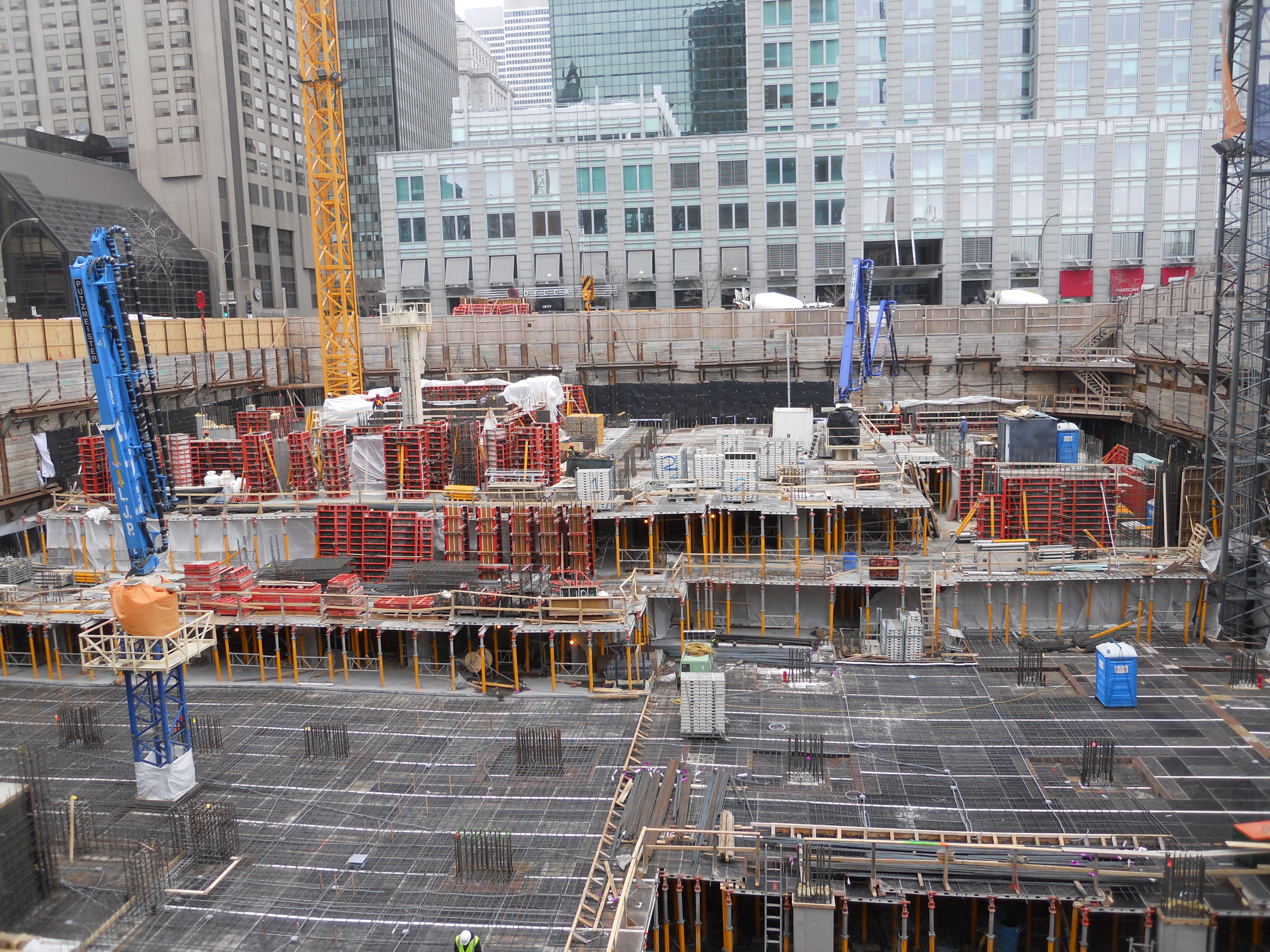
Construction site in March 2014

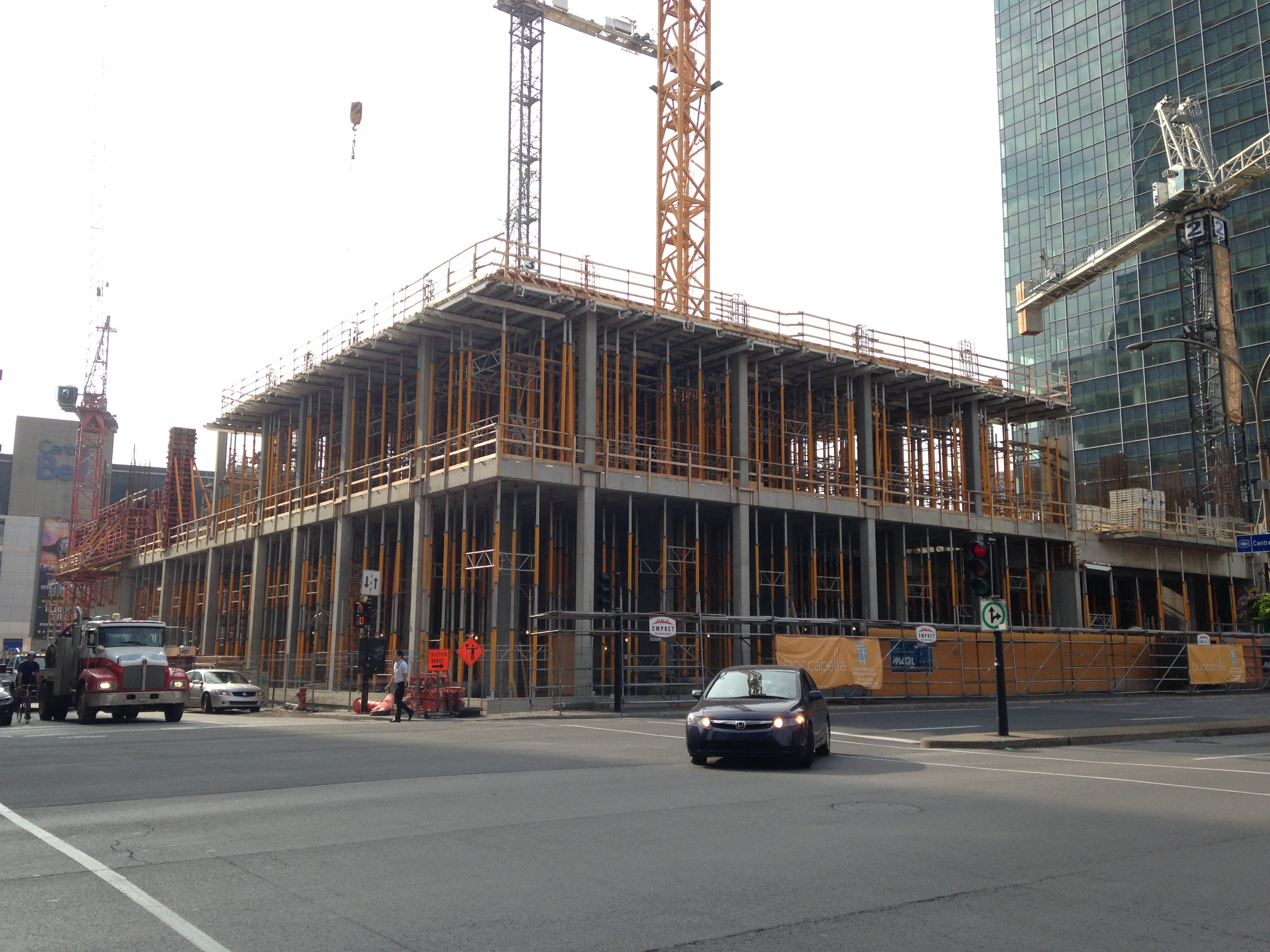
Construction site in September 2014

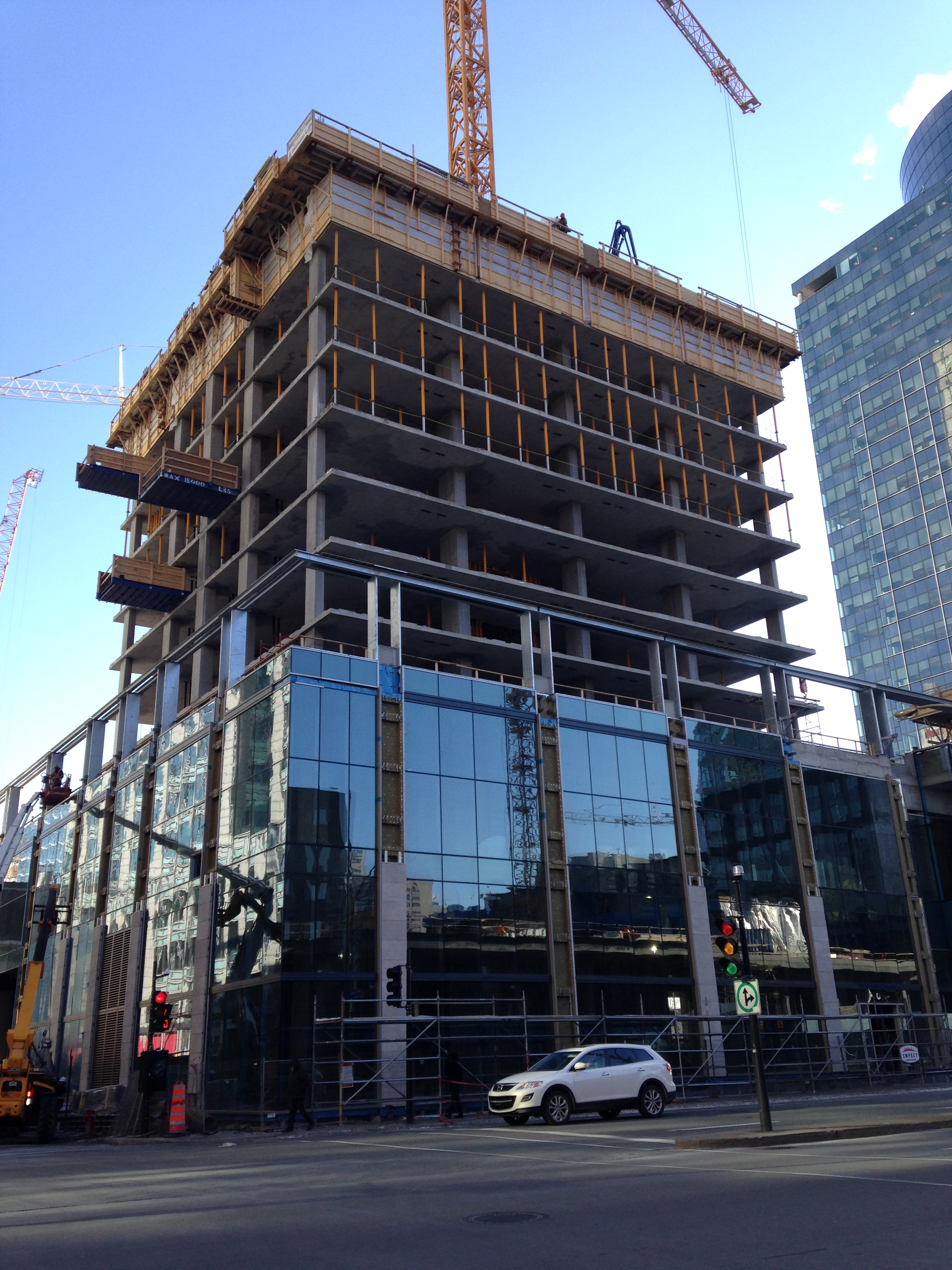
Construction site in December 2014

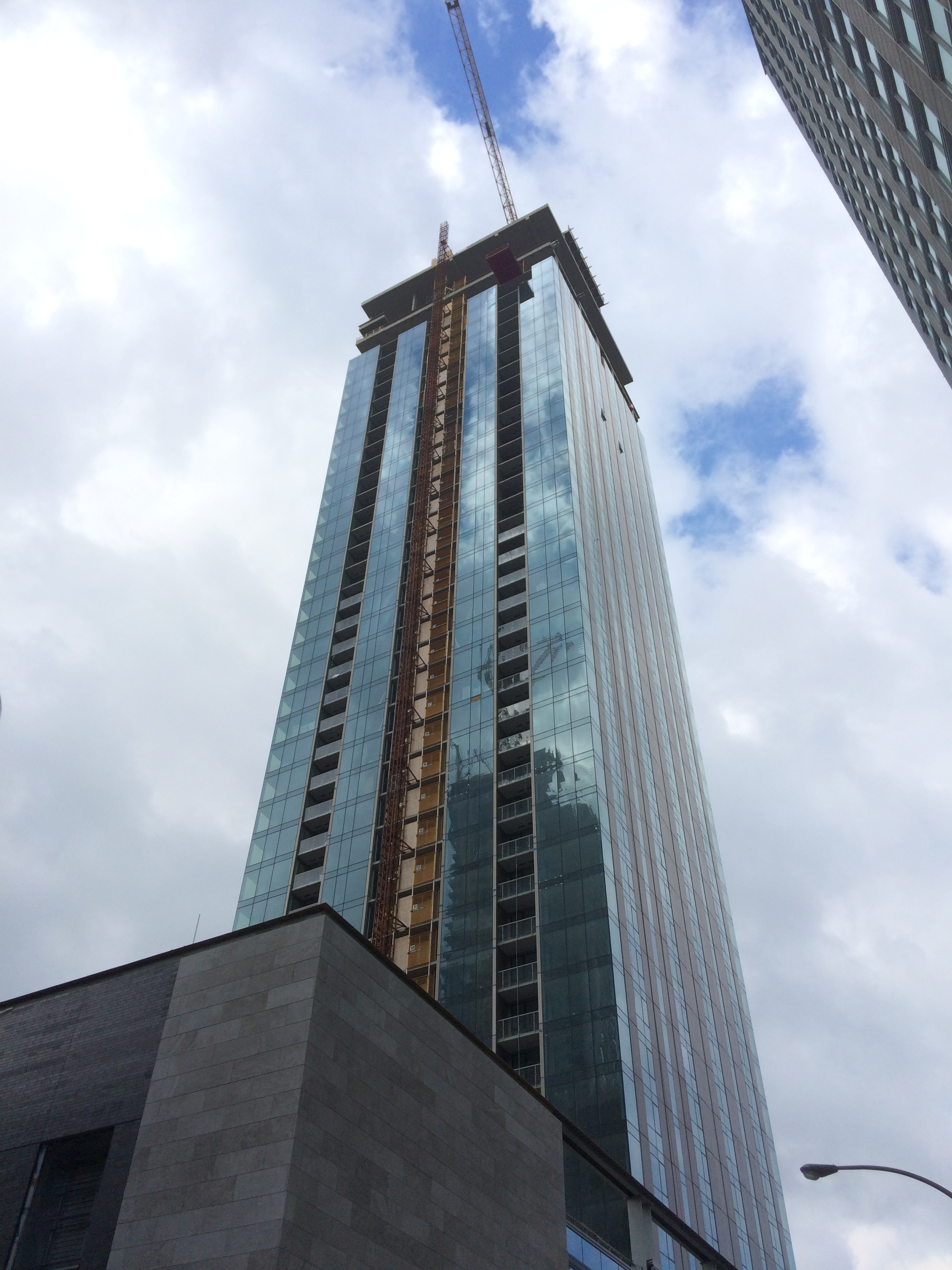
Construction site in October 2015
