= BLTA =

Canadian architecture firm

BLTA architecture urbaine

Practice information
- Key architects: Jacques Béïque, Olivier Legault, Gilles Thuot, Denis C. Blais
- Founded: 1970
- Location: Montreal, Quebec, Canada

Significant works and honors
- Buildings: E-Commerce Place, Le Crystal de la Montagne
- Projects: Roccabella Towers, Icone Towers

Béïque Legault Thuot (BLTA) is an architecture firm based in Montreal, Quebec, Canada. The firm is headed by three partners, Olivier Legault, Denis C. Blais and Cyr Beauchemin, with continued involvement from founding partners Gilles Thuot and Jacques Béïque.

== History ==
The architecture firm was founded in 1970 by Jacques Béïque. In 1971, the firm designed Quebec's first condo project, "Le Cerisaie". In 1990, they participated in the city of Montreal's first public consultation.

Since then, BLTA has completed nearly 2 million square feet of office space over the past decade and built more than 5,000 residential units in the greater Montreal metropolitan area.

== Major projects ==
The following is a list of major projects designed by Béïque Legault Thuot:

Current

- Roccabella Towers, Montreal
- Icone Towers, Montreal
- 701 University, Montreal
- Le Triomphe, Montreal

Past new construction

- 2011 – Cité Nature, Montreal
- 2007 – Le Crystal de la Montagne, Montreal
- 2004 – E-Commerce Place, Montreal
- 1992 – Maison Cuvillier-Ostel, Montreal
- 1990 – Domaine du parc Olympique II, Montreal

Past renovation/modification

- 2155 Rue Guy
- Peel Centre
- New Birks Building
- Gordon Brown Building
- École Charles-Bruneau
- Banque du Peuple
- Montreal Herald Building
- Windsor Hotel
- Beaudry (Montreal Metro)
