= Cité du Multimédia =

- Neighbourhood
- Location of Cité du Multimédia in Montreal
- Coordinates: 45.498889°N 73.5575°W
- Country: Canada
- Province: Quebec
- City: Montreal
- Borough: Ville-Marie
- Postal Code: H2Y, H3C
- Area codes: 514, 438

The Cité du Multimédia (French pronunciation: [site dy myltimedja]) is a neighborhood in Montreal, Quebec, Canada, located between Old Montreal, Griffintown and Downtown Montreal. The neighborhood is the result of a vast real-estate project launched by the Quebec government in the late 1990s which redeveloped abandoned nineteenth century industrial buildings into a business cluster for information technology companies.

Groupe Cardinal Hardy and Groupe Provencher & Roy architectes collaborated on the district's urban design.

== History ==
The Société de Développement de Montréal possessed land holdings dating back to Jean Doré administration's failed Quartier des Récluses initiative, in which lands were bought by the SIMPA to make way for the project. In exchange for handing this over, the SDM gained a minority stake in a joint venture with the real estate arms of the Caisse de dépôt et placement du Québec (CDPQ) and the FTQ Fonds de Solidarité to fund the construction of the Cité, which occurred in eight phases, with additional phases having been planned. The Parti Québécois Bouchard Government of Québec then gave payroll tax credits to employers for moving to the new Cité du Multimédia buildings.

After the bursting of the dot-com bubble, and the elimination of tax incentives for information technology jobs in the district by the Liberal government of Jean Charest in 2003, phase 9 and others were cancelled, and the structures were sold by the joint venture to the private sector.

== Economy ==
Many high-tech companies are still located in the area, while phase 8 is occupied by the municipal government. The property values in this part of Montreal are very high. The neighbourhood has 6,000 workers, and an average salary of $73,000 per year. This figure is almost 25% above Montréal's average.

== Controversy ==
Then-finance minister Bernard Landry had been criticized by members of Montreal's real-estate community and some high-tech entrepreneurs when Finance Ministry programs enticed companies to relocate to Cité Multimédia and the Cité du commerce électronique downtown in order to receive tax assistance. In response, Landry announced the creation of the "Centres de développement des technologies de l’information" (Information Technology Development Centres) located in mid-sized cities throughout Quebec, and later the installation of technology clusters in rural areas, such as the Technoparc Rolland in Sainte-Adèle, Quebec.

The Cité du Multimédia was also put under investigation in the context of the Charbonneau Commission inquiries.
