= Archibald James Macintyre =

Prof Archibald James Macintyre HFRSE (3 July 1908 – 4 August 1967) was a British-born mathematician.

== Life ==
He was born in Sheffield on 3 July 1908, the second child of William Ewart Archibald Macintyre (b.1878) previously of Long Eaton, and his wife, Mary Beatrice Askew. His father was a schoolmaster in Sheffield and his mother was a former teacher.

Archibald was educated at the Central Secondary School in Sheffield (previously known as the High Storrs Grammar School). He left school in 1926 and won a place at Magdalene College, Cambridge studying a Mathematics Tripos under Arthur Stanley Ramsey. Fellow students included Donald Coxeter, Raymond Paley and Harold Davenport. He graduated BA as a Wrangler in 1929 then began research under Dr Edward Collingwood.

In 1930 he became an assistant lecturer in both applied maths and theoretical physics at Cambridge University. He received his doctorate (PhD) in 1933. In 1936 he accepted a post of lecturer at Aberdeen University. He stayed at Aberdeen for many years, rising to senior lecturer. In 1947 he was elected an Honorary Fellow of the Royal Society of Edinburgh. His proposers were E. M. Wright, Ivor Etherington, Edward Thomas Copson, Edmund Taylor Whittaker and James Cossar.

In 1958 he moved to the University of Cincinnati in the United States, as a visiting professor of mathematics. He was recruited primarily as a reaction to Sputnik. America wanted to increase its role in the sciences and math. His wife stayed in Aberdeen, Scotland where she continued to teach mathematics at King's College. A year later he accepted a permanent position at the University of Cincinnati and sent for his wife who was also given a teaching position as a lecturer in mathematics. They formed a highly unusual husband-wife team.

He died in Cincinnati on 4 August 1967, eight years after his wife died of breast cancer.

== Family ==
In 1940, he married Sheila Scott, a noted mathematician in her own right.

They had three children: Alister William (February 8, 1944 – May 17, 2017), Douglas who died at age two in 1948, and Susan Elizabeth who currently teaches mathematics for Walnut Hills High School in Cincinnati.
