= CGI Inc. =

Multinational information technology company

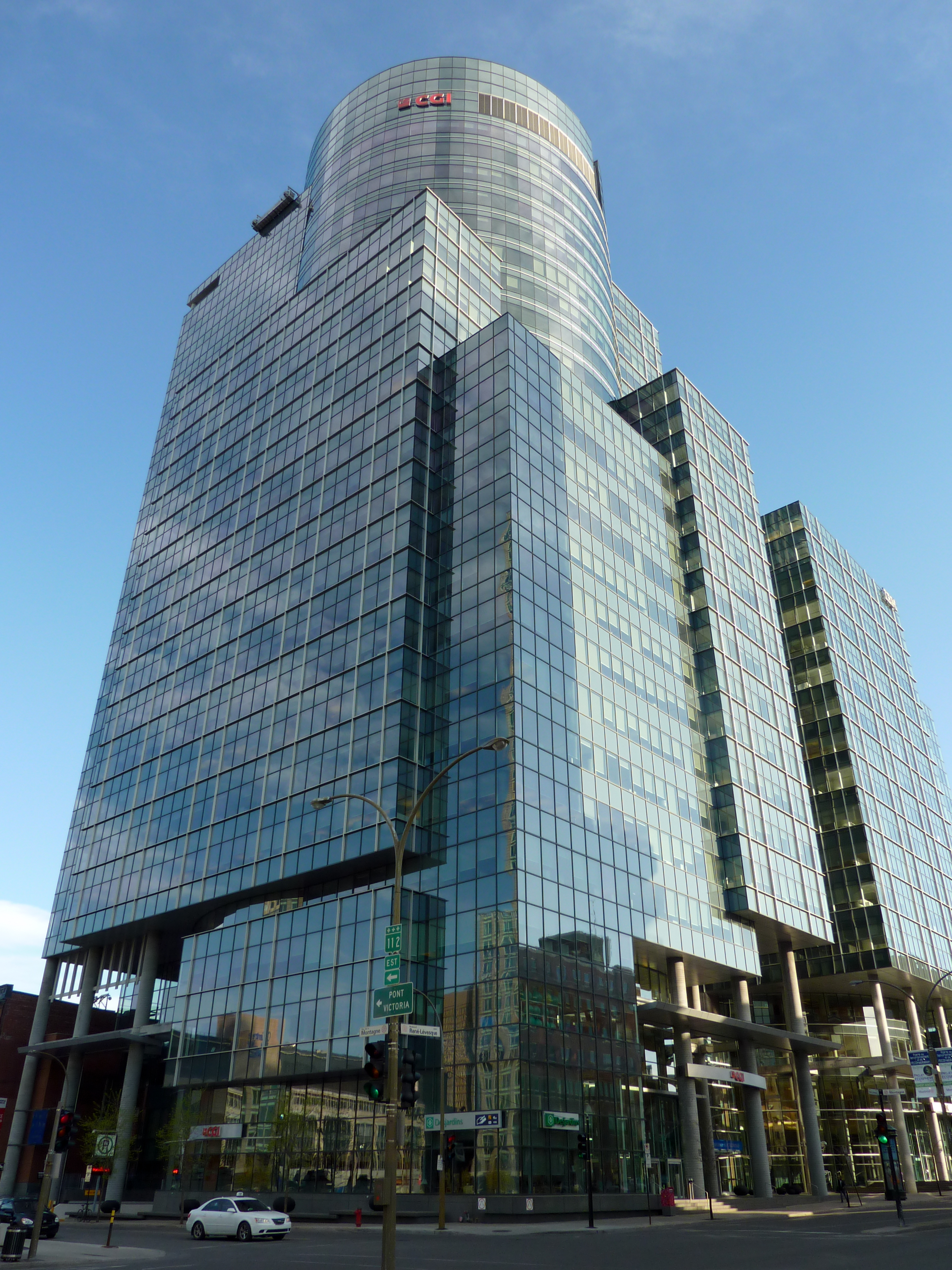
- E-Commerce Place in Montreal, Quebec, whose primary tenant is CGI
- Native name: Consultants to Government & Industries
- Type: Public
- Traded as: TSX: GIB.A; NYSE: GIB; S&P/TSX 60 component
- Industry: Information technology Consulting; Outsourcing
- Founded: June 1976; 50 years ago
- Founders: Serge Godin; André Imbeau
- Headquarters: E-Commerce Place, Montreal, Quebec, Canada
- Area served: Worldwide
- Key people: Serge Godin (co-chair); Julie Godin (executive chair); Tim Hurlebaus (president and CEO)
- Services: Business consulting, system integrations, application development testing and maintenance services, infrastructure services, cloud computing, IoT applications
- Revenue: ▲CA$15.9 billion (2025)
- Operating income: ▼CA$2.24 billion (2025)
- Net income: ▼CA$1.66 billion (2025)
- Total assets: ▲CA$19.5 billion (2025)
- Total equity: ▲CA$10.3 billion (2025)
- Number of employees: 94,000 (2025)
- Website: www.cgi.com

CGI is a multinational information technology consulting and software development company headquartered in Montreal, Quebec, Canada. CGI went public in 1986 with a primary listing on the Toronto Stock Exchange. CGI is also a constituent of the S&P/TSX 60 and has a secondary listing on the New York Stock Exchange.

As of 2025, CGI is based in 40+ countries with around 400 offices worldwide with 94,000 employees. CGI mainly works in application services, business consulting, business process Management, IT infrastructure services, IT outsourcing services, and systems integration services.

== History ==
=== 1970s–1980s: Early years ===
CGI Inc. was founded as an IT consulting company on June 15, 1976, in Quebec City, Québec, by Serge Godin. Within several months he was joined by co-founder André Imbeau from Quebec City. They initially ran the business from Godin's basement with a single phone. Starting with one client, as the company grew in size the co-founders moved to Montreal, and by the end of their first year they had generated $138,000 in revenue. While CGI stands for "Conseillers en gestion et informatique" in French (which translates to "consultants in management and information technology"), the official English meaning would later become "Consultants to Government and Industry." In later years the company began to go to market as simply CGI.

Throughout the 1970s, CGI focused on the information technology (IT) services market. Later in the 1970s, CGI branched into IT outsourcing. CGI's annual revenue in 1986 was $25 million, and the same year CGI went public with an initial public offering (IPO).

=== 1990s: Doubling in size ===
CGI earned ISO 9001 certification for their "project management framework" in 1994, and in doing so became the first IT consulting firm in North America to comply with the ISO quality standard. In 1995, CGI entered into a commercial alliance with the large telecommunications company Bell Canada, with Bell Canada purchasing CGI shares then valued at $18.4 million. By the end of 1996, CGI's annual revenue was $122 million. In 1997, CGI acquired the company CDSL Holdings Limited (CDSL). After the acquisition, CGI's employees in both Canada and internationally numbered 2,500. In 1998 CGI acquired the Canadian company Bell Sygma, a Bell Canada subsidiary, which almost doubled CGI's size.

=== 2000s: Expansion into international markets ===
CGI acquired IMRGlobal in 2001 for $438 million, which added "global delivery options" for CGI. In 2003, the Canadian tech company Cognicase was bought out by CGI for US$221 million, and at the end of 2003 CGI had annual sales of $1.85 billion. In 2004, CGI purchased the majority of American Management Systems (AMS) for $858 million. As of late 2004, CGI was the world's eighth largest independent provider of information technology services.

CGI co-founder Serge Godin stepped aside as CEO in 2006, taking the new position of executive chairman of the board and appointing as new CEO Michael Roach. Annual revenue at CGI was $3.5 billion by the fiscal end of 2006. That same year, CGI became one of four primary Recovery Audit Contractors in the US, with responsibilities to audit region B. At the end of 2007, CGI had a backlog worth $12.04 billion and an annual revenue of $3.7 billion, employing around 26,500 people.

=== 2010–2012: Second doubling in size ===
In 2010, CGI acquired Stanley, Inc. for an enterprise value of approximately $1.07 billion. The deal came close to doubling CGI's presence in the United States and expanded CGI into defense and intelligence contracts. In 2010, CGI was included in the Forbes Global 2000 ranking of the 2,000 largest public companies in the world. As of 2011, there were 31,000 CGI employees in 125 offices worldwide and 89% of professionals at CGI also owned company shares.

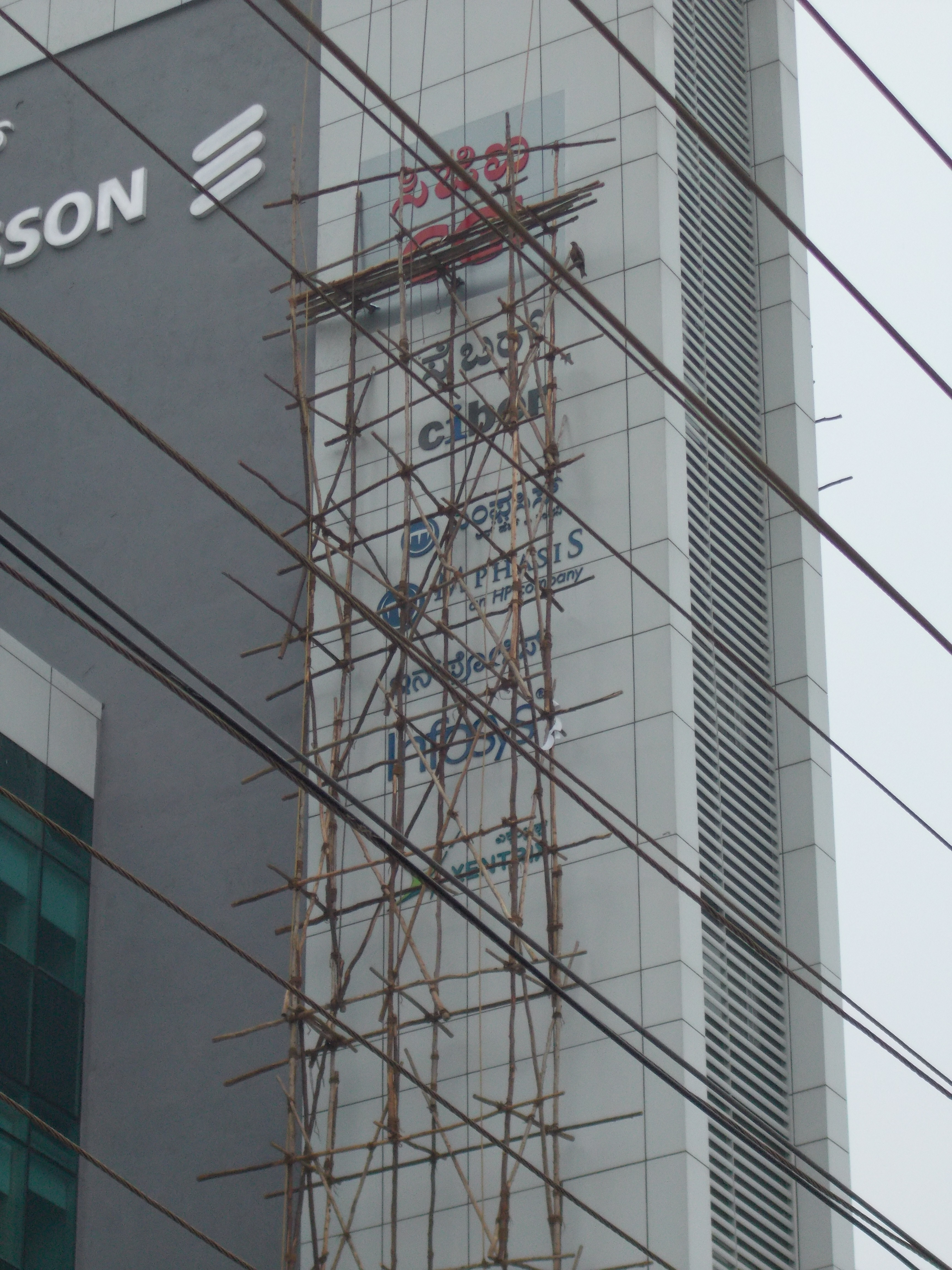
Pictured in 2013 is the Logica CMG building in Bangalore being renamed to CGI, following the 2012 acquisition.

In 2012, CGI acquired the UK-based computer services company Logica for £1.7 billion (CAN$2.7 billion) in cash. The acquisition raised the number of CGI's staff from 31,000 to 68,000, and CGI became the fifth largest independent business processes and IT services company in the world. It also made CGI the biggest tech firm in Canada. In 2012, CGI won a $143 million contract to provide operational support for the Army's training elements, the Deputy Chief of Staff for Intelligence, and the United States Army Training and Doctrine Command.

=== 2013–2015: Contract work ===
At the time, CGI's train occupancy mobile app, iNStAPP, was being used by several train companies and institutions in Europe. In February 2013, the independent analyst firm Verdantix published a report comparing technology consulting and systems integration firms' ability to build efficient renewable energy management systems. The report named CGI as No. 4 on the "overall capabilities" score. Continuing to work in the financial sector, CGI was rated as a "major contender" by Everest Group in a 2013 PEAK Matrix study looking at IT outsourcing capital markets.

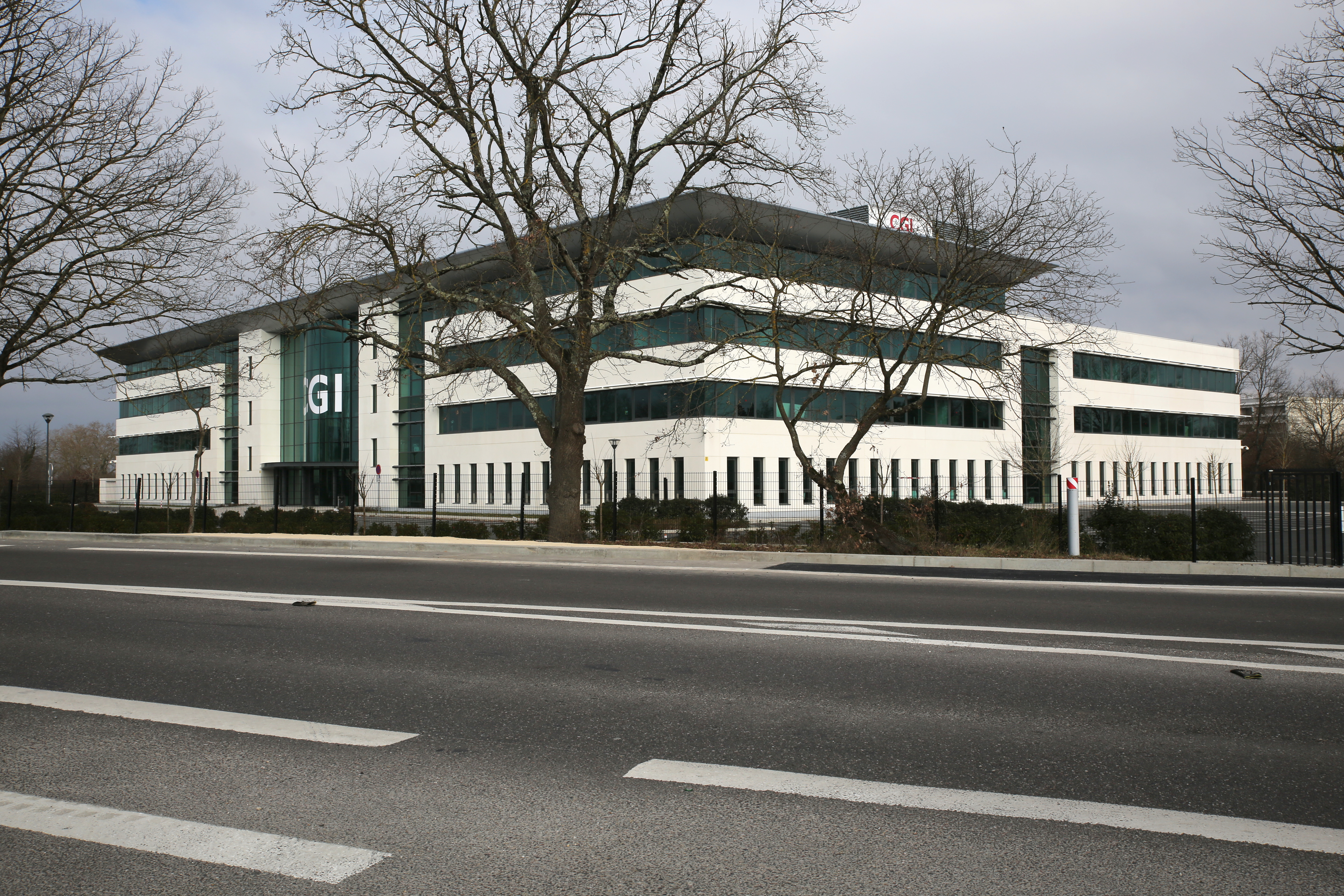
French CGI headquarters in Le Haillan, France, pictured in February 2015

In 2014, CGI had contracts with federal businesses such as Defense Information Services Agency, visa processing in China, and the Coast Guard and Department of Homeland Security. CGI also worked with state governments, for example the California Enterprise Data to Revenue (EDR) Project for the California Franchise Tax Board. In 2014, The Globe and Mail reported that CGI was operating ten security centers, from which 1,400 CGI employees monitor "data traffic for an undisclosed number of customers" that include the Canadian Payments Association, the National Bank of Canada, and about forty Canadian government departments.

By 2014, CGI had been working with the European space industry for years, and had developed software that helps support the missions of over 200 individual satellites. CGI had also created the Constellation Control Facility that control's the Galileo Commercial Service's 30 satellites, and software for the first satellite in the world with e-sail (electric solar wind sail). In 2014, CGI was awarded a new contract by Inmarsat, the safety communications provider for 98% of airlines. In 2014, 16% of CGI's revenue came from software.

In 2014, Canadian Business named Michael Roach, then CEO of CGI, the most innovative CEO of the Canada of the year. Fiscal revenue by the end of 2014 was C$10.5 billion, and in the first quarter of 2015, CGI had revenues of $2.54 billion.

=== 2016–present ===
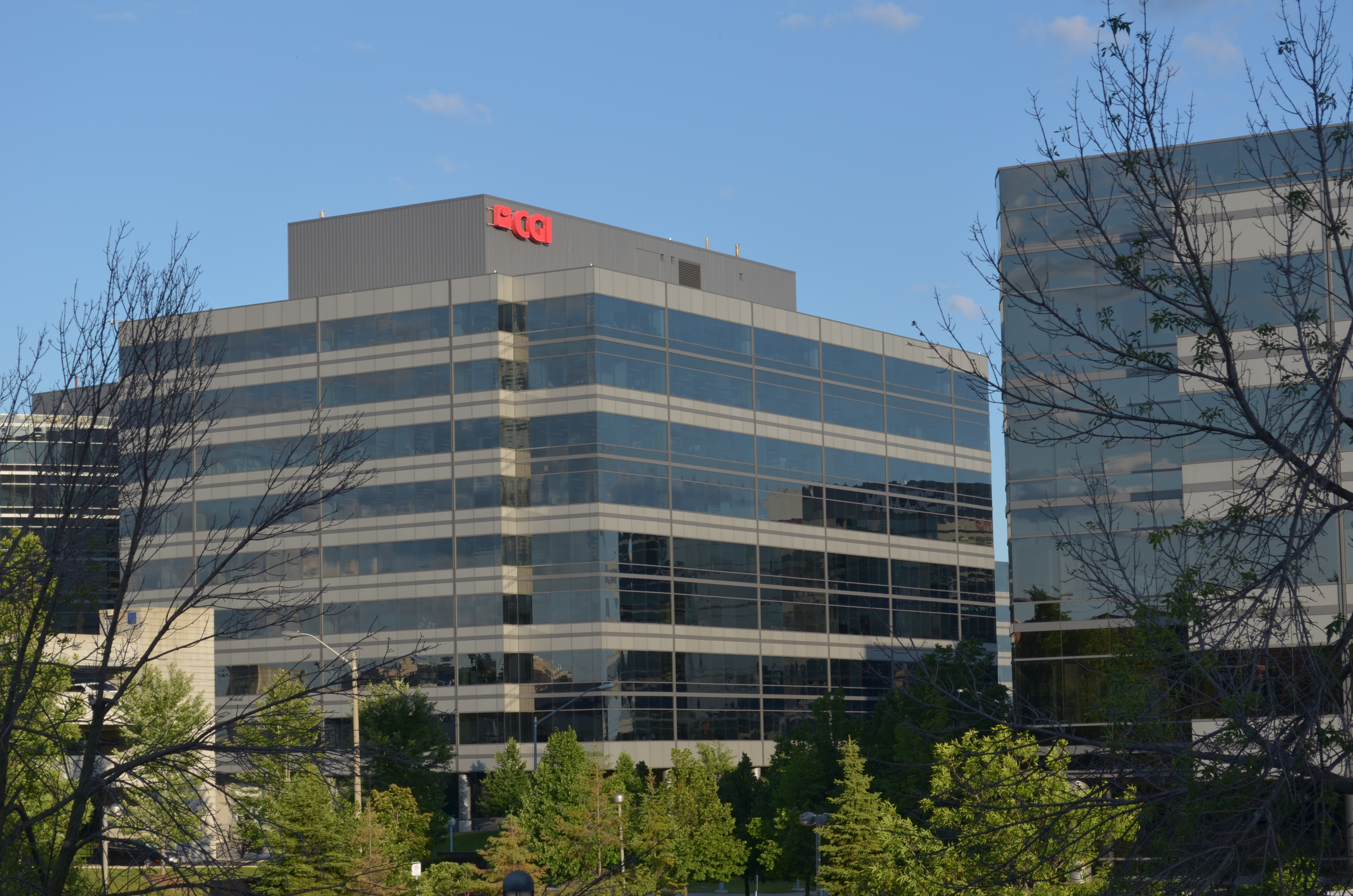
CGI office in Markham

As of 2016, CGI ranked number 955 on the Forbes Global 2000. At the time, CGI had assets worth C$20.9 billion, annual sales of $10.7 billion, and a market value of $9.6 billion.

In 2016, CGI had contracts with the British Columbia Ministry of Health, the U.S. Navy to work on their NAVSUP Business Systems Center, the Swedish social insurance agency, Sears Canada, and the Queensland government, among others.

In 2016, George D. Schindler succeeded Michael Roach as the third CEO in CGI's history.

In 2019, The Wall Street Journal indicated CGI was one of the cloud providers breached in the Chinese APT10 group's Operation Cloud Hopper hack, which exposed companies' data from 2013 to 2017. The first known target was Rio Tinto, who was accessed through CGI's managed cloud.

In 2024, François Boulanger succeeded George D. Schindler as the CEO.

In 2026, Tim Hulebaus was named CEO upon the announcement of François Boulanger’s retirement.

== Corporate affairs ==
CGI originally stood for "Conseillers en gestion et informatique" (translated to English: "Consultants on management and information systems"). More recently, in English speaking countries it is taken to stand for "Consultants to Government and Industries".

=== Markets and corporate structure ===
CGI has an international client base, with large institutional clients in a wide array of industries and markets. The United States made up 29% of their client base as of March 2015, while Canada was the second-highest percentage at 15%. The majority of CGI's remaining contracts were in Europe (around 40%), with 15% in the rest of the world.

CGI has a primary listing on the Toronto Stock Exchange and is a constituent of the S&P/TSX 60. It has a secondary listing on the New York Stock Exchange. As of March 2015, CGI made 42% of its revenue through government contracts.

=== CGI Federal ===
CGI Federal is a wholly owned subsidiary of CGI Inc. CGI Federal has partnered with U.S. federal agencies to provide IT services in defense, diplomacy, intelligence, healthcare, environment, homeland security, justice, treasury and more. CGI Federal has annual revenue exceeding US$1 billion.

In 2018, CGI Federal opened an Innovation Center in Arlington, Virginia, to provide a collaboration space for agency and CGI experts to explore the potential of new technologies.

== Products and services ==
Originally CGI focused its products and services on IT consulting, and the company later branched into outsourcing, software development, and systems integration, among other industries. At the end of 2014, CGI earned 52% of its revenue from providing outsourcing services (specifically through IT services and to a lesser degree, business process services) and 48% of its revenue from systems integration and consulting. Services CGI supplies in relation to business consulting include business intelligence, business transformation, change management, cyber security, CIO advisory services, digital enterprise, as well as other industry-specific services. In relation to business process services, CGI offers customer service and billing, payment services, enterprise services, collections, engineering and logistics, document and data services, and a BPS service launch. CGI provides full IT outsourcing services. The following is an overview of services provided by CGI as of 2015:

- Application services
- Business consulting
- Business process services
- Infrastructure services
- IT outsourcing services
- Systems integration services

CGI also develops products and services for markets such as Banking and finance, telecommunications, health, Manufacturing, Life sciences, oil and gas, posts and logistics, retail and consumer services, transportation, and utilities. Clients include both private entities and central governments, state, provincial and local governments, and government departments dealing with defense, intelligence, space, health, human services, public safety, justice, tax, revenue and collections.

== Awards ==
CGI Federal was ranked 26th on the 2018 Washington Technology Top 100, and 72nd on the 2019 Bloomberg Government 200 (BGOV200). The company also was a finalist for the 2018 Greater Washington Government Contractor Awards, Contractor of the Year ($300 million+), and a 2017 ACT-IACT Igniting Innovation Award.

A number of CGI Federal executives have been recognized for leadership in their sectors, including: Tim Hurlebaus, president: 2019 Wash100, 2018 Fed100 and GovCon 2018 Executive of the Year finalist; Stephanie Mango, senior vice president: 2018 Pinnacle Awards, National Security Executive of the Year and 2018 Top 10 Executives to Watch In National Security; Malcolm Harden, vice president: 2019 Fed100; and Steve Sousa, senior vice president: 2018 Top 10 Health Care Leaders to Watch.

== Controversies ==
CGI faced notable challenges with its involvement in the HealthCare.gov website for the U.S. government. As reported by Vanity Fair, CGI's work on the site frustrated government officials due to missed deadlines, with the CMS's chief operating officer stating, "If we could fire them, we would." The Washington Post further highlighted that the company's previous project controversies were not taken into account when awarding the healthcare.gov contract. Additionally, Reuters documented the U.S. government's decision to part ways with CGI after the site "failed to work when it launched in October" and experienced ongoing issues, further igniting political debates.

Separately, in Ontario, CGI encountered issues with an online medical registry project. The Washington Examiner reported that eHealth Ontario, an Ontario provincial agency, decided to cancel CGI Group's $46.2 million contract related to the registry due to being 14 months behind schedule. Furthermore, the contract was terminated, and a group of other IT companies successfully replicated the registry, rendering CGI's project obsolete. Consequently, due to contract stipulations requiring payment only upon satisfactory delivery, the province refused to pay CGI.

In Hawaii, the Affordable Care Act's implementation via the Hawaii Health Connector faced significant obstacles, leading to the resignation of its executive director, Coral Andrews. The Hawaii Health Connector had secured $200 million in federal funding for its establishment, with CGI Group developing its website at a cost of $53 million. However, the website's launch on Oct. 1 encountered severe technical issues, causing user frustrations due to site crashes and inaccessibility. Despite expectations from officials, including Gov. Neil Abercrombie, for a large enrollment, as of Nov. 15, only 257 individuals successfully secured healthcare through the platform. Senate President Donna Mercado Kim had previously cautioned against employing CGI Group, referencing their involvement with the problematic Hawaii state tax department website.

CGI, who was instrumental in developing Hawaii's computerized tax system and a disease surveillance system, has also come under scrutiny from that state's auditor. The system installed by CGI has been credited with a $66 million increase in tax collections since 2008. The state Legislature initiated an audit following concerns about the $25 million contract awarded to CGI for the delinquent tax system and several other contracts. These concerns were spurred by suspicions of improprieties in the contract award process and the modification of an original contract in CGI's favor. The adjusted agreement appeared more beneficial to CGI than to Hawaii, according to House Finance Chairman Marcus Oshiro. The audit was influenced by claims from a former tax research officer, Tu Duc Pham, who suggested that the revised agreement with CGI unduly favored the company. Besides the tax department, the Health Department's ties with CGI are also being evaluated due to noncompetitive contracts awarded to the firm. Overall, CGI has received contracts amounting to approximately $90 million from Hawaii's Tax and Health departments since 1999, with a notable portion being awarded without competitive bidding.
