= De la Montagne Street =

Thoroughfare in Montreal, Canada

Rue de la Montagne
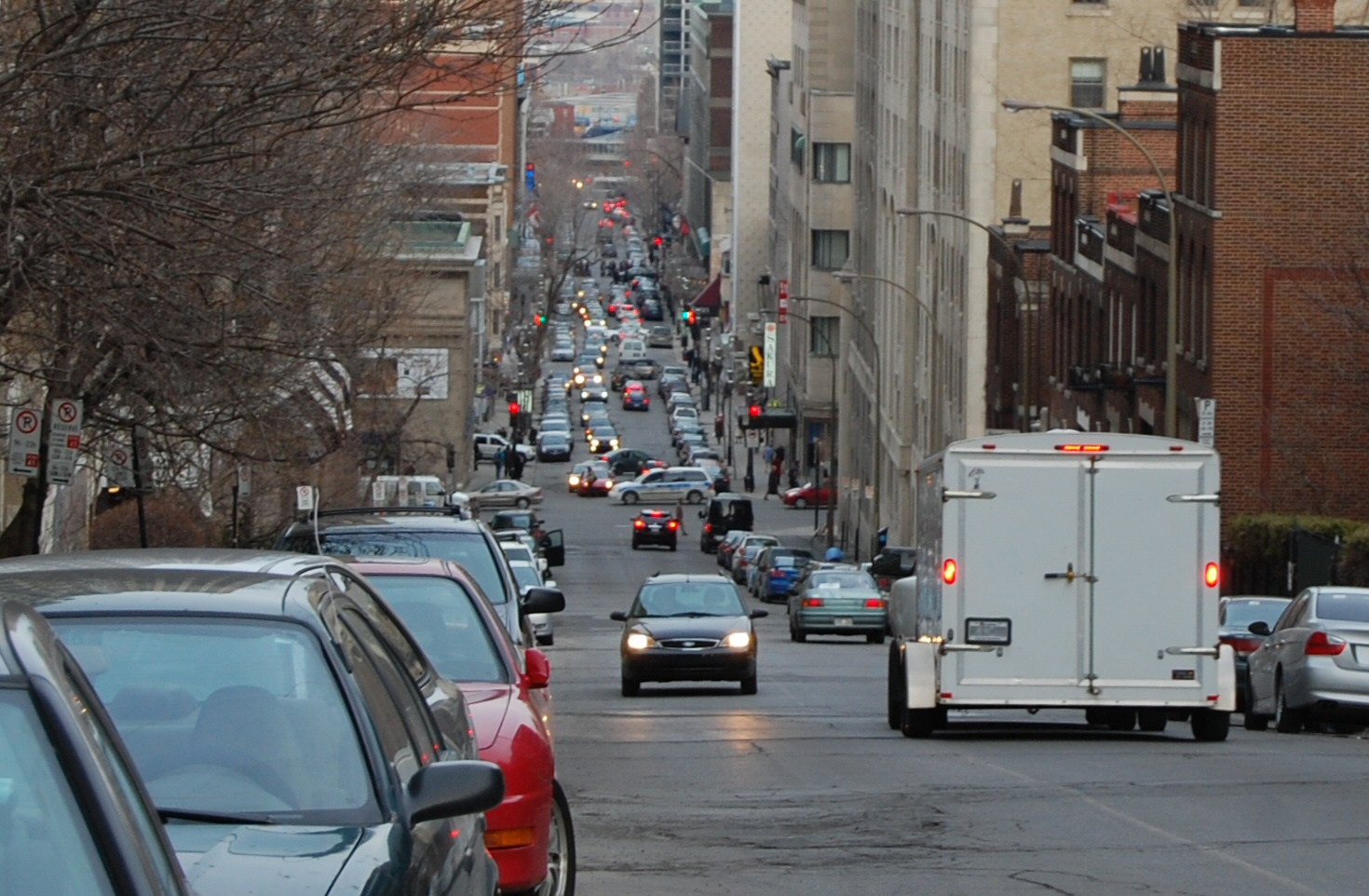
- Rue de la Montagne looking southward.
- Former name(s): avenue Redpath (Redpath Avenue), rue McCord (McCord Street), Côte à Bréhaut
- Length: 2.2 km (1.4 mi)
- Location: Between Doctor Penfield Avenue and Wellington Street, Montreal, Quebec, Canada
- Coordinates: 45.498359°N 73.575949°W
- Major junctions: R-136

Construction
- Construction start: Prior to 1761

Rue de la Montagne, also known as Mountain Street, is a north–south street located in downtown Montreal, Quebec, Canada. It starts at Wellington Street in the south and continues to above Doctor Penfield Avenue in the north, where it stops in a dead end just short of Pine Avenue. Notable businesses located along the street include Ogilvy's, an upscale department store.

== Name ==
According to the Quebec Toponymy Commission, the street is named after Mount Royal. A 1761 map shows a trail at the location of the current street called chemin des Sauvages de la montagne. It is also found under the name chemin de la Montagne in later maps, such as the map by surveyor Jean Péladeau in 1778.

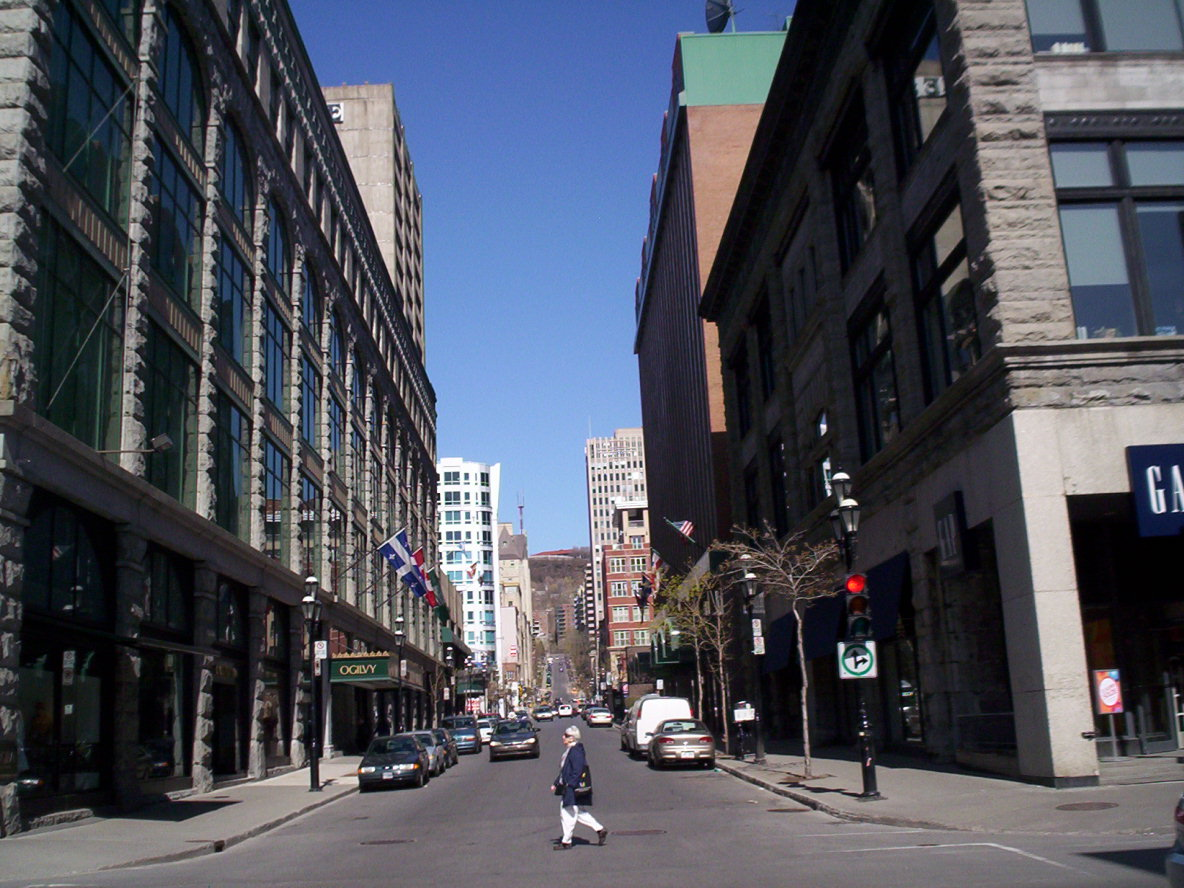
Rue de la Montagne, downtown.

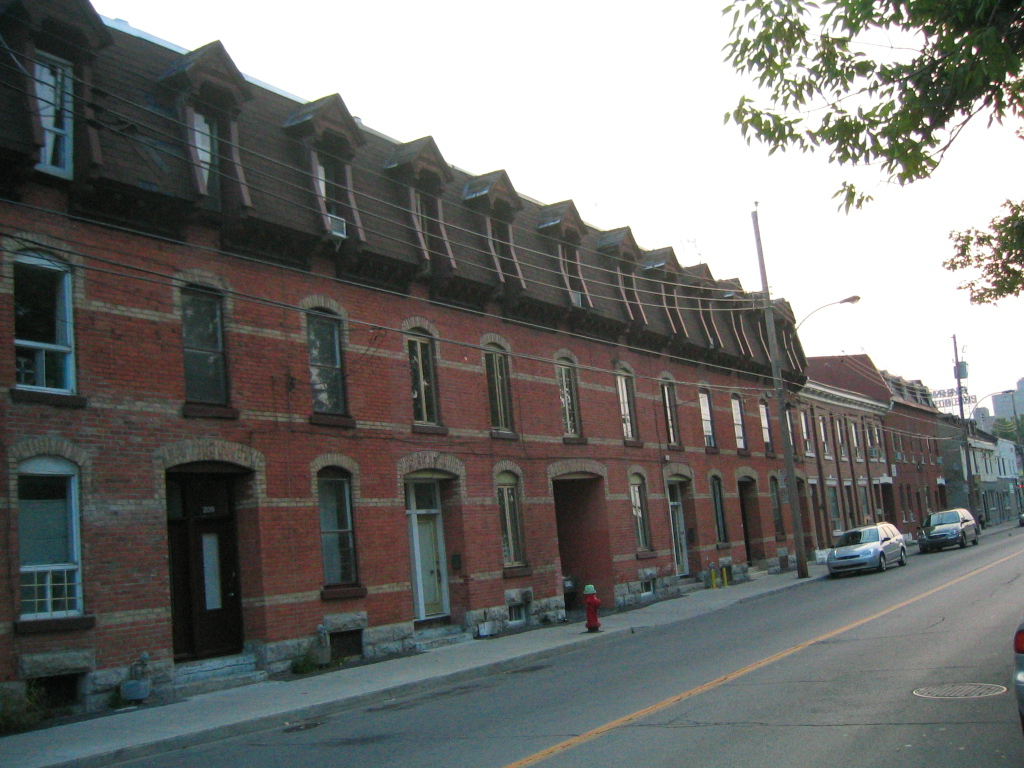
Rue de la Montagne in the Griffintown neighbourhood.

There is an urban legend that it was named after Jacob Mountain, first Anglican bishop of Quebec, or his son Bishop George Jehoshaphat Mountain. However, Jacob Mountain was neither the bishop nor resident in Quebec until 1793, long after the creation of maps bearing the name chemin de la Montagne.
