= Berri–UQAM station =

Montreal Metro station in the borough of Ville-Marie

Berri–UQAM
- Line 1 platform in 2026

General information
- Location: 1500 Rue Berri, Montréal, QC H2L 2C4; Canada
- Coordinates: 45°30′55″N 73°33′40″W
- Operator: Société de transport de Montréal
- Lines: Green Line; Orange Line; Yellow Line
- Platforms: Total: 6 side platforms; Orange Line: 2; Green Line: 2; Yellow Line: 2
- Tracks: Total: 6; Orange Line: 2; Green Line: 2; Yellow Line: 2
- Connections: STM bus; Gare d'autocars de Montréal

Construction
- Depth: 16.8 metres (55 feet 1 inch) (Green); 10.7 metres (35 feet 1 inch) (Orange); 27.4 metres (89 feet 11 inches) (Yellow), 2nd deepest
- Platform levels: 6
- Accessible: Yes (Orange and Green lines only; planned for the Yellow Line)
- Architect: Longpré et Marchand; Gaétan Pelletier (kiosk built in 1999)

Other information
- Fare zone: ARTM: A

History
- Opened: 14 October 1966
- Former names: Berri-de-Montigny (1966–1988)

Passengers
- 2024: 9,272,709 ▲6.79%
- Rank: 1 of 68

Services
Preceding station	Montreal Metro	Following station
Saint-Laurent toward Angrignon	Green Line	Beaudry toward Honoré-Beaugrand
Champ-de-Mars toward Côte-Vertu	Orange Line	Sherbrooke toward Montmorency
Terminus	Yellow Line	Jean-Drapeau toward Longueuil
Location

Berri–UQAM station is a Montreal Metro station in the borough of Ville-Marie, in Montreal, Quebec, Canada. It is operated by the Société de transport de Montréal (STM) and is the system's central station. This station is served by the Green, Orange, and Yellow lines. It is located in the Quartier Latin.

Berri–UQAM is the 2nd deepest station in the network, and also the busiest station in the network, transfers not included. If transfers were included, the 13 million passengers number would rise to about 35–40 million a year.

== History ==
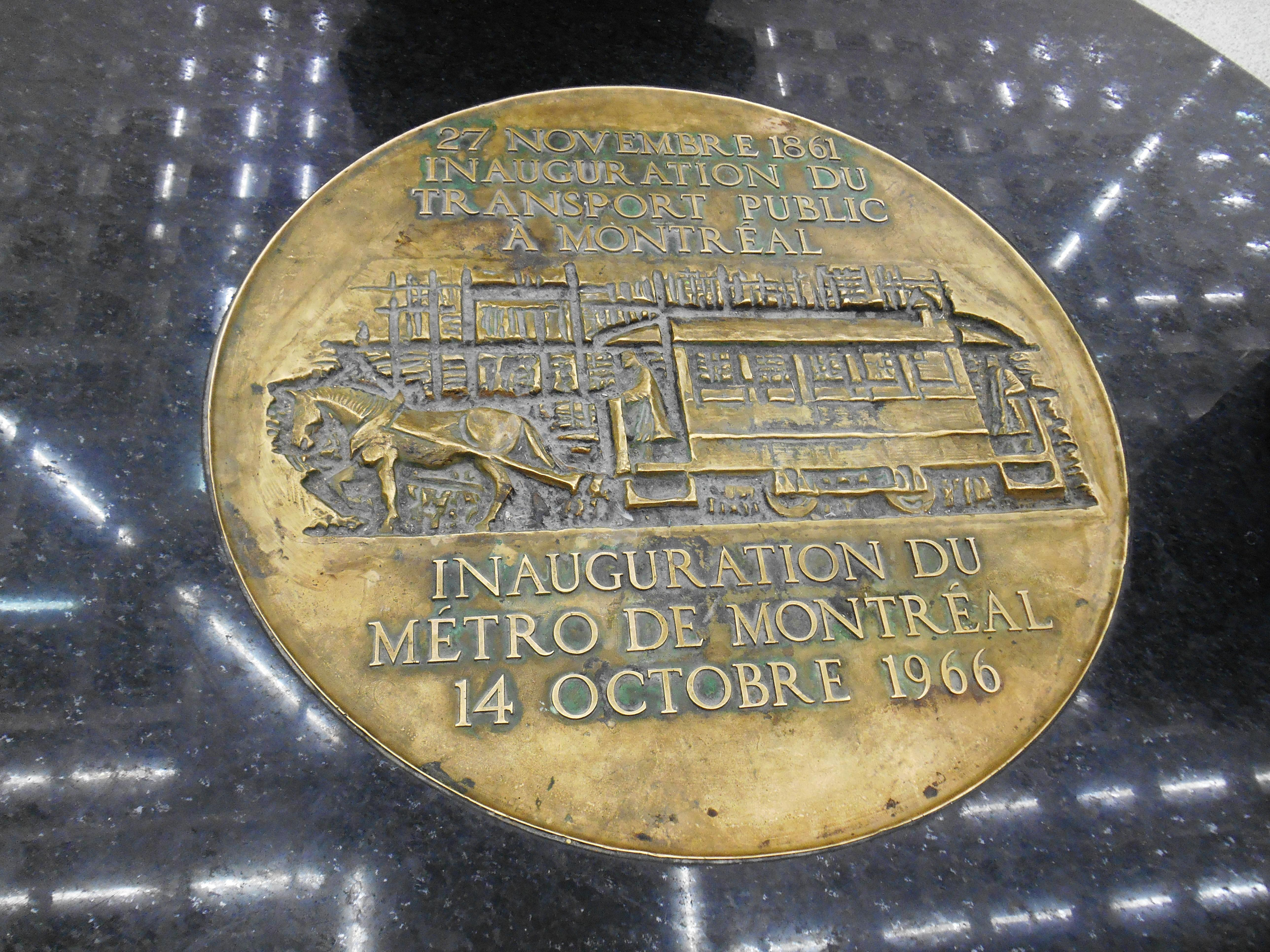
Bronze plaque commemorating the opening of the Montreal Metro in 1966

The station opened as Berri–De Montigny with the opening of the Metro on October 14, 1966, serving the Green and Orange lines.

The station was the site of the inauguration of the Metro by Mayor of Montreal Jean Drapeau, president of the Commission de transport de Montréal Lucien L'Allier and Archbishop of Montreal Paul-Émile Léger. A plaque commemorating the inauguration is located in the mezzanine. The Yellow Line entered service on April 28, 1967, serving the Expo 67 site on Île Sainte-Hélène.

In 1988, the station was renamed Berri–UQAM after the Université du Québec à Montréal located adjacent to the station.

On September 2, 2001, a canister of tear gas was set off inside the station, forcing the evacuation of the 300 passengers inside.

=== Station refurbishment ===
In 2007, STM began planning to refurbish the station, after learning that the waterproofing of the station had been compromised. Construction began in 2010, with renovation of electrical, mechanical and structural components including waterproofing the underground roof and upgrades to fire protection and ventilation systems. The work also included improvements to lighting, refurbishment of staircases, new architectural facings including wall tiling and ceilings, rearranging of corridors to the Orange and Green line platforms, as well as refurbishment and renovation of the entrance buildings.

The renovation and upgrade works were planned for completion in 2025, however media reported in April 2024 that the work was significantly behind schedule. Estimated completion of the waterproofing works is now "around 2027 to 2029".

==== Accessibility ====
Alongside the renovation work, the station has been made partially accessible through the addition of elevators. In September 2009, two elevators connect the Orange Line platforms to the mezzanine, with an elevator connecting the street to the mezzanine opening in 2010. In November 2020, work to make the Green Line platforms accessible was completed, with the opening of two additional elevators. As of 2023, construction to provide elevators to the Yellow Line is underway, despite the technical challenge of excavating and building new elevators 28 metres (92 ft) below street level.

Upon completion of the works, the station will have seven elevators allowing step-free access to all three lines, as well as to the street.

== Overview ==
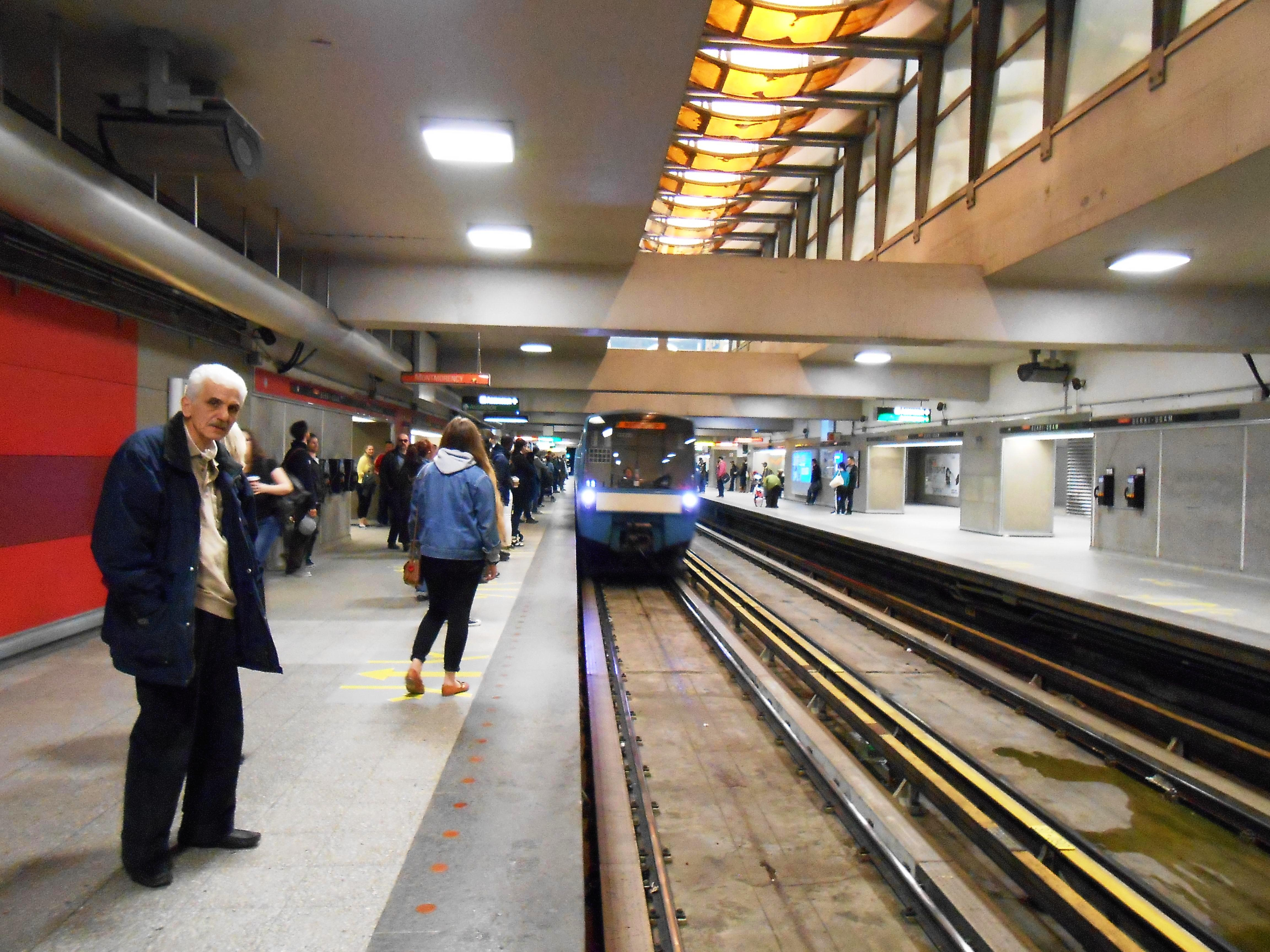
Line 2 platform

Line 1 platform

Line 4 platform

Station escalator and lift

Designed by Longpré and Marchand, the station serves three lines: the Green, Orange, and Yellow Lines.

The main part of the station is a cruciform cut and cover volume built underneath the intersection of rue Berri and boulevard de Maisonneuve; the volume is so large that the station's design had to include massive pillars to support the street.

This central volume contains three levels. The upper level contains the rectangular mezzanine at its centre, with fare gates on all four sides; the arms extend out to the station's entrances, with two more entrances at the crossing, and are also lined with shops and services. Staircases lead from the mezzanine to the landings on either side of the Orange Line. These landings provide views of the great volumes over the Green Line platforms below.

From the Green Line level, escalators and hallways connect the rest of the station to the Yellow Line terminus, built in a tunnel a block away under rue Saint-Denis, around 28 metres (92 ft) below the surface. Limited space in the Yellow Line tail tracks cause trains to reverse both in the tail tracks and in the foretracks when they leave the station.

All three lines have side platforms. The station was the first to be equipped with the MétroVision information screens, which displays news, commercials, and the time until the next train arrives.

The mezzanine can be accessed from the street via elevators in the Grande Bibliothèque du Québec and UQAM's Pavillon Judith-Jasmin; but those buildings are closed during some of the Metro's operating hours. However, there is an elevator in the Saint-Denis exit, which opened in June 2010 and is open throughout the operating hours.

The station has 5 entrances:

- Entrance A: 1500 Rue Berri
- Entrance B: 505 Rue Sainte-Catherine Est
- Entrance C: 850 Boulevard de Maisonneuve Est
- Entrance D: 1470 Rue Saint-Denis
- 1621 Rue Berri (no letter assigned)
- Place Dupuis (in food court 7 am-7pm)

== Station layout ==
G	Street Level	Entrance/exit (Elevators at boul. de Maisonneuve, at intersection of rue Berri and rue Sainte-Catherine, and at rue Saint-Denis)
B1	Upper mezzanine	Faregates, ticket machines, station agent, Elevators to Green and Orange Line platforms (Note: Yellow Line platforms are not accessible)
B2; Orange Line platforms	Side platform, doors will open on the right
B2; Orange Line platforms	Eastbound	← Orange Line to Montmorency (Sherbrooke)
B2; Orange Line platforms	Westbound	Orange Line to Côte-Vertu (Champ-de-Mars) →
B2; Orange Line platforms	Side platform, doors will open on the right
B3; Green Line platforms	Side platform, doors will open on the right
B3; Green Line platforms	Westbound	← Green Line to Angrignon (Saint-Laurent)
B3; Green Line platforms	Eastbound	Green Line to Honoré-Beaugrand (Beaudry) →
B3; Green Line platforms	Side platform, doors will open on the right
B4	Transfer mezzanine	Interchange corridor between Green Line and Yellow Line platforms
B5; Yellow Line platforms	Side platform, doors will open on the right
B5; Yellow Line platforms	Terminus	← Yellow Line terminus platform
B5; Yellow Line platforms	Eastbound	Yellow Line to Longueuil (Jean-Drapeau) →
B5; Yellow Line platforms	Side platform, doors will open on the right

== Architecture and art ==
Station concourse

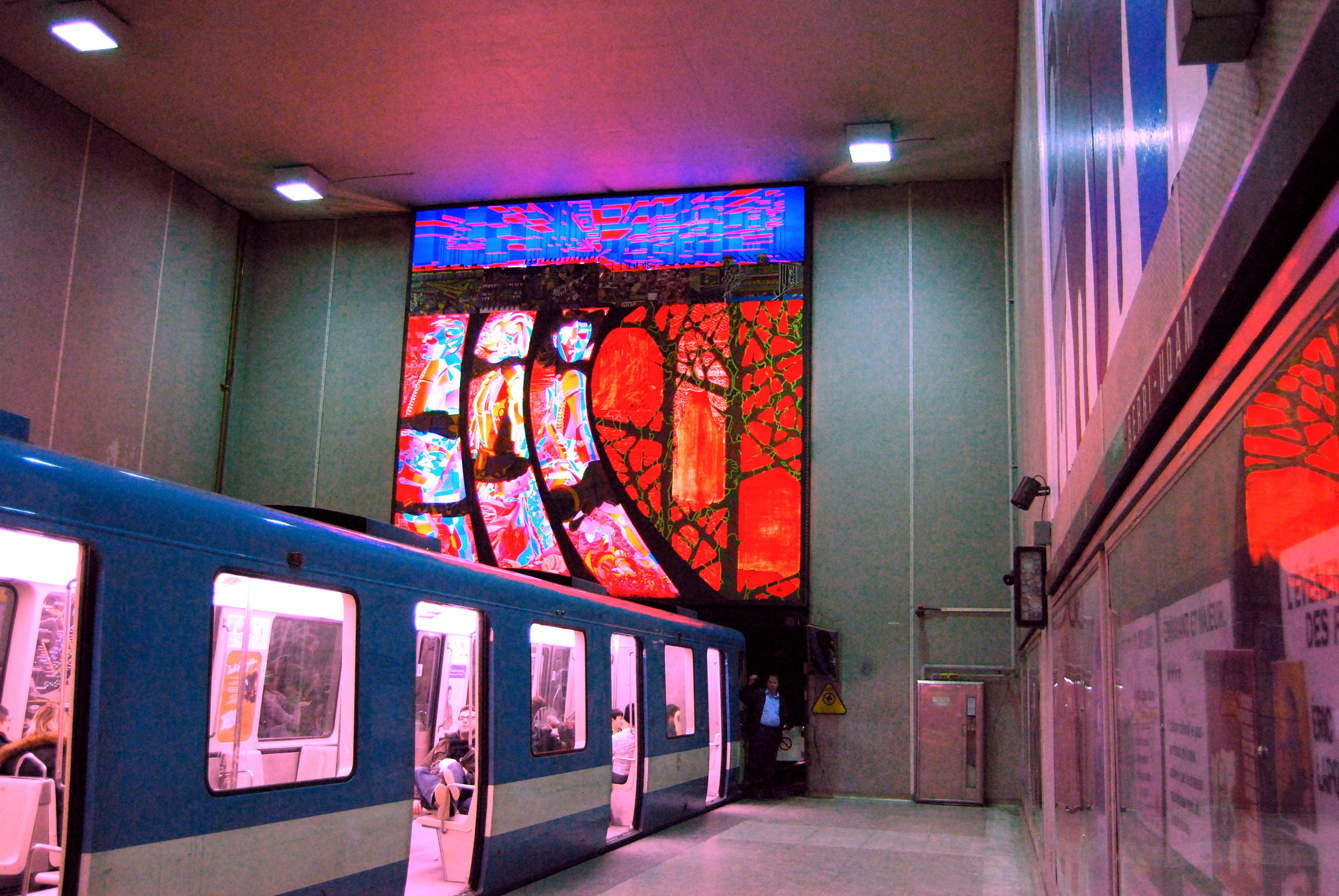
The Hommage aux fondateurs de la ville de Montréal mural

The station has a total of four independent exits: three integrated into buildings (the Berri, Saint-Denis, and Place Dupuis exits) and one free-standing kiosk (the Sainte-Catherine exit). The station also contains several underground city connections, listed below.

The 1967 station was designed by Longpré et Marchand, with a 1999 free-standing kiosk entrance designed by architect Gaétan Pelletier.

=== Artwork ===
The work of five artists is exhibited in this station. The largest work is a stained-glass mural by Pierre Gaboriau and Pierre Osterrath entitled Hommage aux fondateurs de la ville de Montréal (homage to the founders of the city of Montreal). A gift of the Union régionale de Montréal des caisses populaires Desjardins and installed in 1969, it depicts Jérôme le Royer de la Dauversière, Jeanne Mance, and Paul Chomedey, sieur de Maisonneuve. It is located over the eastern portal of the Green Line tunnel.

Three paintings by Robert LaPalme are located over the main staircase leading to the Yellow Line terminus. Originally located at the entrance to Expo 67, they represent three themes of the Expo: science, recreation, and culture.

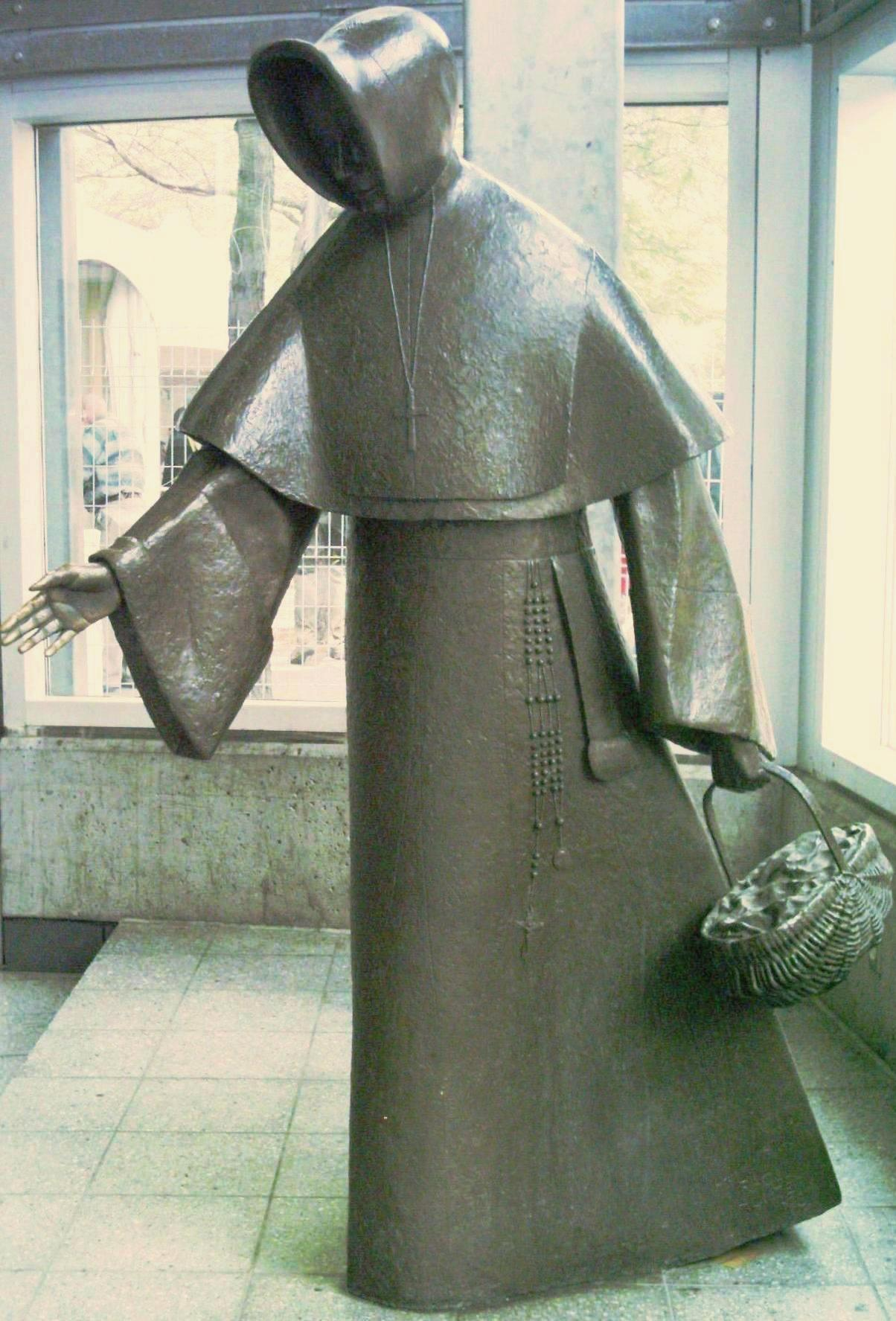
Mère Émilie Gamelin by Raoul Hunter

A plaque by LaPalme and Georges Lauda, commemorating the inauguration of the Metro, is located at the centre of the mezzanine. It is enclosed in a black circular bench, a popular meeting site, referred to as la rondelle (the hockey puck) or la pilule (the pill) or "le banc des fous" (the crazy bench).

In the newer Sainte-Catherine entrance pavilion, a statue of Mother Émilie Gamelin by Raoul Hunter, commemorating Place Émilie-Gamelin (also called Berri Square) in which the entrance is located. The statue is owned by the City of Montreal.

The most recent art piece put in place inside the station is the Wall of Peace on the concourse level of the Yellow Line. It consists of coloured metal plates bearing the word "peace" in multiple languages.

== Origin of the name ==
Berri–UQAM is named for both Berri Street, so called since 1663, and for the Université du Québec à Montréal. The university has taken to using UQAM as its abbreviation, which it displays as UQÀM (with a grave accent over the A as its logo; the station retains the UQAM form).

Until 1988, the station was named Berri–De Montigny; rue de Montigny is the former name of boulevard de Maisonneuve in this area. Small stubs of de Montigny street still survive in Downtown Montreal between Saint Laurent Boulevard and Saint Urbain Street and in the Montréal-Est suburb.

== Connections ==
The station is served by several STM bus routes. Gare d'autocars de Montréal, Montreal's main intercity bus terminal, is located close to the station.

Société de transport de Montréal
No.	Route	Connects to	Service times / notes
50	Vieux-Montréal / Vieux-Port	Gare d'autocars de Montréal; Square-Victoria-OACI; Peel	Daily
361 ☾	Saint-Denis	Replaces the Orange Line from Henri-Bourassa to Place-d'Armes	Night service
747 ✈	YUL Airport / Downtown	Gare d'autocars de Montréal; Bonaventure; Gare Centrale; Terminus Centre-ville; Lucien-L'Allier; Lionel-Groulx	Daily Some runs start or end at Lionel-Groulx Metro Station

== Nearby points of interest ==
=== Connected via the underground city ===
- Université du Québec à Montréal
- Gare d'autocars de Montréal
- Grande Bibliothèque

=== Other ===
- Quartier Latin
- Cégep du Vieux Montréal
- Hôpital Saint-Luc du CHUM
- Cinémathèque québécoise
- National Film Board of Canada
- Place Émilie-Gamelin ("Berri Square")
- Théâtre Saint-Denis
- Cinéma du Quartier-Latin
- Service Canada
- Métropolis
