= Théâtre Saint-Denis =

Coordinates: 45.5146°N 73.5628°W

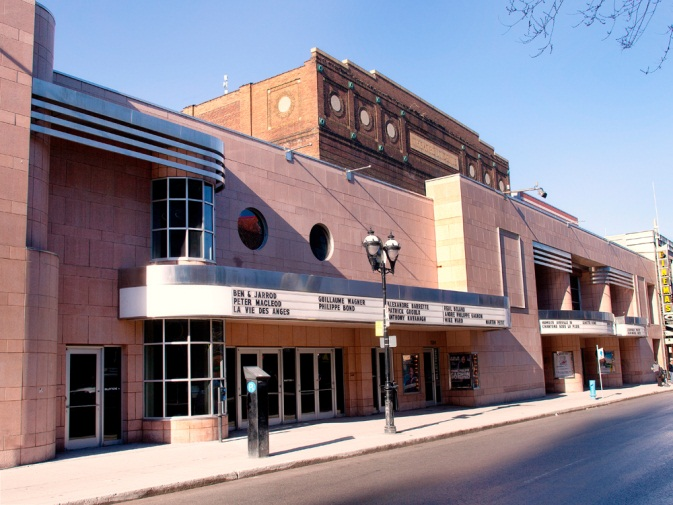
Théâtre St-Denis, 2012

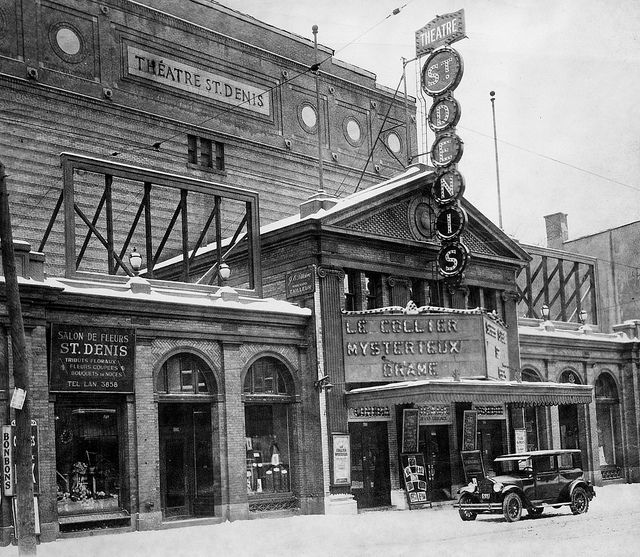
Théâtre Saint-Denis, circa 1925

Théâtre Saint-Denis (French pronunciation: [teɑtʁ sɛ̃ dəni]) is a theatre located on Saint Denis Street in Montreal, Quebec, in the city's Quartier Latin.

A movie theatre built in 1915 by Anglin-Norcross Ltd., the Théâtre Saint-Denis' mission changed in the 1980s and has since focused exclusively on performing arts. It hosts musicals, plays, music concerts and numerous stand-up comedy shows during the Just for Laughs festival.

The theatre contains two halls, Théâtre St-Denis 1 and Théâtre St-Denis 2. Théâtre St-Denis 1 has 2,218 seats (1,328 on the floor, and 890 on the balcony) and Théâtre St-Denis 2 has 933 seats (665 on the floor, and 268 on the balcony).

On May 10, 2016, the borough of Ville Marie announced that the theatre would be renovated with a new facade that will expose more of historic theatre design.
