= Sisters of Providence (Montreal) =

Catholic institute in Quebec, Canada

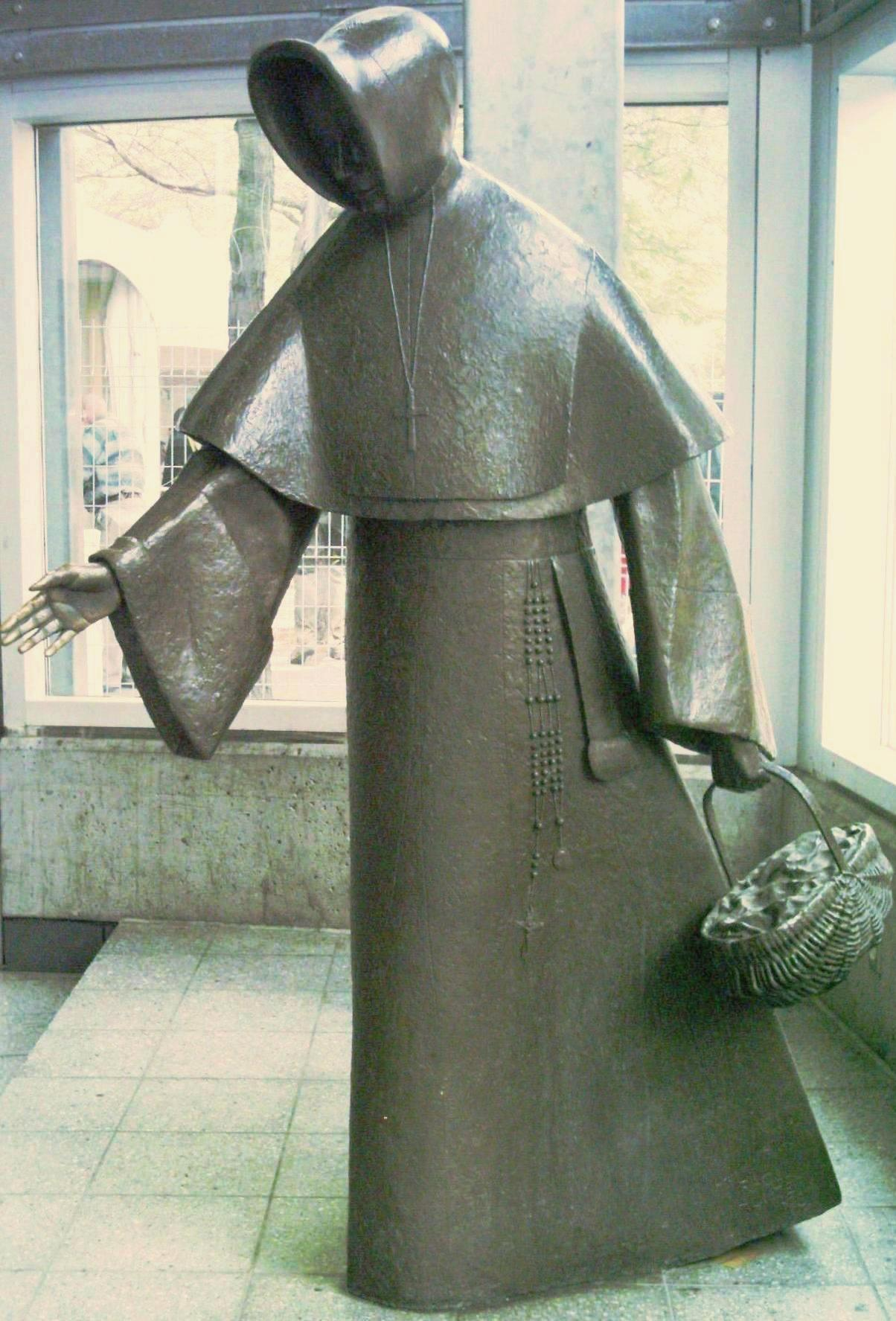
Émilie Gamelin, sculpture by Raoul Hunter

The Sisters of Providence are a Catholic religious institute founded in 1843 by Émilie Gamelin. They are headquartered in Montreal, Quebec, with five provinces: Mother Joseph Province, Holy Angels Province, Philippines Vice-Province, Émilie-Gamelin Province and Bernarda Morin Province.

== History ==
The community of Sisters of Providence or more accurately, "Daughters of Charity, Servants of the Poor", was founded in Montreal, Canada, by Bishop Ignace Bourget and Madame Jean Baptiste Gamelin (Marie Emélie Eugénie Tavernier), 25 March 1843. After the deaths of her husband and three children, Madame Gamelin developed a particular devotion to Our Lady of Sorrows, whose commemoration remains the congregation's principal feast.

With the approbation of the religious and civil authorities Madame Gamelin, a childless widow, had for some time been sheltering in her own house a number of infirm and poor old women. In 1836, Émilie and her 24 charges moved to a larger home, the “Yellow House.” This new home came to be called "Providence House".

After a voyage to Europe, Bishop Bourget wished to bring to Montreal some French Sisters of Charity, but the plan came to nothing, and he decided to appeal to the young women of his own diocese. On 25 March 1843, in the chapel of the first asylum in Montreal seven sisters received the religious habit at his hands. Gamelin became the first Superior of the Congregation. The new institution developed rapidly. Its object is to provide for the poor and sick spiritual and temporal relief, to shelter children and the aged, to visit the homes of the poor and the ill, to shelter the infirm and the homeless, to maintain dispensaries for the needy, and to instruct the young. They opened a shelter for Irish orphans of typhus and took charge of a school for girls.

In 1854, at the invitation of Louis de Goesbriand, Bishop of Burlington, the sisters opened St. Joseph Orphanage. In 1856 Augustin-Magloire Blanchet, the bishop of the new Diocese of Nesqually, approached the Sisters of Providence in Montreal, seeking their assistance for his diocese in the Pacific Northwest Territories of the United States. Joseph Pariseau was chosen to lead four companions as missionaries to that region. Accompanied by the bishop, they spent over a month traveling by train and ship from Montreal, arriving on the 8 December of that year. They settled in Vancouver, Washington and established a convent-school and shortly thereafter St. Joseph Hospital, which would develop into PeaceHealth Southwest Medical Center. She went on to design and build more than 30 hospitals, schools, orphanages and libraries across British Columbia, Washington, Montana, Idaho and Oregon. For her contributions to the development of that region, she was honored by the State of Washington as one of the two people allowed to represent it in the National Statuary Hall Collection in Washington, D.C.

The Sisters of Providence of Montreal were instrumental in helping to establish:

- The Sisters of Providence of St. Vincent de Paul in Kingston, Ontario (Canada) (1861)
- The Sisters of Our Lady of Seven Dolors (1887)

The rule of the Institute of Providence was definitively approved by Leo XIII 12 September 1900.

== Present day ==
"We believe that the loving presence of God watches over the entire universe and remains attentive to the needs of all, active in us and through us. This is what we call Providence." The congregation is a member of the Women of Providence in Collaboration.

Providence Health & Services was established by the Sisters.

The Museum of the Sisters of Providence was open in 1996. Located in the Providence International Centre, it presents the history of Emilie Gamelin and of the Sisters of Providence.

== See also ==
- Place Émilie-Gamelin
