= Hôpital Saint-Luc =

Hospital in Montreal, Canada

- Centre hospitalier de l’Université de Montréal
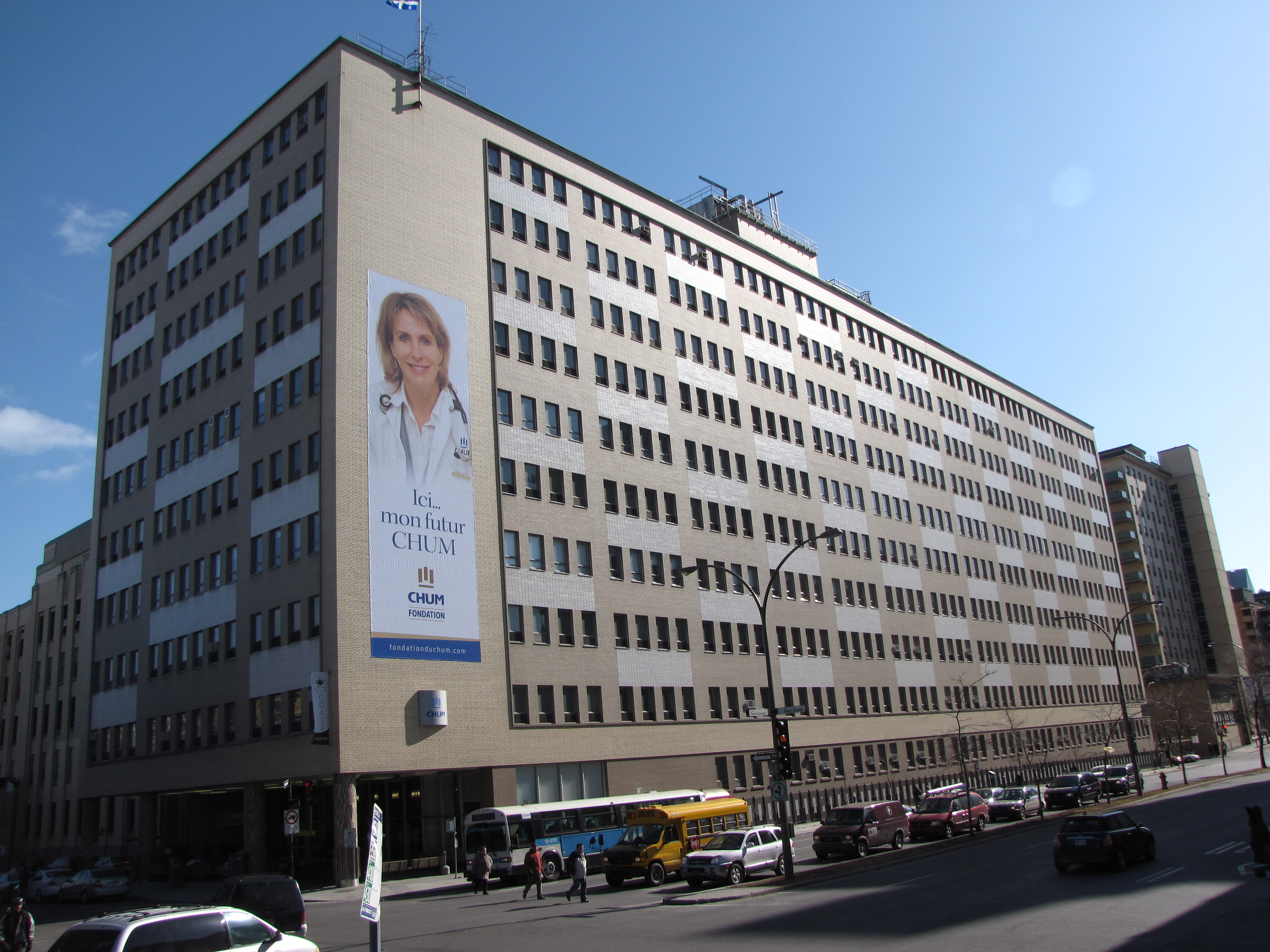
- View in 2009 from Saint Denis Street

- Location in Montreal

Geography
- Location: 1058, rue Saint-Denis, Montreal, Quebec, Canada
- Coordinates: 45.512°N 73.558°W

Organization
- Care system: RAMQ (Quebec medicare)
- Type: Teaching
- Affiliated university: Université de Montréal Faculty of Medicine
- Network: Centre hospitalier de l'Université de Montréal

History
- Founded: 1908
- Closed: 8 October 2017

Links
- Lists: Hospitals in Canada

Hôpital Saint-Luc was a hospital in Montreal, Quebec, Canada, at the intersection of Saint Denis Street and René Lévesque Boulevard in the borough of Ville-Marie. It was named in honor of Luke the Evangelist, who is the patron saint of doctors in the Roman Catholic religion.

== History ==
Hôpital Saint-Luc was founded in 1908 by Dr. F.A. Fleury in a private home at 88 Saint Denis Street, Montreal.

The hospital was located in the poorest neighborhood of Montreal. The founder, Dr. F. A. Fleury wanted to treat children in need. Hôpital Saint-Luc had a mission to accept, without any discrimination, any person requiring care.

In 1912, hospital officials required the assistance of the City of Montreal to pay the salaries of its dentists. During the years of Great Depression following the 1929 stock market crash, agreements with the city provided a number of beds to be constantly available to the homeless patients collected by the police in addition to both domestic and foreign sailors from the Port of Montreal. In exchange, the city and the Government of Canada compensated the hospital for each visit or hospitalization. These new modes of cooperation were precursors to universal access to medical care.

Hôpital Saint-Luc was notably the first hospital to offer 24-hour emergency services regardless of ethnic, linguistic or religious identity. The hospital was specialized since its founding in the fields of Otolaryngology, Ophthalmology, dentistry and clinical venereal disease.

Over the years, the need for hospitalization become increasingly urgent. In 1928 the small hospital was inaugurated, increasing the capacity from 9 to 89 beds. A chain of successive expansions took place thereafter, allowing Hôpital Saint-Luc to offer a total of 814 beds.

On October 1, 1996, Hôpital Saint-Luc signed a memorandum of understanding that made it one of the three hospitals belonging to the Centre hospitalier de l’Université de Montréal (CHUM) network.

In March 2005, construction of the CHUM megahospital was announced to be located on 1000 Saint-Denis on a site adjacent to Hôpital Saint-Luc. The megahospital was opened to patients on October 8, 2017; on the same date, the last remaining inpatients at Hôpital Saint-Luc were transferred to the CHUM, and Saint-Luc was closed. The building was to be demolished and replaced with an additional wing of the CHUM. The demolition is slated to be completed by July 2018.

In addition to its main facility, Hôpital Saint-Luc had two secondary buildings in Pavillon Roland-Buck and Pavillon Edouard-Asselin. Pavillon Roland-Buck was demolished in 2011 and replaced by a segment of the new megahospital. Pavillon Edouard-Asselin is still in operation and is expected to be returned to the Government of Quebec at some point in the future.

== See also ==
- Centre hospitalier de l'Université de Montréal
