= Saint Denis Street =

Thoroughfare in Montreal, Canada

Coordinates: 45°30′51″N 73°33′40″W

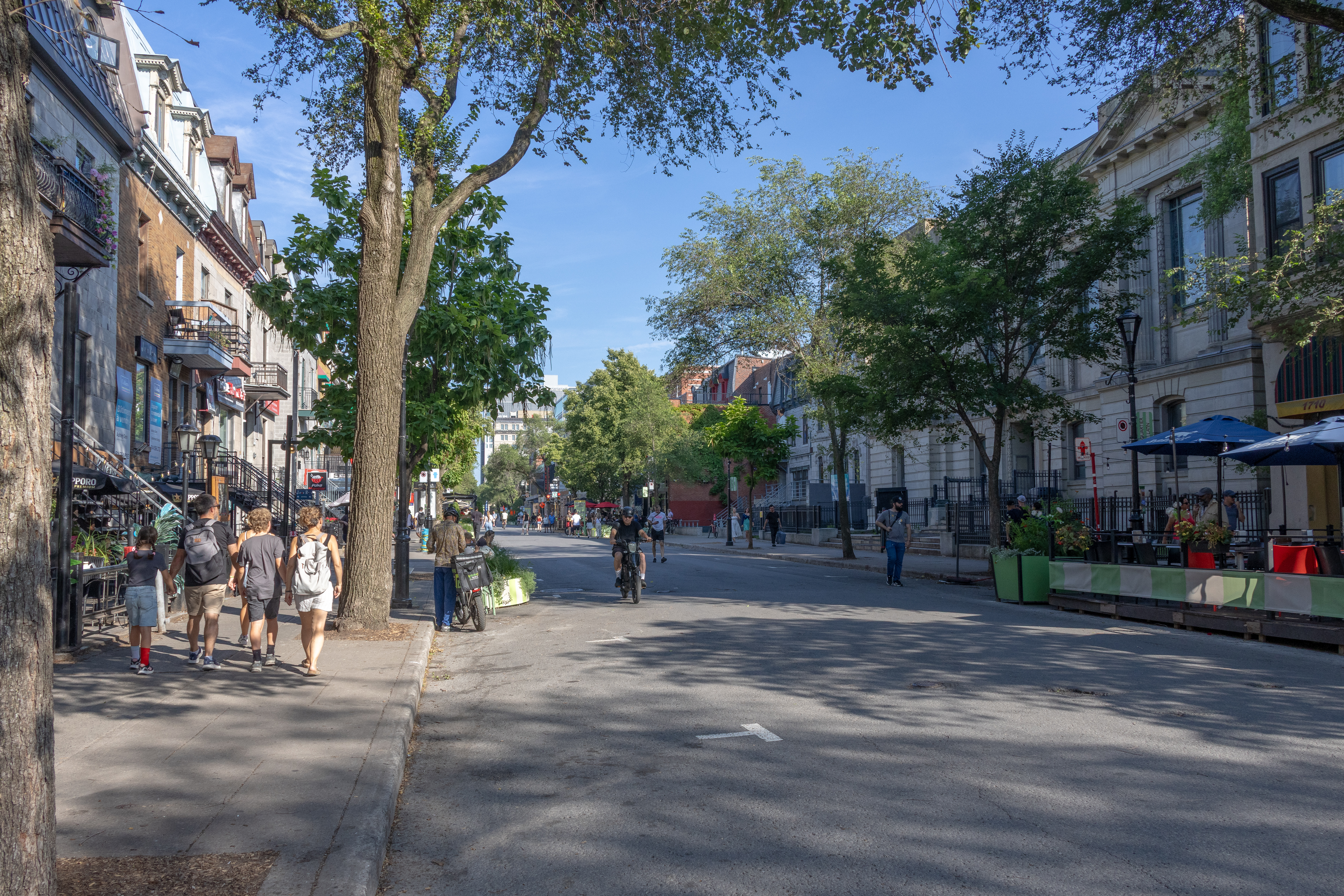
- Saint Denis Street in the Quartier Latin
- Interactive map of Saint Denis Street
- Native name: Rue Saint Denis (French)
- Former name(s): Rue Albert, rue Fénélon, rue Berri
- Part of: R-335
- Length: 11 km (6.8 mi)
- Location: Montreal
- South end: Saint-Antoine Street, Old Montreal
- Major junctions: A-40 (TCH); R-138
- North end: Rue Sommerville, Ahuntsic

Construction
- Inauguration: 1818

Saint Denis Street (officially in French: Rue Saint-Denis) is a major east-west thoroughfare in Montreal, Quebec.

It extends from the Notre-Dame-de-Bon-Secours Chapel on Saint Paul Street in Old Montreal to the bank of the Rivière des Prairies at the north end of the island. It is designated Route 335 from Sherbrooke Street to the Metropolitan Expressway, and is known as Bonsecours Street south of Saint Antoine Street. Along its length, it passes through the boroughs of Ville-Marie, Le Plateau-Mont-Royal, Rosemont–La Petite-Patrie, Villeray–Saint-Michel–Parc-Extension, and Ahuntsic-Cartierville.

Saint-Denis serves as one of the primary thoroughfares of both the Latin Quarter, where it plays host to a number of bars and restaurants, to the Plateau Mont-Royal, where it is known as one of the best places to view Montreal's distinct style of architecture. It becomes primarily a residential street north of the Metropolitan Expressway. Sauvé train station is located on the street but not the metro station itself. The eastern portion of the Montreal Metro's Orange Line runs parallel to the street, two blocks to the east except for Berri–UQAM station which has an entrance on the street. Rosemont station is located on Saint Denis street but doesn’t have an entrance to the street.

It is named for Saint Denis of Paris.

== Route description ==
South of the Ville-Marie Expressway, the street crosses Old Montreal and is named rue Bonsecours. North of the Ville-Marie Expressway, it becomes Saint Denis Street and crosses the Quartier Latin. In the Quartier Latin, its vocation is primarily touristic and leisure-related, with restaurants and theatres located along this stretch. Near Saint Catherine Street, it crosses the downtown Université du Québec à Montréal (UQAM) campus while a little further north, it borders the Cégep du Vieux Montréal.

North of Sherbrooke Street, Saint Denis Street enters the borough of Le Plateau Mont-Royal. In the Plateau-Mont-Royal and Rosemont-La Petite-Patrie to the north, it is a commercial street lined with small stores. Parallel streets are mostly residential. To the west, Saint Laurent Boulevard also serves a commercial purpose.

In the boroughs of Villeray-Saint-Michel-Parc-Extension and Ahuntsic-Cartierville, Saint Denis Street is mainly residential. However, several businesses including green grocers and Vietnamese restaurants are located on the street. It is also one of the gateways to the Metropolitan Expressway. North of Crémazie Boulevard, it is a one-way northbound street with little traffic since the northbound Highway 335 continues along the Lajeunesse Street and Berri Street.

== History ==
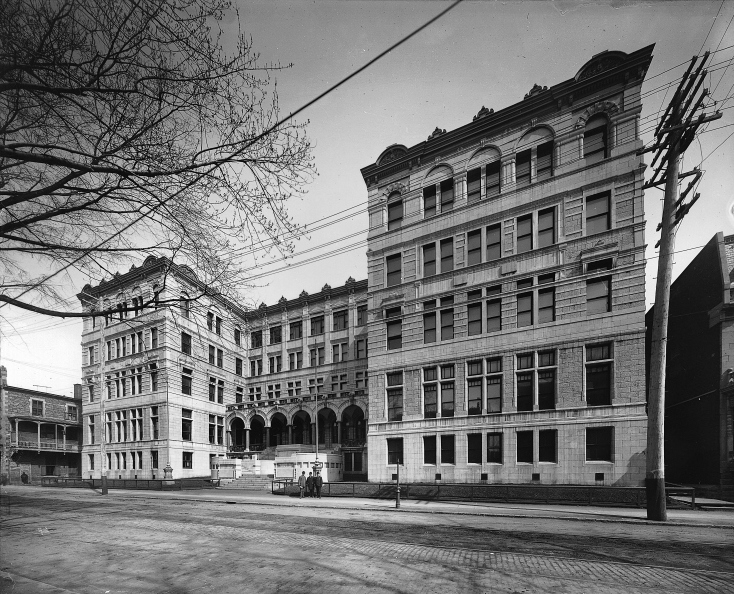
Université Laval à Montréal in 1903

Saint Denis Street opened in the early nineteenth century on land acquired by Louis-Joseph Papineau (1786−1871) and his aunt Perine Charles Cherrier, widow of Denis Viger (1741−1805).

Extended several times, Saint Denis Street developed gradually after the construction of Saint Jacques Cathedral in 1836, facing Place Pasteur. Subsequently, it reached Sherbrooke Street near the end of the 19th century. During the mid-nineteenth century, this tree-lined residential street was inhabited by several representatives of the French Canadian elite. Before the end of the century, it began to transform into a commercial street, ascending slowly northward.

In the early 20th century, the section of the Saint Denis Street between Dorchester Street (now René Lévesque Boulevard) and Sherbrooke Street became the centre of a francophone intellectual elite. Located in the area were the Université Laval à Montréal (current site of Le pavillon Hubert-Aquin de l’UQÀM), the École Polytechnique de Montréal, the Saint-Sulpice Library and many bookstores. It was deserted by academics following the relocation of Université of Montreal and École Polytechnique on the northern slope of Mount Royal. From the late 1970s, the academic character of the neighbourhood returned with the construction of pavilions for the Université du Québec à Montréal, around the steeple of the old Saint Jacques Cathedral.

== See also ==
- Louis-Hippolyte Lafontaine who lived on Saint Denis Street
