= Osterrath =

Osterrath is the family name of a stained glass workshop operating from Tilff, Belgium beginning in the final part of the 19th century. Their works were in the neo-Gothic style of the period and samples or their works can be seen in cathedrals in Liège, Belgium, and in many religious constructions in surrounding cities in Europe. Stained glass panels meant for religious buildings were sent as far as the United States and Canada.

Following World War II, the workshop eventually moved to Cowansville, Quebec, Canada and became one of the main suppliers of stained-glass panels for churches being built in southern Quebec. Stained glass Panels produced by this workshop were sent to different cities and provinces in Canada such as Montreal, Hull and New Brunswick.

Pierre Osterrath followed on to become a renowned glass artist in Quebec and led in the creation of large stained glass panels on display in the Montreal metro system such as the ones found at the Berri–UQAM, Charlevoix, and Du Collège stations.

The Musée des arts religieux et mosans in Liège holds further documentation of the family's creations.

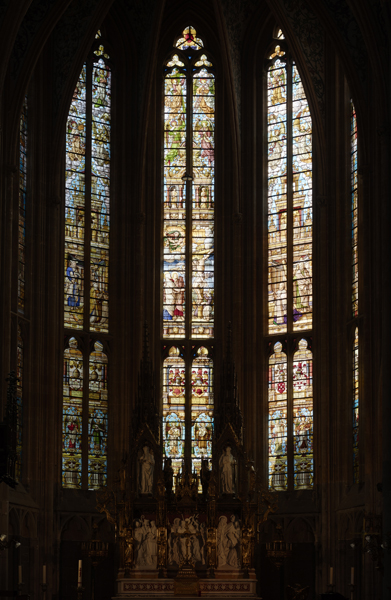
Liège

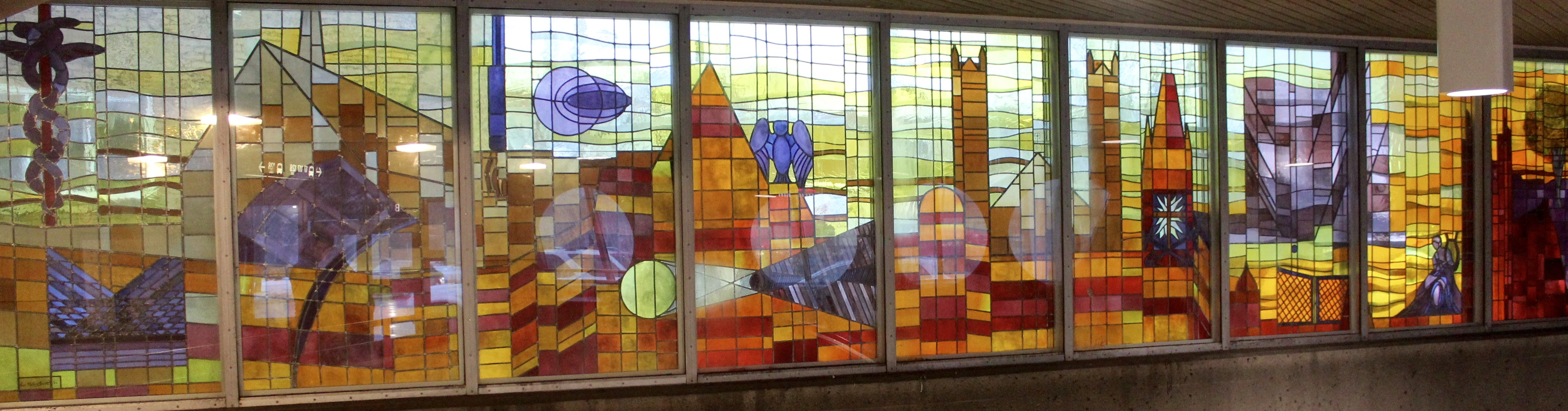
Du Collège (Montreal Metro)

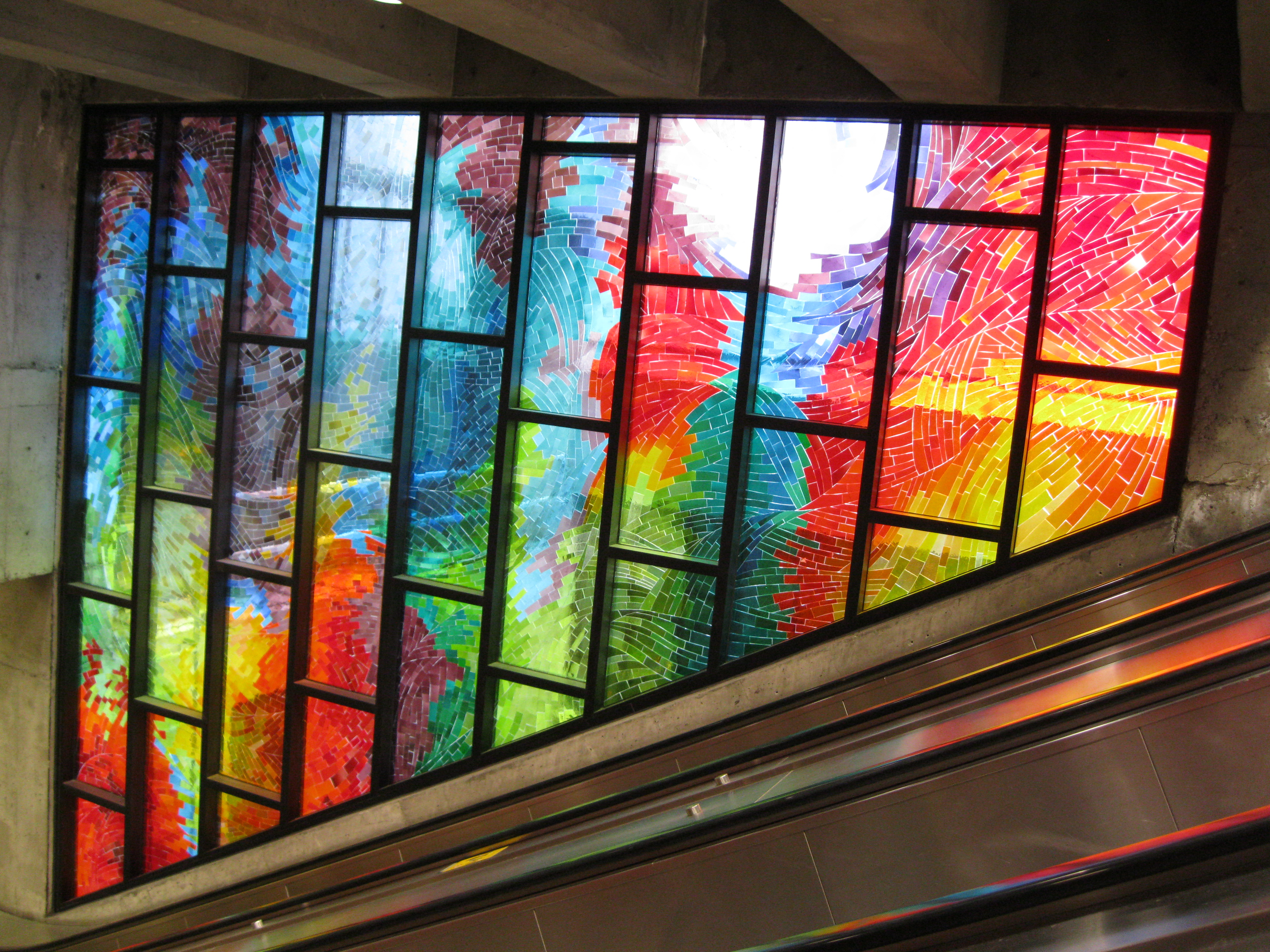
Metro Charlevoix
