= Émilie Gamelin =

Canadian social worker and Catholic sister (1800–1851)

Blessed Émilie Gamelin SP
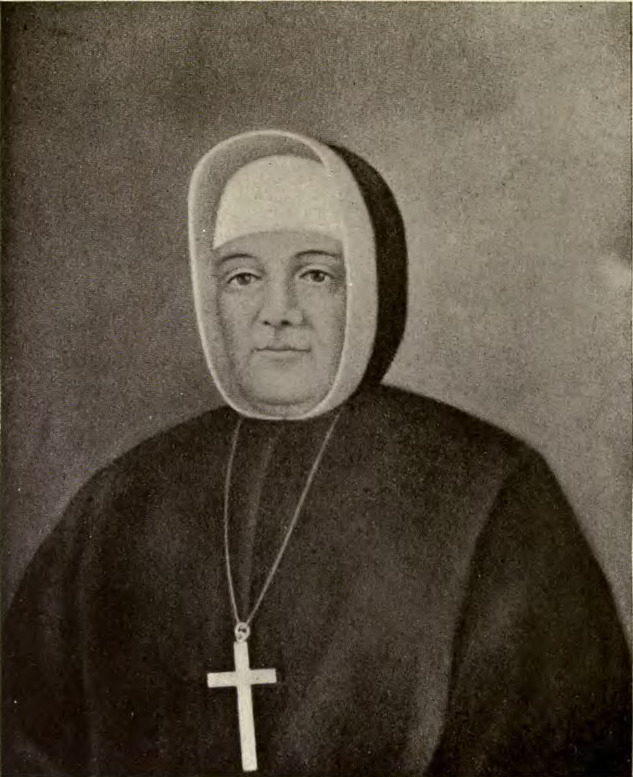
- Born: Marie-Émilie-Eugène Tavernier; 19 February 1800; Montreal, Lower Canada
- Died: 23 September 1851 (aged 51); Montreal, Province of Canada
- Beatified: 7 October 2001, Rome, by Pope John Paul II
- Feast: 23 September / 24 September (Canada)

Émilie Tavernier Gamelin SP (19 February 1800 – 23 September 1851) was a Canadian Catholic social worker and religious sister best known as the founder of the Sisters of Providence of Montreal. In 2001, she was beatified by Pope John Paul II.

== Early life ==
She was born Marie-Émilie-Eugène Tavernier (also known as Amélie) on 19 February 1800 in Montreal, the youngest of the 15 children of Antoine Tavernier and Marie-Josephe Maurice. Nine of her siblings died before reaching adulthood. Gamelin's mother died in 1804 when Gamelin was aged 4 and her father died in 1814 when Gamelin was aged 14. Consequently, Gamelin was raised by her aunt Marie-Anne Tavernier and her husband Joseph Perrault, to whose care Gamelin's mother had entrusted Émilie prior to her death. Gamelin shared the Perrault household with her aunt and uncle and their four children.

From 1814 to 1815, Gamelin boarded at the school run by the Sisters of the Congregation of Notre Dame, before returning to the Perrault household. In 1818 Gamelin moved to the house of her brother François, whose wife had recently died, to care for him. When she returned to the Perrault household in 1819, her aunt, now old and infirm, put Émilie under the care of her daughter Agathe (born 1787), who became a third mother to her.

At the age of 19, while caring for her aunt, Gamelin spent time as a debutante in Montreal fashionable society and was frequently seen at the social events of the city. Between 1820 and 1822 Gamelin spent two stretches residing with one of her cousins, Julie Perrault, in Quebec City, ending in 1822 when Gamelin's aunt, Marie-Anne, died, resulting in Gamelin and her cousin Agathe Perrault moving together into a house in Montreal West. In a letter to Agathe dated 18 June 1822, Gamelin wrote that she felt "a strong vocation [...] for the convent. [...] I renounce for ever the young dandies and also the [vanities of this] world; I shall become a religious some time in the autumn."

Despite her interest in consecrated life, on 4 June 1823, Marie-Émilie' who was 23 at the time, married Jean-Baptiste Gamelin, a fifty-year-old bachelor of Montreal who made a living dealing in apples. The marriage lasted four years ending with Jean-Baptiste's death on 1 October 1827. Gamelin had three children by the marriage: two died shortly after birth and the third died within a year of her husband.

== Charitable works ==
After the death of her husband, to assuage her grief, Gamelin took part in charitable works. In 1827 she was guided by her spiritual director, Jean-Baptiste Bréguier dit Saint-Pierre, to pray to Our Lady of Seven Dolors and to join two groups organized by the Sulpician Fathers. These groups were the Confraternity of the Public Good, which arranged work for the unemployed, and the Ladies of Charity, a group aimed at relieving poverty and destitution through home visits and the distribution of alms. In 1828 she also joined the Confraternity of the Holy Family, a group dedicated to the spiritual growth of its members and the spreading of the Roman Catholic faith. For a short period in 1829 she also worked with Agathe-Henriette Huguet-Latour's organization, the Charitable Institution for Female Penitents. While working with these groups, Gamelin gradually divested herself of her financial assets, funnelling the proceeds into the charities with which she was working.

From her home visits, the young widow had been struck by the misery in which single and isolated elderly women lived. As a result, in 1829, Gamelin took four of these frail and sick elderly women into her own home on the Rue Saint-Antoine. By 1830 she had decided that larger premises were needed to care for them, and on 4 March 1830 she opened a shelter for frail or sick elderly women in Montreal on the corner of Rue Saint-Laurent and Rue Sainte-Catherine, in the Saint Lawrence district, near the homes of many of her relatives. The building for the shelter was provided by the Abbé Claude Fay, parish priest of the Church of Notre-Dame in Montreal. In 1831, the shelter moved to a larger building rented by Gamelin at the corner of Rue Saint-Lawrence and Rue Saint-Philippe. At the time of the move, the new building housed 15 boarders, with a maximum capacity of 20, and also provided a residence for Gamelin. The shelter expanded until in 1836, it again required larger premises. On 14 March 1836, a house on the corner of Rue Sainte-Catherine and Rue Lacroix was donated by Antoine-Olivier Berthelet, a wealthy philanthropist, and shortly thereafter the shelter moved to these new premises, called the "Yellow House". By this time, Gamelin had 24 women as her co-workers in her work.

In March 1838, Gamelin contracted typhoid fever and became seriously ill; however, she later recovered.

== Political beliefs ==
During the years leading up to the Lower Canada Rebellion, Gamelin was a supporter of the Canadian Party, the forerunner of the Patriot Party. Her brother François Tavernier was an ardent supporter of Joseph Papineau and the Patriots, and during the 1832 Montreal West by-election he was arrested and charged with assaulting a supporter of Stanley Bagg, an opposing Tory politician. Gamelin's cousin Joseph Perrault had been elected to the Assembly as a member of the Canadian Party. In the 1832 by-election for Montreal West, Lower Canada, Gamelin was one of 226 women who sought to vote. She cast her vote for the Patriot candidate Daniel Tracey in preference to his Tory opponent Bagg.

During the Lower Canada Rebellion (1837–1839), Gamelin obtained permission to visit imprisoned rebels who were under sentences of death, and gave them counseling and helped them to contact their families.

== The House of Providence ==
In May 1841, Ignace Bourget, the newly appointed Bishop of Montreal, travelled to Europe, where he visited France. There, among other business, he attempted to persuade the Daughters of Charity of St. Vincent de Paul to come to Canada. He intended for the Daughters to take charge of Gamelin's Asylum to put it on a sound footing. In his absence, on 18 September 1841, the Legislative Assembly of the Province of Canada incorporated the shelter as the Montreal Asylum for Aged and Infirm Women.

Bourget announced this plan to Gamelin and her staff on 16 October 1841, shortly after his return from France. That same day, the women who formed the corporation voted to purchase land for a separate facility, to be known as the Asylum of Providence. On the following 27 October they elected the Widow Gamelin as Director of the corporation. On 6 November, the corporation bought land on a block bounded by Rue Sainte-Catherine, Rue Lacroix, and Rue Mignonne. Plans for a new facility were commissioned from architect John Ostell, and construction commenced on 20 December 1841. On 16 February 1842, Gamelin donated the last of her property to the corporation.

However, on 8 November 1842, Bishop Bourget received word that the Daughters of Charity had decided not to pursue a mission to Montreal. He therefore decided to found a new religious community to manage the asylum, and put out a call for suitable women to join such a group. By 25 March 1843, seven women had expressed an interest, and they were placed into a novitiate under the direction of Jean-Charles Prince, coadjutor bishop of Montreal. Gamelin was not one of those women, but Bourget was nevertheless eager to associate her with the project by permitting her to attend all spiritual exercises of the novices. On 8 July 1843, one of the novices withdrew from the program, leaving an opening which Gamelin was intended to take.

Prior to entering the novitiate, however, Gamelin was sent by Bourget to the United States to visit and study the Sisters of Charity of St. Joseph in Emmitsburg, Maryland, founded by Elizabeth Ann Seton in 1809, with the aim of obtaining a model for a new religious congregation. Gamelin returned with a handwritten copy of the Rule of St. Vincent de Paul, and on 8 October 1843, she took the religious habit of the new congregation as a novice.

== Sisters of Providence ==
On 29 March 1844, a ceremony was held at the chapel of the Asylum of Providence, in which Bourget conferred canonical status on the new religious congregation and named it the Daughters of Charity, Servants of the Poor (later to become popularly known as the Sisters of Charity of Providence; in 1970 the congregation officially was named the Sisters of Providence). At this ceremony, Gamelin and the other six novices became religious sisters, taking the traditional vows of chastity, poverty, and obedience as well as a fourth one of service to the poor. The following day (30 March) Gamelin was elected Superior General of the new congregation and was granted the title of Mother Gamelin.

From 1843, the Sisters provided shelter to orphan girls and elderly women boarders, and in 1844 they launched the Hospice St-Joseph, dedicated to the care and shelter of sick and elderly Catholic priests. Also in 1845, the Sisters established an employment office to aid job seekers and prospective employers. They also began caring for the mentally ill and opened a school at Longue-Pointe in Montreal. In 1846, they opened a shelter at La Prairie, Quebec.

In 1847 a typhus epidemic struck Montreal and Bishop Bourget called upon the religious communities of Montreal, including the Sisters of Providence, to aid in the treatment of its victims. Following the epidemic Gamelin assumed responsibility for the Hospice Saint-Jérôme-Émilien, a facility dedicated to the children of immigrant-Irish typhus victims. Late that year, Gamelin dispatched some of the Sisters to teach at the École Saint-Jacques, which was suffering from staff shortages. In 1849, she established the Hôpital Saint-Camille to help respond to that year's cholera epidemic.

In 1849 Gamelin successfully petitioned the Attorney General of Lower Canada, Louis-Hippolyte Lafontaine, for permission to open an insane asylum at Longue-Pointe. Also that year she established a convent at Sainte-Élisabeth, Quebec, and in 1850 it was joined by a convent at Sorel-Tracy, Quebec. Late in 1850 Gamelin again visited the United States and toured the establishments of the Sisters of Charity, with special attention to their lunatic asylums.

On 23 September 1851, exhausted by her labors, Gamelin died of cholera during an epidemic, following an illness that lasted less than 12 hours. Her last words were "Humility, simplicity, charity...above all chari...". She was buried the following day in the vault of the Asylum of Providence. At the time of her death, there were over 50 professed Sisters of the congregation and 19 novices caring for nearly a thousand women, children, and six elderly priests.

== Veneration ==
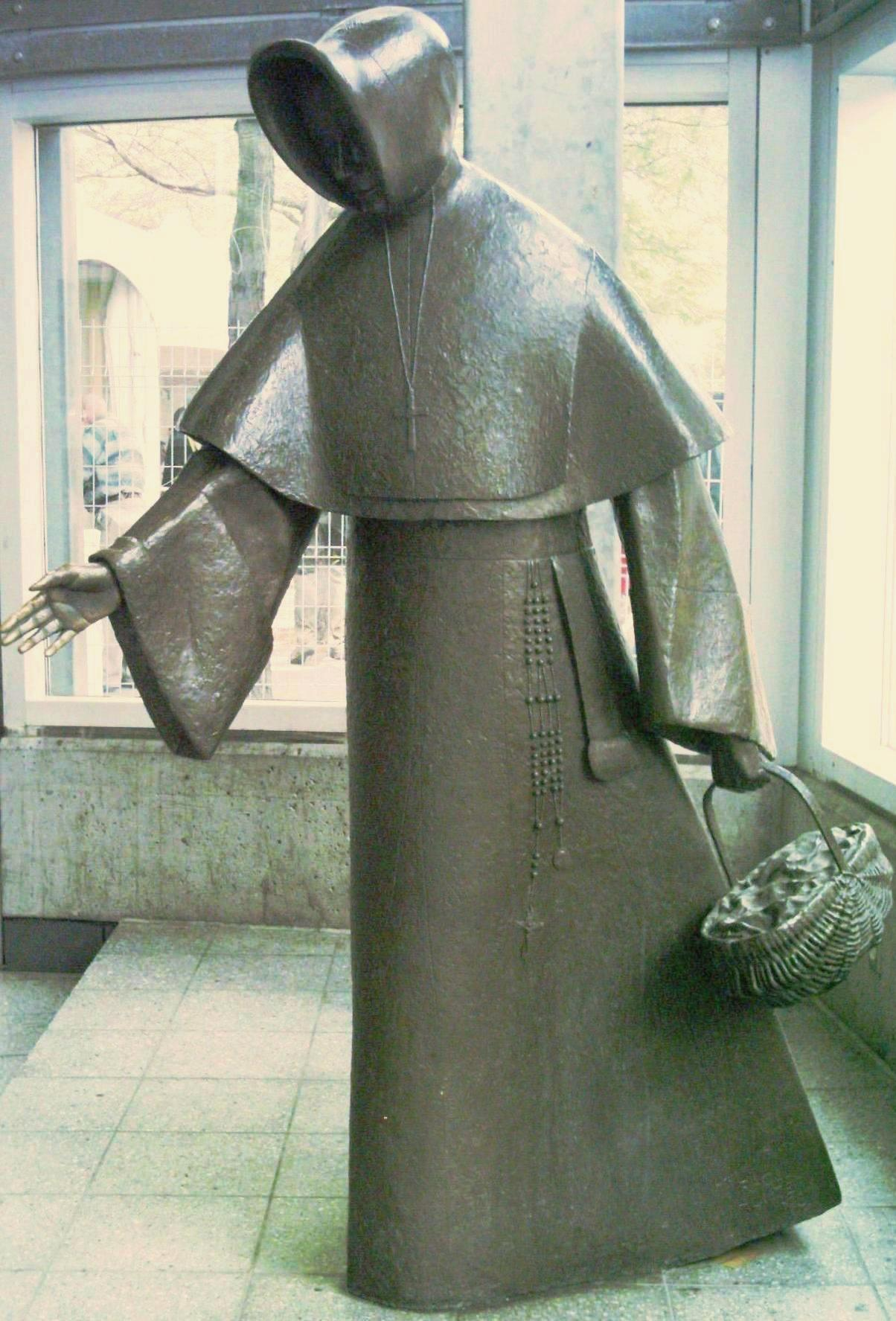
Statue by Raoul Hunter, 1999 (at Berri–UQAM station, Montreal, 2008)

In 1960, investigations were begun with the intention of starting the cause for Gamelin's possible beatification and canonization. On 31 May 1981, the inquiry was formally begun in the Archdiocese of Montreal, and Gamelin was thereby proclaimed a Servant of God.

In 1983, an inquiry into Gamelin's canonization cause was begun by a diocesan tribunal. The evidence heard by the tribunal was compiled into a document called a positio, which was sent to Rome and presented to the Congregation for the Causes of the Saints. The positio was examined by a committee of expert theologians and, upon their recommendation, Pope John Paul II declared Gamelin to be venerable on 23 December 1993.

Also in 1983, a 13-year-old boy named Yannick Fréchette was observed to make a surprising recovery from leukemia following prayer directed to Mother Émilie Gamelin. The medical file relating to this case was submitted to doctors in Rome, and in 1999 those doctors unanimously declared Fréchette's recovery to be a miracle, attributable to the intercession of Gamelin. The healing was formally acknowledged as a miracle by Pope John Paul II on 18 December 2000. On 7 October 2001 Pope John Paul II beatified her.

== Legacy ==
Today, the Sisters of Providence serve in 9 countries: Canada, the United States, Chile, the Philippines, Argentina, El Salvador, Cameroon, Haiti, and Egypt. The Providence Centre is located on Grenet Street in Montreal. It accommodates the General Administration of the congregation, the Centre Émilie-Gamelin and the Sisters of Providence Museums and the Archives.

The Asylum of Providence was demolished in 1963. Since 1995, this land (formally known as Square Berri) has been known as Place Émilie-Gamelin.

=== Statue ===
A 1999 bronze sculpture of Gamelin by Raoul Hunter is installed in the Saint Catherine Street exit of Montreal's Berri–UQAM station, in Quebec, Canada.

An identical bronze sculpture is installed in the vestibule of Providence Care Center in Calgary Alberta. Providence Care Center is part of the Father Lacombe Care Society which was founded by 4 Sisters of Providence in 1910 at the request of Father Albert Lacombe.
