= Dupuis Frères =

Department Store in Montreal, Canada

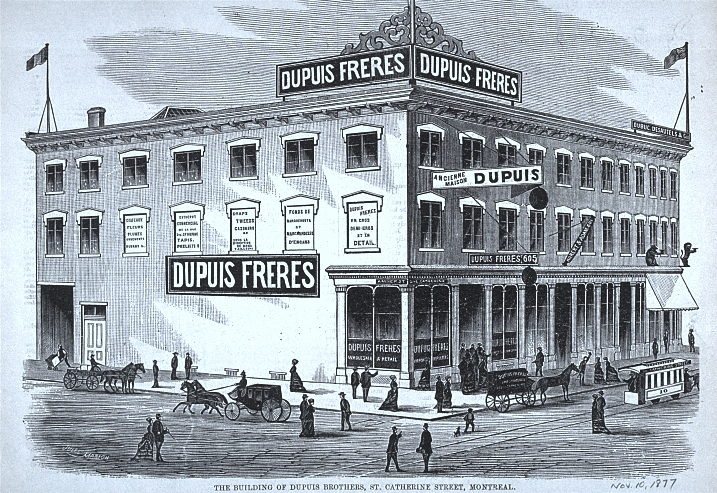
Dupuis Frères in 1877

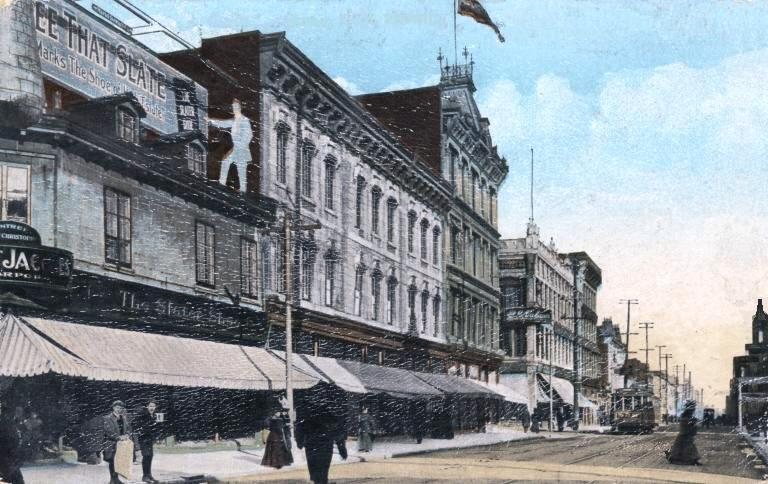
Dupuis Frères ca. 1910

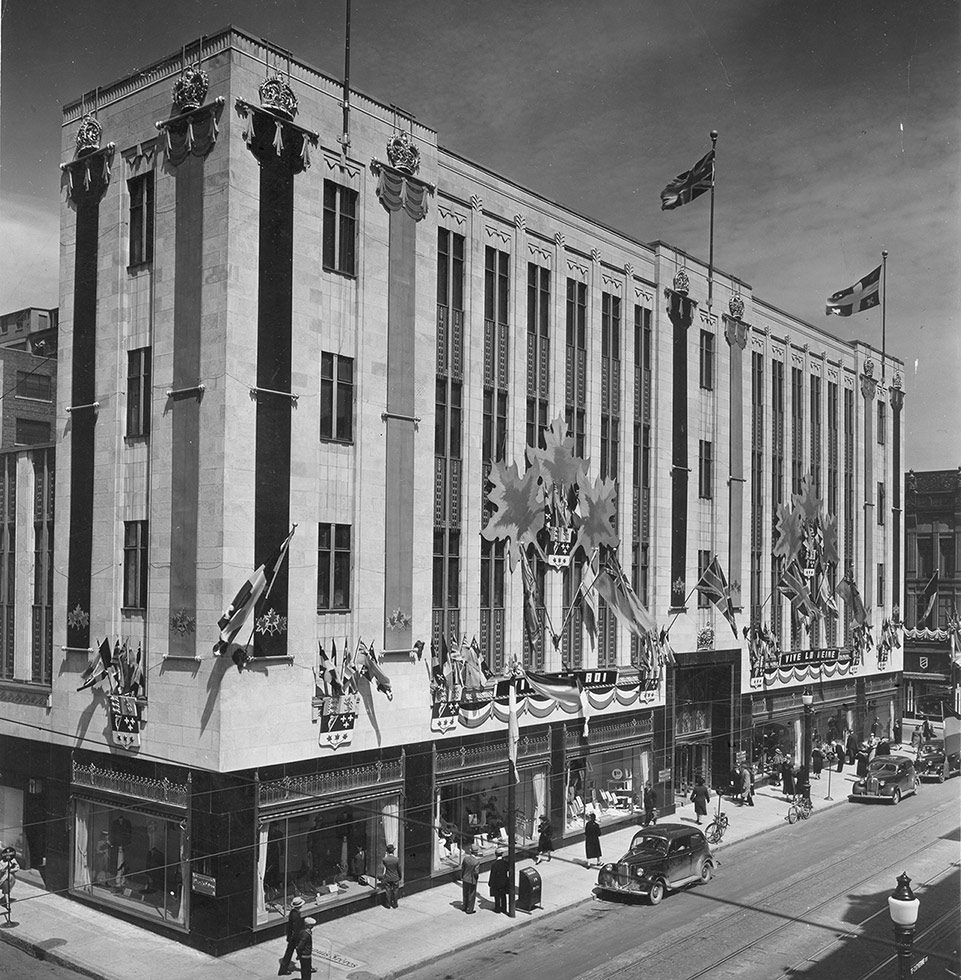
Dupuis Frères in 1939

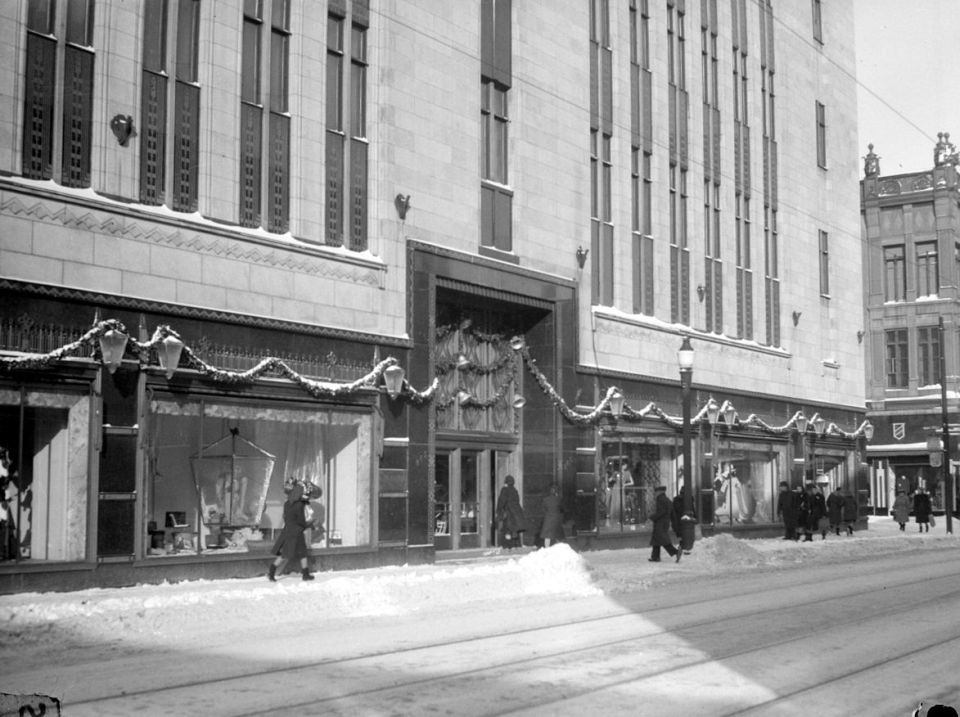
Dupuis Frères at Yuletide, 1946

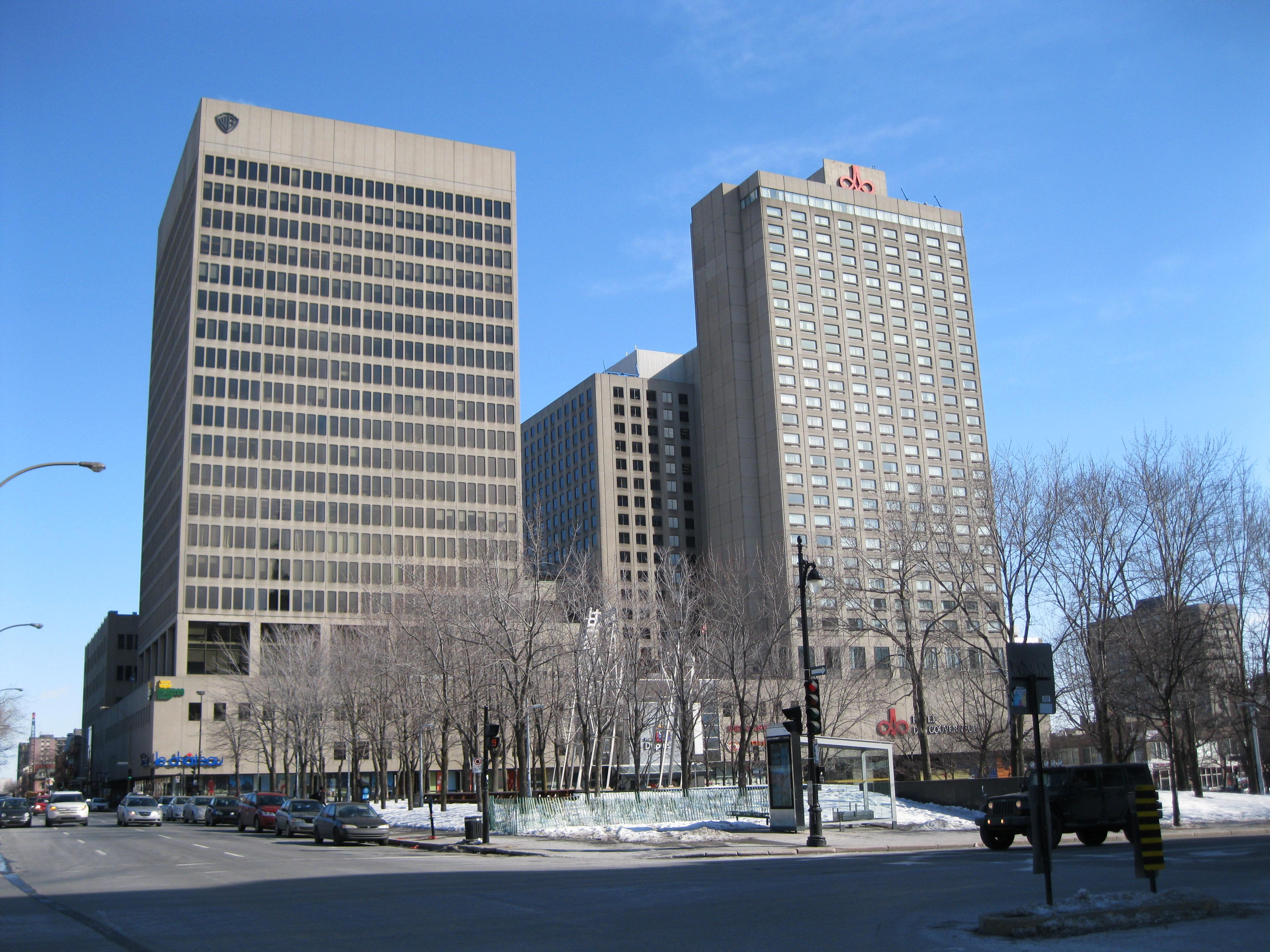
Place Dupuis, 2014

Dupuis Frères was a large department store on Sainte-Catherine Street East, in Montreal, Quebec, Canada. The store was founded in 1868 by Nazaire Dupuis, and closed permanently in 1978. Dupuis Frères was a symbol of French-Canadian economic success at a time when Montreal's economy was dominated by Anglophones (native English-speaking Quebeckers, mostly with British and Irish roots).

== History ==
On April 28, 1868, Nazaire Dupuis opened a small novelty store at 865 rue Sainte-Catherine est, in Montreal. He managed to interest several of his brothers in his business, which he called Dupuis Frères in 1870. Despite the economic crisis of 1872, the business continued to prosper.

In 1876, following the death of Nazaire Dupuis, the family participated directly in the management of the company.

The store moved a few times before settling permanently in 1882 at the corner of Saint-André and Sainte-Catherine streets, where it remained until its closing in 1978.

In 1924, Albert Dupuis became president of the company until his death in 1945. His son Raymond took over.

In the 1950s, around 1,500 people worked at the company.

The decline of the store began in 1952 with the strike of a significant majority of employees. The 1952 strike at Dupuis Frères^{[fr]} lasted 13 weeks and ended with the victory of the employees (mostly women) and the Confederation of Catholic Workers of Canada. A lockout in 1976, as well as financial problems, led to the bankruptcy of this famous Montreal institution and its closure in January 1978.

For 110 years, Dupuis Frères was one of the most important department stores in Montreal. It had a great influence on the development of commerce in the eastern part of the city.

== Place Dupuis ==
Place Dupuis (Dupuis Square) today anchors the southwest end of The Village a.k.a. The Gay Village, and is a 1,100,000-square-foot (100,000 m^{2}) mixed-use development with retail and office space as well as direct access to the Montreal Metro's Berri–UQAM station, where the Green and Orange lines intersect. In 1972, the Place Dupuis neighborhood shopping center was opened to complete the development of the block surrounding the store. Two office towers as well as the Gouverneur Hotel (now a Hyatt) Place Dupuis were added in 1973 and 1974. Finally, following the closure of the Dupuis store in 1978, the building housing it was redeveloped to create the Les Atriums office building, opened in 1981. Currently the shopping center has a Bureaux En Gros (Staples) office supply superstore, IGA supermarket, Jean Coutu pharmacy, SAQ liquor store, and an 11-outlet food court.

On October 2, 2023, a gigantic mural paying tribute to the artist Françoise Sullivan was inaugurated next to the Hyatt hotel, part of the complex. Titled Damiers 2023, the work is 108 meters high and includes 33 colored squares. The mural is part of a collection created by MU^{[fr]} muralists which pays tribute to Montreal's cultural builders

== In popular culture ==
Dupuis Frères is mentioned in the song "23 décembre"^{[fr]} ("December 23") by the group Beau Dommage. Robert Charlebois also talks about the famous store in his song "Québec Love"^{[fr]}. In a Sonnet Insurance advertisement, with hockey stars Jonathan Drouin, Doug Gilmour and the former coach of the Montreal Canadiens, Mario Tremblay, mention Dupuis Frères.
