= Berri Street =

Thoroughfare in Montreal, Canada

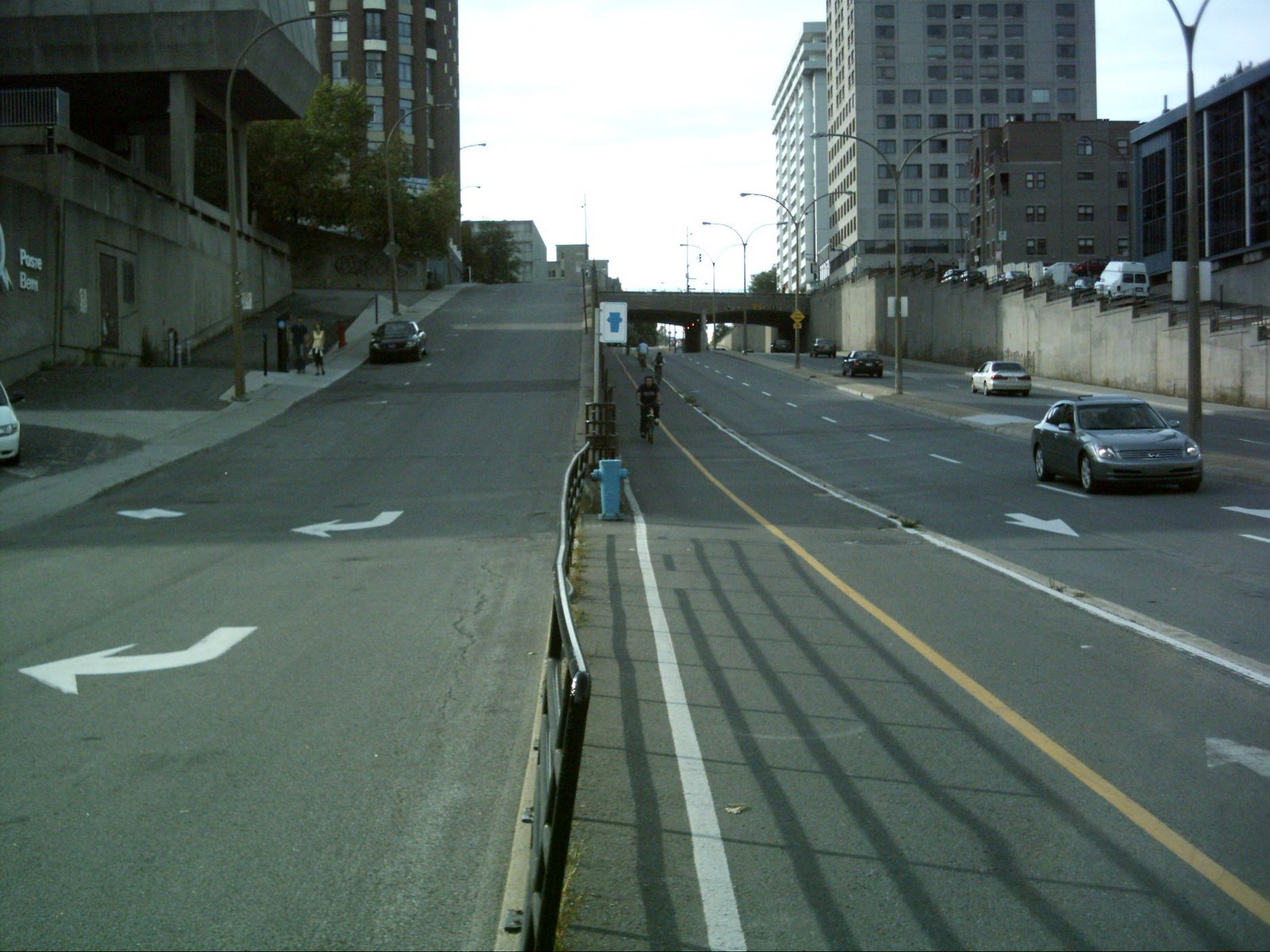
- Berri Street looking north toward Sherbrooke Street
- Interactive map of Berri Street
- Native name: rue Berri (French)
- Former name(s): Rue Saint-Gilles, ruelle Guy
- Part of: R-335
- Length: 11 km (6.8 mi)
- Location: Between Somerville Street and De la Commune Street
- Coordinates: 45.514952°N 73.560333°W
- Major junctions: A-40 (TCH); R-138

Construction
- Construction start: 1895

Berri Street (officially in French: rue Berri) is a major north–south street located in Montreal, Quebec, Canada. Berri Street links De la Commune Street in the south and Somerville Street in the north. The street is interrupted between Rosemont Boulevard and Jean Talon Street.

Berri Street has two lanes in either direction from De la Commune Street to Roy Street. It changes to one lane in either direction north of Roy Street. The street runs through two small tunnels, one under Notre-Dame Street and another under Sherbrooke Street. Berri Street has a bicycle lane from De la Commune Street to Sherbrooke Street.

All Montreal Metro stations on the Orange Line between Berri–UQAM and Henri-Bourassa are located under Berri Street. The Grande Bibliothèque is also located on Berri Street, near De Maisonneuve Boulevard.

Notable points of interest are located on Berri Street. The Sir George-Étienne Cartier National Historic Site is located on the corner of Berri and Notre-Dame Street.

== History ==
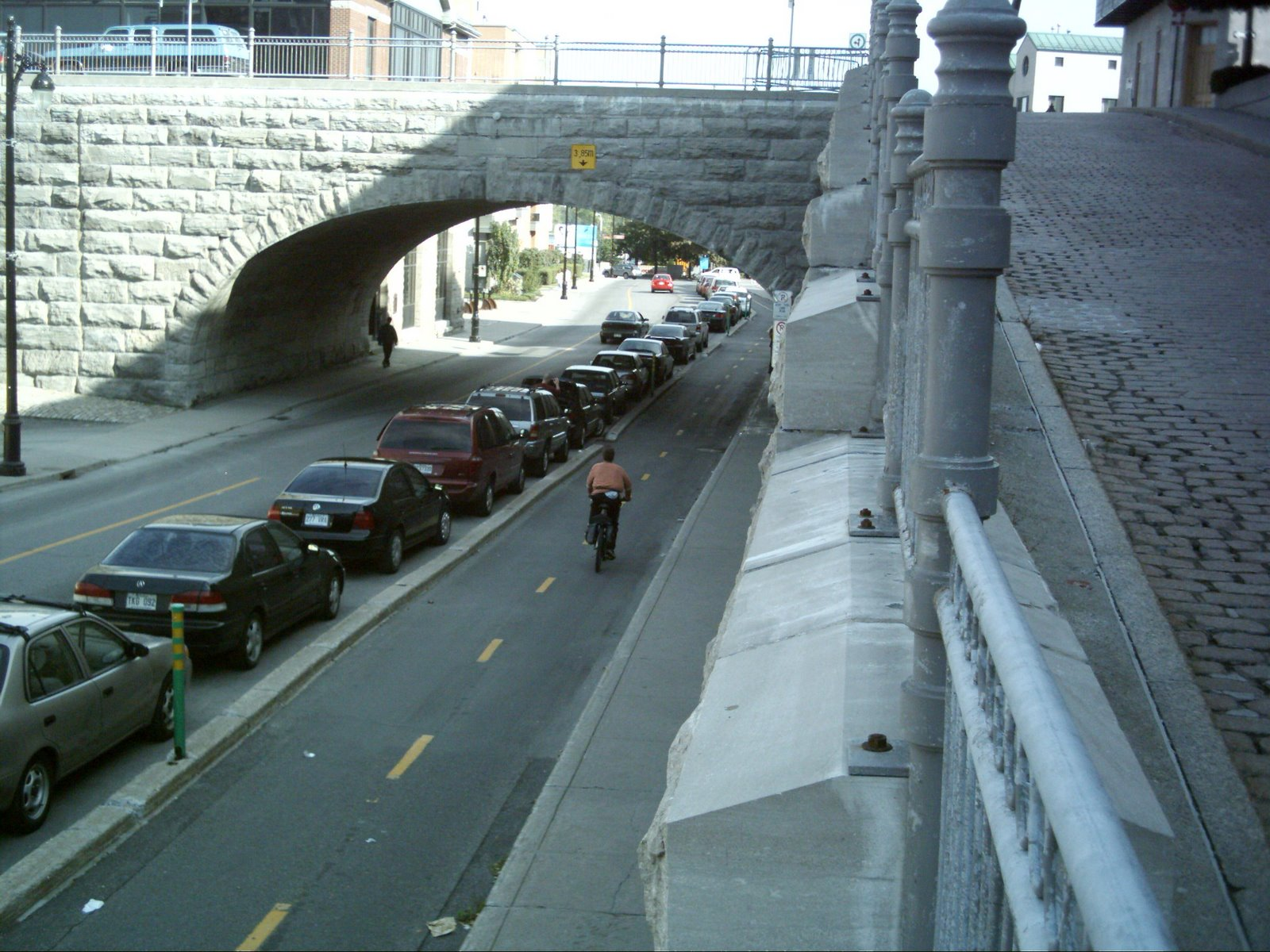
Looking southward at the intersection of Berri Street and Notre-Dame Street in Old Montreal.

The oldest segment of Berri Street opened in the 1690s when the Séminaire de Saint-Sulpice established a route towards the river, and became later known as rue Saint-Gilles.

At the turn of the 19th century, a small lane way was created by the name of ruelle Guy, near rue Saint-Gilles, between Saint Louis Street, and Saint Antoine Street. Starting on August 13, 1818, this lane way became known as Berry Street, and was named after Simon Després dit Le Berry. Involved in a conflict at La Flèche in 1653, he was killed by the Iroquois in 1663. He owned a piece of land west of the street. At the beginning of the Nineteenth century, this piece of land was always known as la Berry.

Berri Street took its modern form beginning in 1895, when land was expropriated for the construction of Viger Station. This allowed for Berri Street to be prolonged to De la Commune Street, fully integrating Rue Saint-Gilles.

It traverses the boroughs of Ville-Marie, Montreal, Le Plateau-Mont-Royal, Rosemont–La Petite-Patrie, Villeray–Saint-Michel–Parc-Extension and Ahuntsic-Cartierville.

There is also a Rue Berri in Laval's Pont-Viau district, running several blocks north from the Rivière des Prairies not far from the alignment of the Montreal street, although they are not connected.
