= Raoul Hunter =

Canadian artist

- Born: June 18, 1926; Saint-Cyrille-de-Lessard, l'Islet, Quebec, Canada
- Died: December 10, 2018 (aged 92); Quebec City
- Education: School of fine arts, Quebec and at the École nationale supérieure des beaux-arts of Paris
- Known for: sculptor and caricaturist

Raoul Hunter (June 18, 1926 – December 10, 2018) was a Canadian sculptor and caricaturist.

== Biography ==
Born in Saint-Cyrille-de-Lessard, l'Islet, Quebec, Canada, Hunter studied at l’École des Beaux-Arts de Québec and at the École nationale supérieure des Beaux-Arts of Paris.

He was a caricaturist for Quebec City's Le Soleil from 1956 to 1989.

From 1989 he worked primarily as a sculptor.

== Works ==
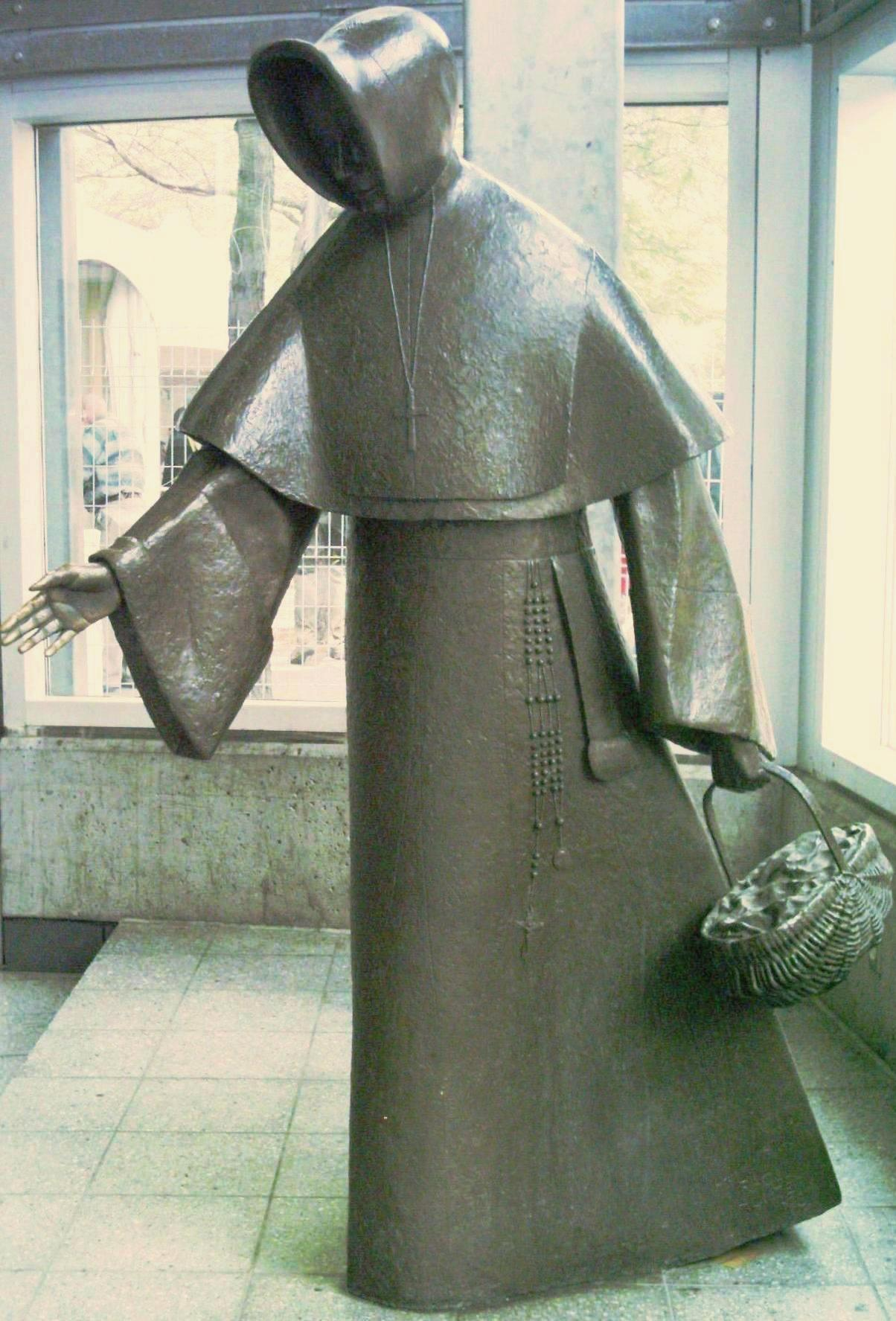
Raoul Hunter's Émilie Gamelin (1999) at Berri–UQAM station of the Montreal Metro

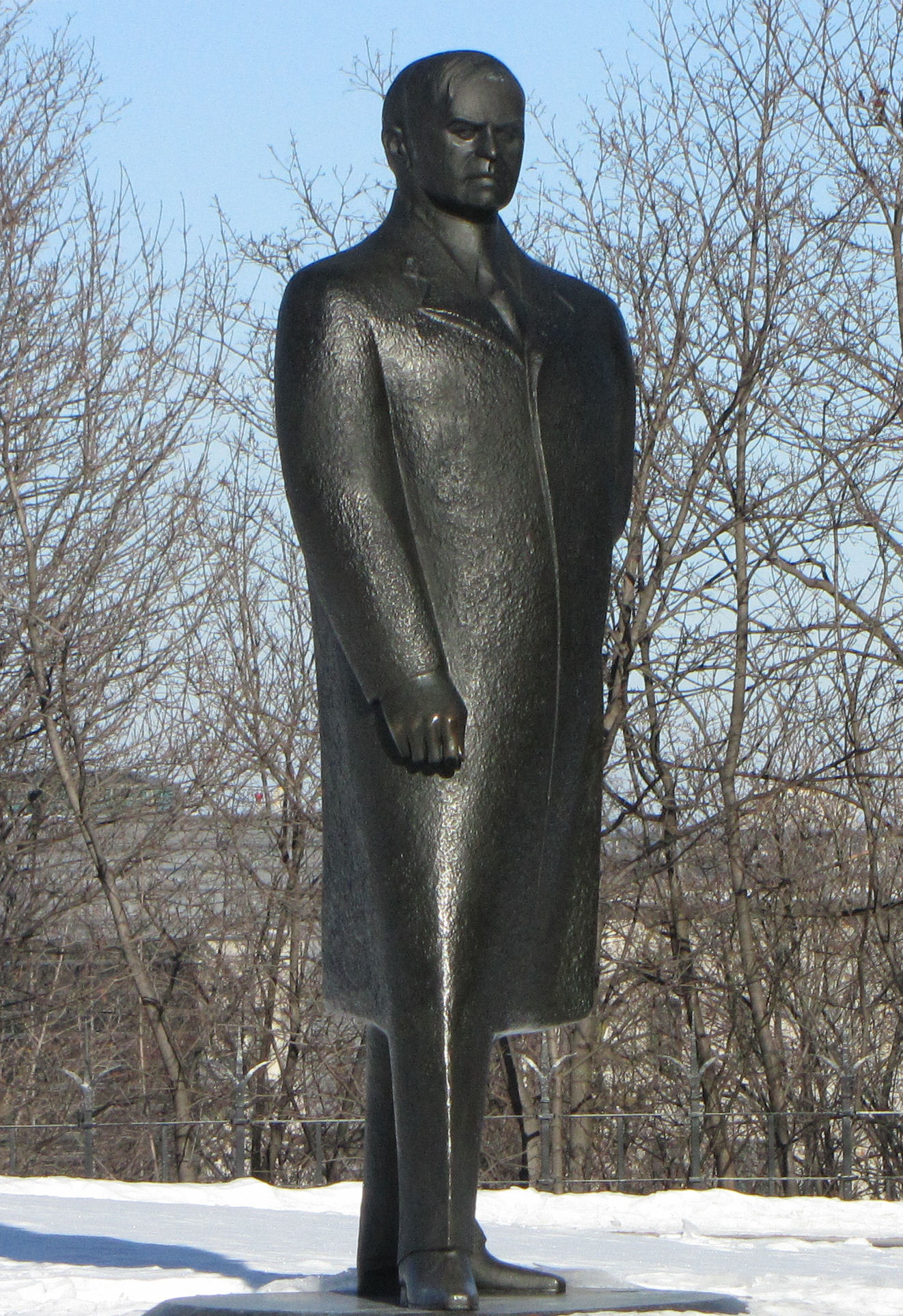
Raoul Hunter's William Lyon Mackenzie King (1967) on Parliament Hill, Ottawa, Ontario Canada

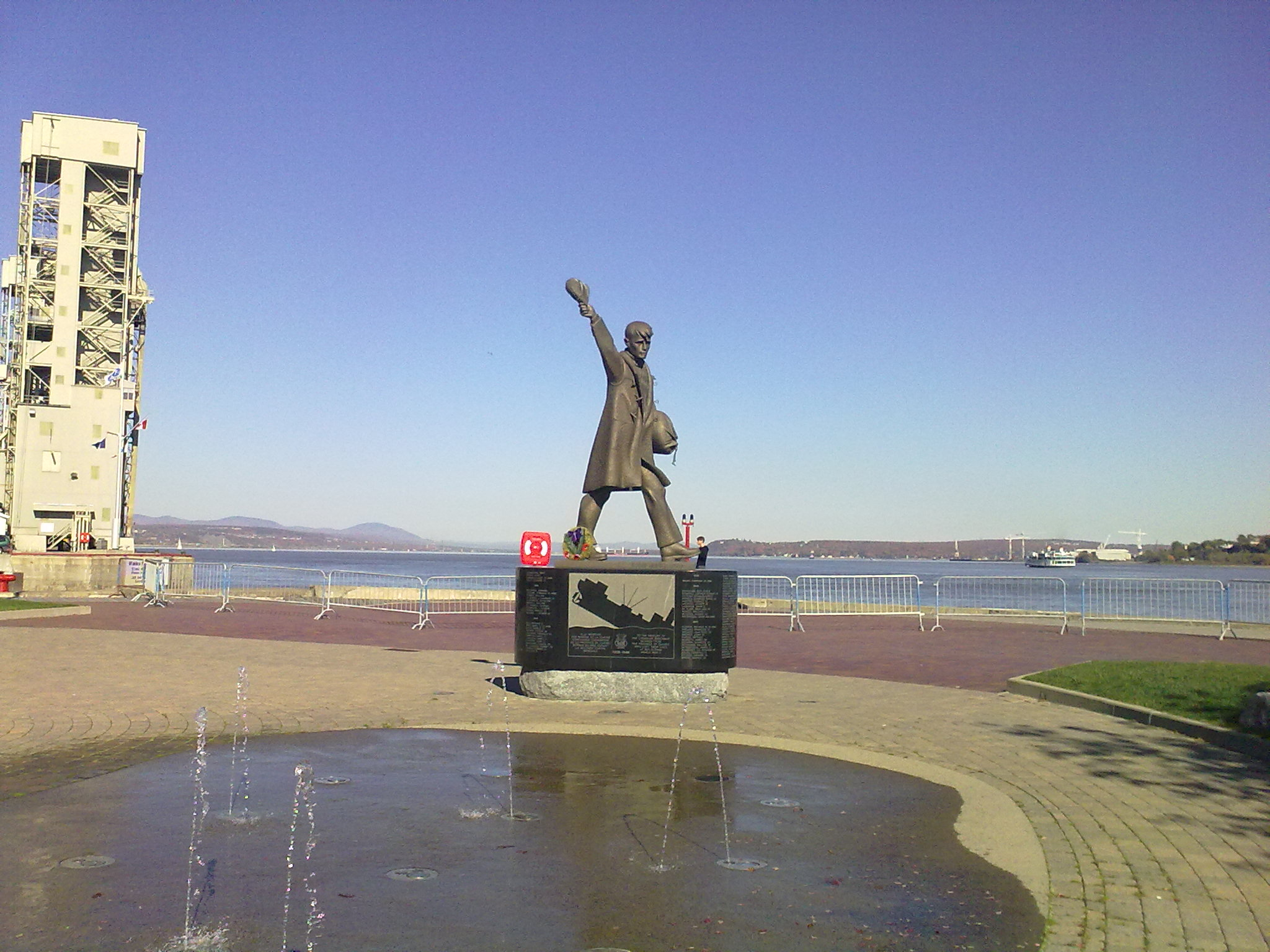
Raoul Hunter's Canadian Merchant Navy (2002) of World War II, Pointe-à-Carcy, Quebec
- Mother Émilie Gamelin, 1999, at Berri–UQAM station of the Montreal Metro.
- Statue of William Lyon Mackenzie King (1967), on Parliament Hill, Ottawa
- Monument to the memory of the Canadian merchant seamen from the province of Quebec who lost their lives at sea during World War II, Pointe-à-Carcy, Quebec, 2002.

== Honours ==
- Member since 1989 of the Order of Canada.
