= Quartier Latin, Montreal =

Quartier Latin
- Neighbourhood
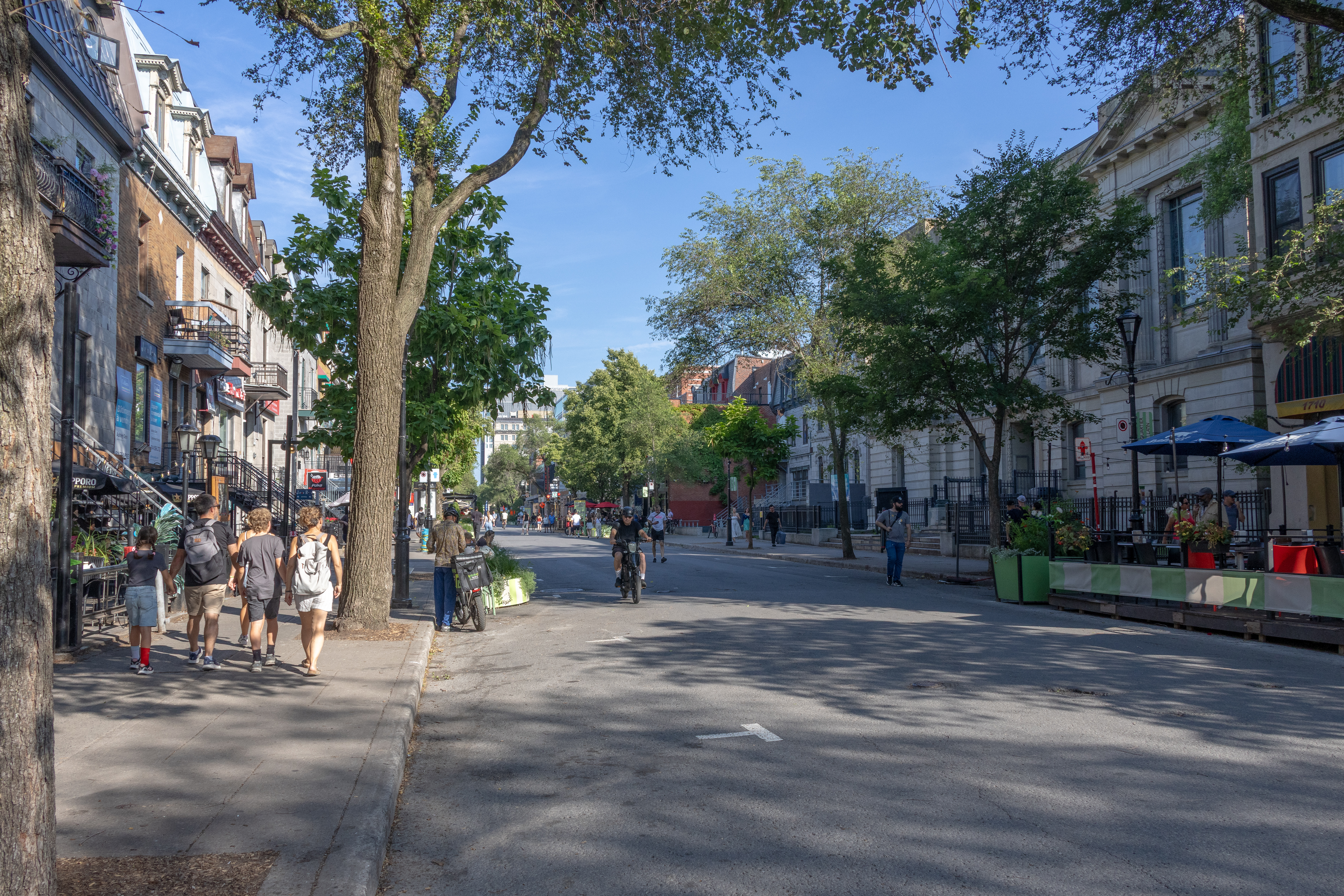
- Saint Denis Street in Quartier Latin

- Location of Quartier Latin in Montreal
- Coordinates: 45.512773°N 73.558359°W
- Country: Canada
- Province: Quebec
- City: Montreal
- Borough: Ville-Marie
- Postal Code: H2L, H2X
- Area codes: 514, 438

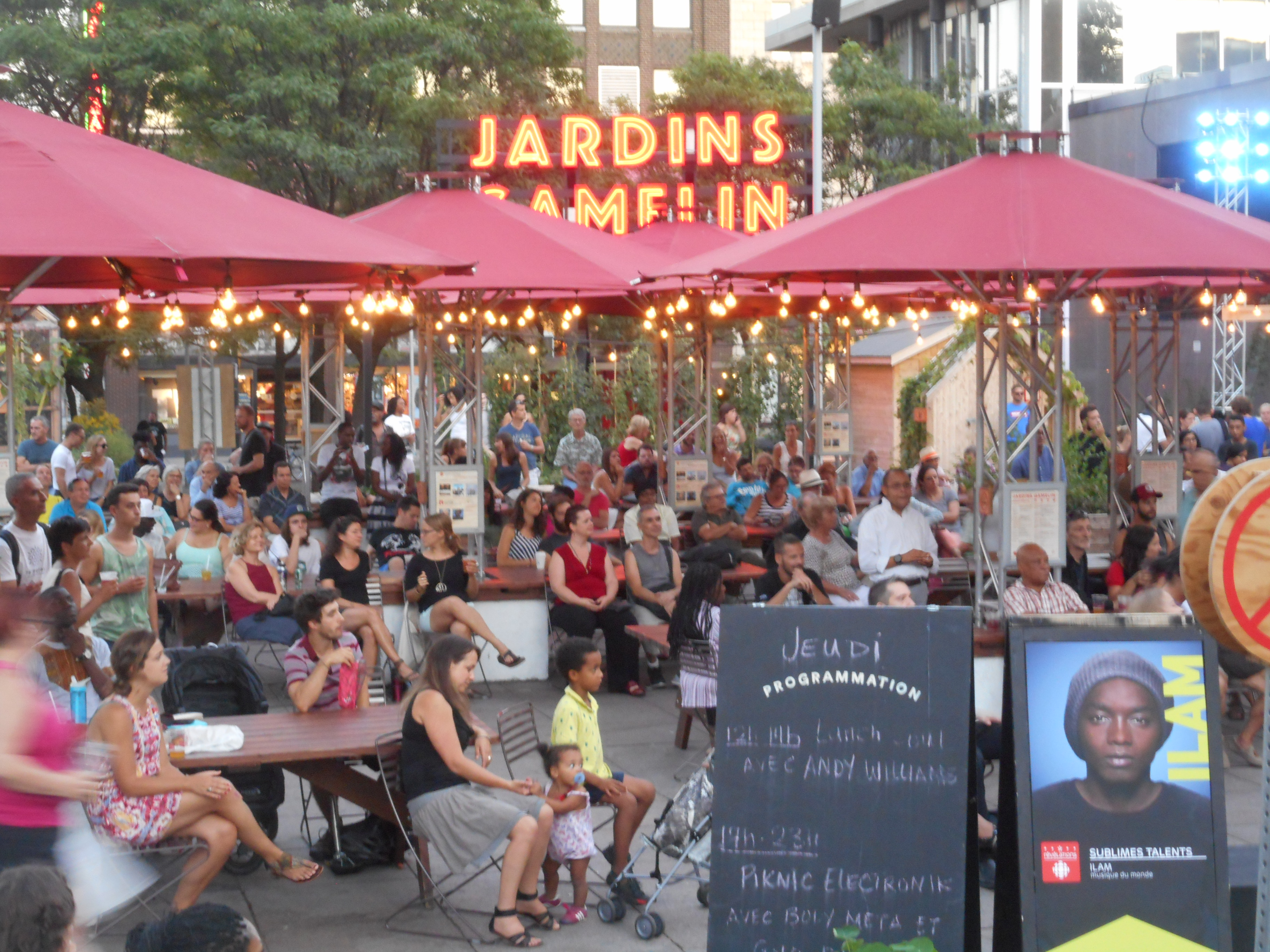
Place Émilie Gamelin in the summer

The Quartier Latin (French pronunciation: [kaʁtje latɛ̃]) is an area in the Ville-Marie borough of Montreal, located east of the Quartier des Spectacles and west of the Centre-Sud and Village, centred around UQAM and lower Saint-Denis Street. It is known for its theatres, artistic atmosphere, cafés, and boutiques. It owes its name, a reference to the Quartier Latin in Paris, to the presence of the École Polytechnique de Montréal and the nascent Université de Montréal in the 1920s. In the 1940s the university moved out and headed for a new campus on the north slopes of Mount Royal, far from the downtown borough. In the late 1960s UQAM was born and established itself in the Ville-Marie borough, giving a modern underpinning to the name. A large junior college, the CEGEP du Vieux-Montreal also moved in at about the same period.

The Grande Bibliothèque du Québec was opened in the area in 2005, joining the Cinémathèque québécoise as a key cultural attraction. The National Film Board of Canada's CinéRobotheque facility was based here until April 2012, when it was closed as part of cuts imposed by the 2012 Canadian federal budget.

Other notable attractions include the Metropolis and Les Foufounes Électriques concert halls, Place Émilie-Gamelin and the Archambault music retailer.
