= Ville-Marie, Montreal =

Coordinates: 45°30′31″N 73°33′46″W

Ville-Marie
- Borough
- A view of McGill College Avenue in December, looking north. The Mount Royal Cross is visible in the background.

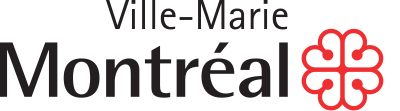

- Location of Ville-Marie on the Island of Montreal. (Grey areas indicate demerged municipalities).
- Country: Canada
- Province: Quebec
- Region: Montreal
- Established: January 1, 2002
- Electoral Districts Federal: Ville-Marie—Le Sud-Ouest—Île-des-Sœurs; Laurier—Sainte-Marie; Outremont
- Provincial: Westmount–Saint-Louis; Sainte-Marie–Saint-Jacques; Hochelaga-Maisonneuve; Saint-Henri–Sainte-Anne

Government
  - Type: Borough
  - Mayor: Soraya Martinez Ferrada
  - Federal MP(s): Marc Miller (LIB); Steven Guilbeault (LIB); Rachel Bendayan (LIB)
  - Quebec MNA(s): Jennifer Maccarone (PLQ); Manon Massé (QS); Alexandre Leduc (QS); Guillaume Cliche-Rivard (QS)

Area
  - Total: 16.5 km^{2} (6.4 sq mi)

Population (2021)
  - Total: 104,944
  - Density: 6,360.2/km^{2} (16,473/sq mi)
  - Change (2016–2021): ▲+17.7%
  - Dwellings: 51,430
- Time zone: UTC-5 (EST)
  - Summer (DST): UTC-4 (EDT)
- Postal code(s): H3A, H5A, H3B, H5B, H3C, H3G, H3H, H2L, H2K, H2Y, H2Z, H4Z
- Area codes: (514) and (438)
- Access Routes A-10: R-134; R-136; R-138; R-335
- Website: www.ville.montreal.qc.ca/villemarie

Ville-Marie (French pronunciation: [vil maʁi]) is the name of a borough (arrondissement) in the centre of Montreal, Quebec. The borough is named after Fort Ville-Marie, the French settlement that would later become Montreal (now Old Montreal), which was located within the present-day borough. Old Montreal is a National Historic Site of Canada.

The borough comprises all of downtown Montreal, including the Quartier des spectacles; Old Montreal and the Old Port; the Centre-Sud area; most of Mount Royal Park as well as Saint Helen's Island and Île Notre-Dame.

In 2016, it had a population of 104,944 and an area of 16.5 square kilometres (6.4 mi^{2}).

== Geography ==
It is bordered by the city of Westmount (along Atwater Avenue) to the west and the boroughs of Le Sud-Ouest (along the Autoroute Ville-Marie, Guy and Notre-Dame streets, and the Bonaventure Autoroute) to the southwest, Mercier–Hochelaga-Maisonneuve (along the CP rail lines) to the east, Le Plateau-Mont-Royal (along Sherbrooke, University streets, and Pine and Park avenues) to the northeast, and Outremont and Côte-des-Neiges—Notre-Dame-de-Grâce (along the border of Mount Royal Park) to the north. It is bounded on the south by the Saint Lawrence River.

== Government ==
=== Municipal ===
District	Position	Name	Party
—	Borough mayor (as mayor of Montreal)	Soraya Martinez Ferrada	Ensemble Montréal
Peter-McGill	City councillor	Leslie Roberts	Ensemble Montréal
Saint-Jacques	City councillor	Claude Pinard	Ensemble Montréal
Sainte-Marie	City councillor	Christopher McCray	Projet Montréal
—	Borough councillors (appointed by the mayor from Montreal City Council)	Effie Giannou (City councillor for Bordeaux-Cartierville, Ahuntsic-Cartierville)	Ensemble Montréal
—	Borough councillors (appointed by the mayor from Montreal City Council)	Julien Hénault-Ratelle (City councillor for Tétreaultville, Mercier–Hochelaga-Maisonneuve)	Ensemble Montréal

As of 2009, the office of borough mayor, rather than being elected by the borough's citizens, is held ex officio by the mayor of Montreal. Also, two of the members of the borough council are city councillors from other boroughs, chosen by the mayor.

Rather than a dedicated borough hall, the borough's offices and council chambers are located in the Place Dupuis office tower at 800 De Maisonneuve Boulevard East.

This governing structure is due to the unique status of Ville-Marie as the centre of Montreal.

=== Federal and Provincial ===
The borough is divided among the following federal ridings:

- Ville-Marie—Le Sud-Ouest—Île-des-Sœurs
- Laurier—Sainte-Marie
- Outremont

It is divided among the following provincial electoral districts:

- Westmount–Saint-Louis
- Sainte-Marie–Saint-Jacques
- Hochelaga-Maisonneuve (small corner in east)
- Saint-Henri–Sainte-Anne (small corner in south-west)
- Outremont (three small corners of Mount Royal Park to the borough's north-west)

== Demographics ==
Historical populations
Year	Pop.	±%
1966	110,988	—
1971	93,735	−15.5%
1976	77,409	−17.4%
1981	70,669	−8.7%
1986	69,159	−2.1%
1991	68,894	−0.4%
1996	71,788	+4.2%
2001	74,832	+4.2%
2006	78,876	+5.4%
2011	84,013	+6.5%
2016	89,170	+6.1%
2021	104,944	+17.7%

Home language (2016)
Language	Population	Percentage (%)
French	43,645	54%
English	21,680	27%
Other languages	16,045	20%

Mother tongue (2016)
Language	Population	Percentage (%)
French	41,815	50%
English	13,205	16%
Other languages	29,030	34%

Visible Minorities (2016)
Ethnicity	Population	Percentage (%)
Not a visible minority	55,175	63.7%
Visible minorities	31,380	36.3%

== Neighbourhoods ==
Ville-Marie includes the city's downtown, the historical district of Old Montreal, Le Quartier Chinois, the Gay Village, the Latin Quarter, the recently gentrified Quartier international and Cité Multimédia as well as the Quartier des Spectacles which is newly developed. Other neighbourhoods of interest in the borough include the affluent Golden Square Mile and Îlot-Trafalgar-Gleneagles at the foot of Mount Royal and the Shaughnessy Village/Quartier Concordia area home to thousands of students at Concordia University. The borough also comprises most of Mount Royal Park, Cité du Havre, Saint Helen's Island, and Île Notre-Dame.

== Transportation ==
Montreal's interurban rail and bus terminals, and its two commuter rail terminals (Central Station, Lucien-L'Allier and the Downtown Terminus) are in the borough. It is served by the Orange, Green, and Yellow Lines of the Montreal Metro. The Metro's central station, Berri–UQAM (which is a terminus of the Yellow Line), and the Central Bus Station, are also located in Ville-Marie.

Two autoroutes serve the area: Autoroute Bonaventure and the partly underground Autoroute Ville-Marie. Two bridges — the Victoria Bridge and Jacques-Cartier Bridge — provide access to the South Shore, while the Pont de la Concorde provides access to Saint Helen's Island and Notre Dame Island (Parc Jean-Drapeau). The Jacques-Cartier Bridge also provides access to Saint Helen's Island and Notre Dame Island.

== Attractions ==
Many of Montreal's most famous attractions are situated in Ville-Marie. Most of its office towers, including 1000 de La Gauchetière, 1250 René-Lévesque, the Tour de la Bourse, Place Ville-Marie, the Sun Life Building, the Maison Radio-Canada, and many others are located here.

Three of Montreal's four universities — McGill, Concordia, and UQAM — are located in Ville-Marie, as are three of its four basilicas — Mary, Queen of the World Cathedral, Notre-Dame Basilica, and St. Patrick's Basilica. Cultural infrastructure includes Grande Bibliothèque du Québec, Place des Arts, the Montreal Museum of Fine Arts, the Quartier des spectacles, the Montreal Science Centre, Pointe-à-Callière Museum, Musée Grévin Montreal, and numerous other important venues.

Sports complexes include the Bell Centre, home of the Montreal Canadiens; the Percival Molson Stadium, home of the Montreal Alouettes; and the Circuit Gilles Villeneuve on Île Notre-Dame, site of the Canadian Grand Prix.

Hospitals include the Centre hospitalier de l'Université de Montréal (CHUM) megahospital, opened in 2017, as well as the Montreal General Hospital and Hôpital Notre-Dame.

Major parks and recreation areas include Mount Royal and its park, Parc Jean-Drapeau (the site of Expo 67), Dorchester Square and Place du Canada, and the Old Port.

The Montreal Public Libraries Network operates the Frontenac and Père-Ambroise libraries in the eastern part of the borough.

== Economy ==
As Ville-Marie contains Montreal's central business district, numerous companies are headquartered or have major regional offices in the borough, including Bombardier Aerospace. The International Civil Aviation Organization and the International Air Transport Association are also located in this borough.

== Education ==
The Commission scolaire de Montréal (CSDM) operates French-language public schools.

=== Elementary ===
- École Marguerite-Bourgeoys
- École Garneau
- École Champlain
- École Jean-Baptiste-Meilleur
- École Saint-Anselme

=== Specialized ===
- École des métiers de la restauration et du tourisme de Montréal
- École des métiers des Faubourgs-de-Montréal
- École Éducation pour Adultes Centre Lartigue
- École Éducation pour Adultes Centre Gédéon-Ouimet

The English Montreal School Board (EMSB) operates English-language schools.

==== Elementary ====
- F.A.C.E. Elementary School (jointly run with the CSSDM)

==== High school ====
- F.A.C.E. High School (jointly run with the CSSDM)
- École Pierre-Dupuy

== See also ==
- Boroughs of Montreal
- Districts of Montreal
- Municipal reorganization in Quebec
