= Grande Bibliothèque du Québec =

- Type: Public corporation of the province of Quebec, Canada.
- Established: 1998

Collection
- Items collected: books, e-books, music, cds, periodicals, maps, genealogical archives, business directories, local history,

Other information
- Website: BAnQ's Official Website (in French, with English summary)]

The Grande Bibliothèque du Québec (French pronunciation: [ɡʁɑ̃d biblijɔtɛk dy kebɛk], GBQ) was a public corporation of the province of Quebec, Canada. It came into existence in 1998 and merged with Bibliothèque nationale du Québec in 2002. Its purpose was to plan the creation of the Grande Bibliothèque.

== See also ==
- Bibliothèque et Archives nationales du Québec
- Literature of Quebec
