= Centre-Sud =

- Neighbourhood
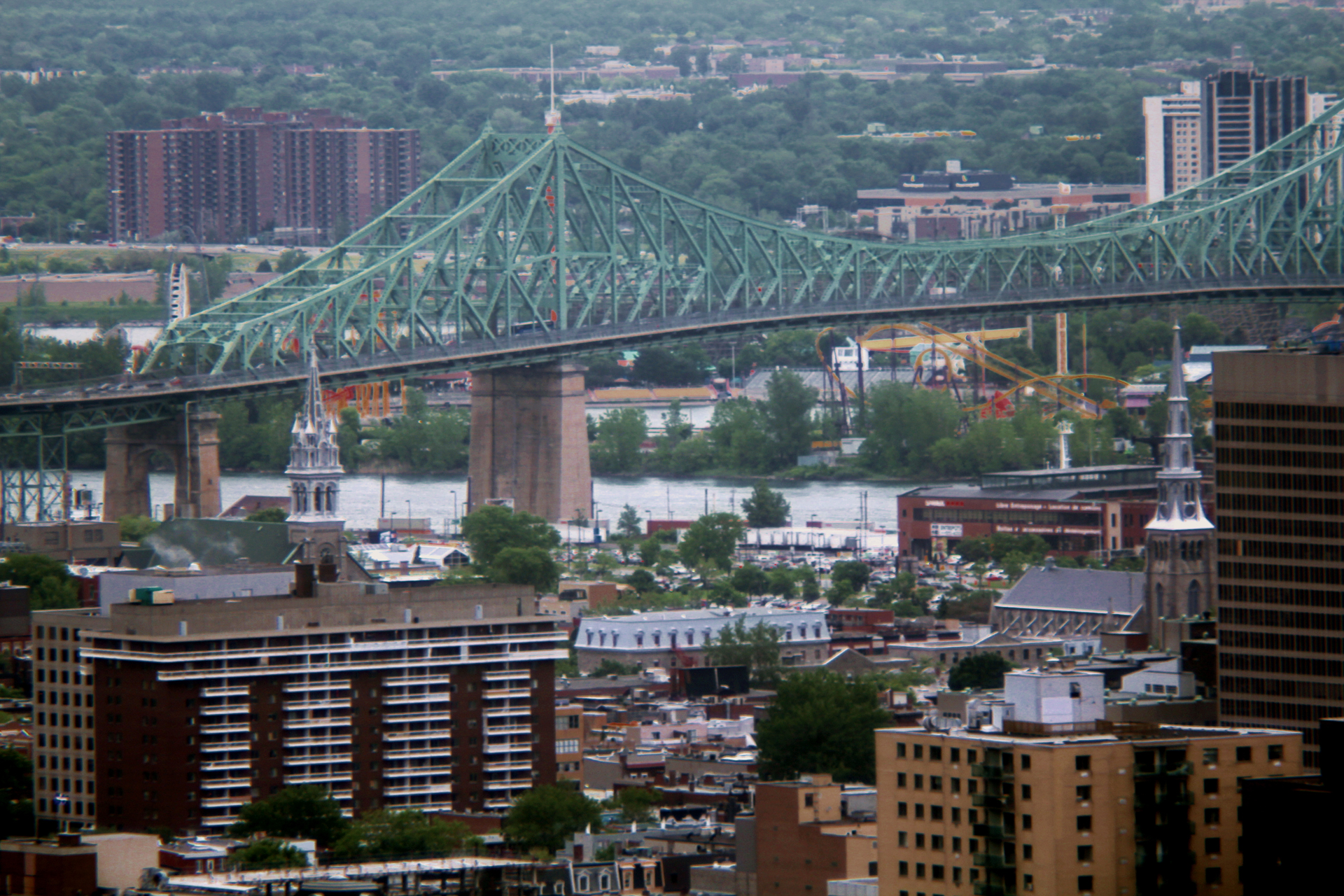
- The Centre-Sud neighbourhood around the Jacques Cartier Bridge
- Nicknames: Bas de la Ville; Bas de la Côte
- Location of Centre-Sud in Montreal
- Coordinates: 45.523565°N 73.55187°W
- Country: Canada
- Province: Quebec
- City: Montreal
- Borough: Ville-Marie
- Postal code(s): H2K, H2L
- Area codes: 514 and 438

The Centre-Sud (French pronunciation: [sɑ̃tʁ syd]) is a neighbourhood located in the easternmost edge of the Ville-Marie borough of the city of Montreal.

Home to Montreal's Gay Village and to the Sainte-Marie area, the Centre-Sud has long been seen as one of the city's most complex neighbourhoods.

Having held a notorious reputation for poverty and prostitution for decades, particularly on Rue Ontario and Rue Dufresne, gentrification has changed the neighbourhood considerably in recent years.

== History ==
=== Early history ===
During the era of New France, when the city was fortified, the populated area east of the walls came to be known as Faubourg Québec, a name that would live on as Faubourg à m'lasse.

In 1782, the Molson family settled the area, purchasing a small brasserie from Irishman Thomas Loyd, which eventually developed into the brewery of the same name.

Following the Lower Canada Rebellion, several Patriotes were hanged at the Pied-du-Courant Prison, a prison by the water. It ceased to be a prison in 1912, and the historic building was acquired by the SAQ in 1921, serving as its head office for a time.

Construction of the Jacques Cartier Bridge began in 1925, and was opened to traffic on May 14, 1930, becoming a prominent landmark in the neighbourhood.

A large section of the neighbourhood known as Faubourg à m'lasse was torn down in 1963 to build the Maison Radio-Canada.

=== Contemporary ===
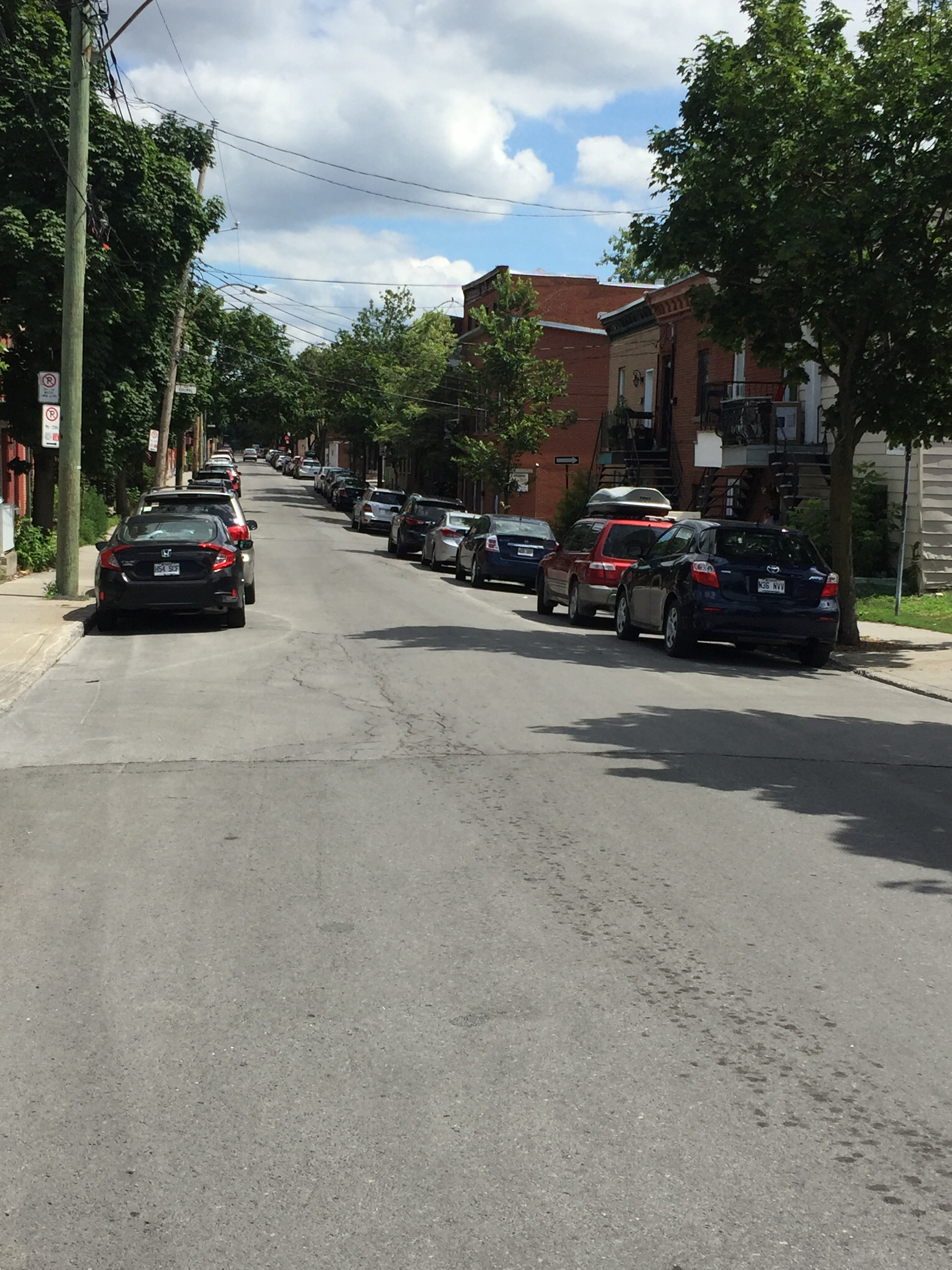
Rue Dufresne, was notorious for prostitution and drug houses from the 1990s to 2010s

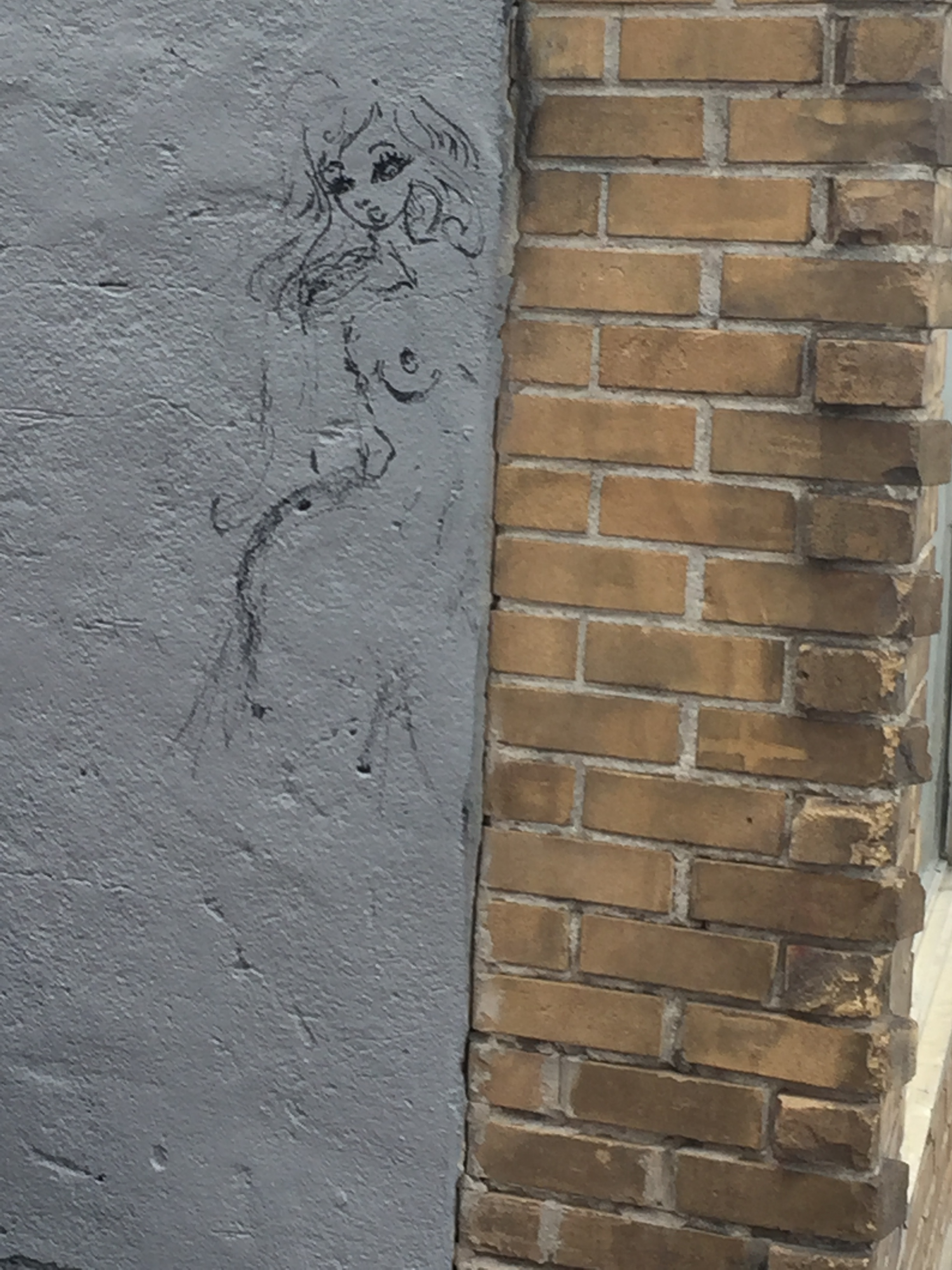
Mural on Rue Ontario, acknowledging the Centre-Sud's long held reputation for prostitution

An impoverished working class neighbourhood, the Centre-Sud began attracting members of the gay and lesbian community in the 1980s, due in part to affordability, after the migration of many gay businesses from other parts of the city. The area between St-Hubert and De Lorimier developed into the Gay Village by the 1990s as a result.

During the Quebec Biker War, the Rock Machine had their bunker in the Centre-Sud from 1992 to 1997, which contributed to a bad reputation for poverty, organized crime and prostitution.

In 2001, a section of the neighbourhood known as l'îlot Huron, where the bunker and other illicit businesses thrived, was demolished to build a ramp to the Jacques Cartier Bridge and a large park, Parc des Faubourgs.

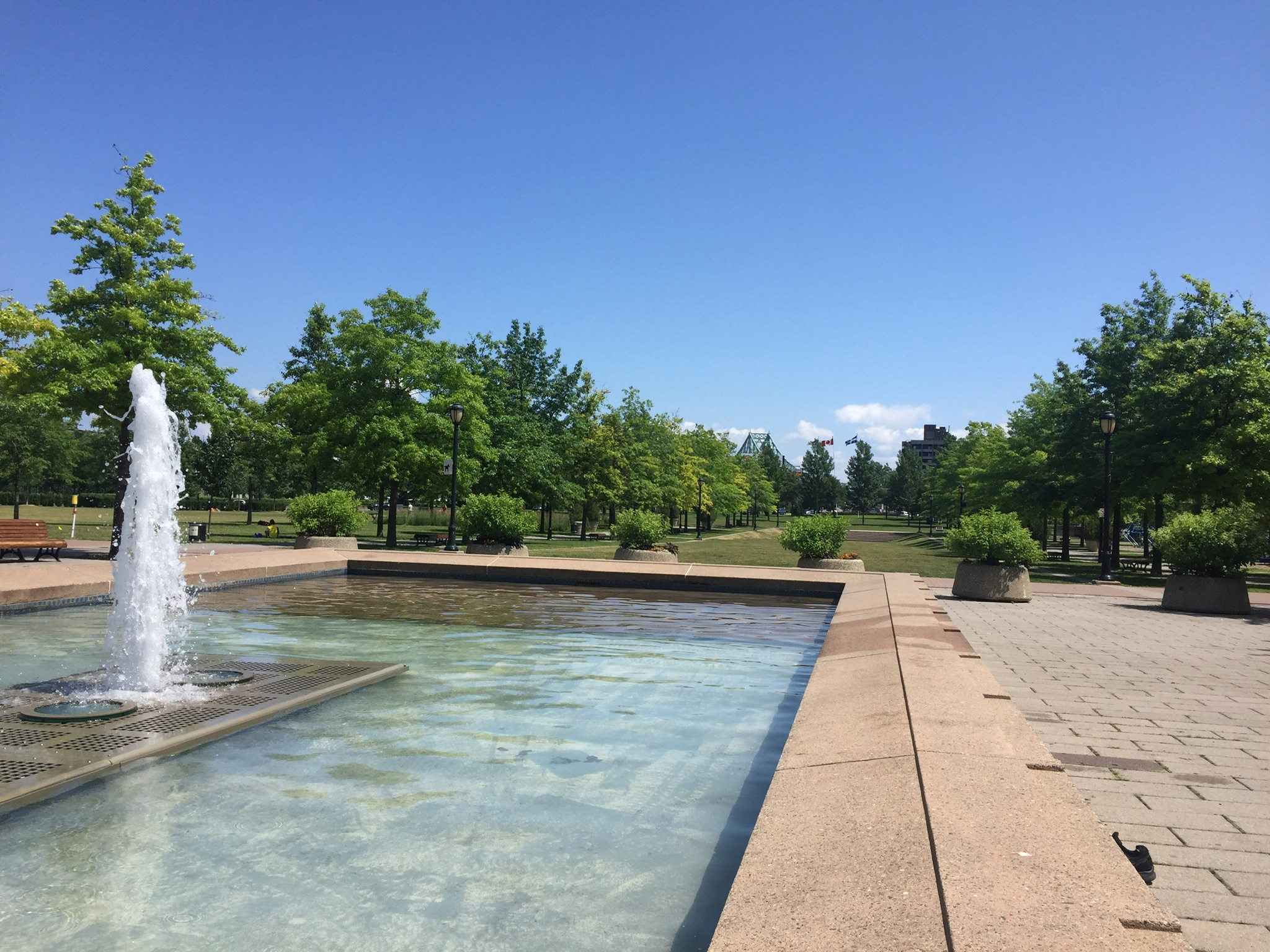
Parc des Faubourgs, former site of the Rock Machine bunker

In recent years the neighbourhood has experienced significant gentrification and social change.

== Features ==
The Jacques Cartier Bridge and the Maison Radio-Canada are prominent in the skyline, as well as the Sûreté du Québec's headquarters, known as the Prison Parthenais.

Notable features include the Molson Brewery, Gay Village, Hopital Notre-Dame, JTI MacDonald tobacco company and the historic Pied-du-Courant prison.

The Centre-Sud is well known for its street art and murals, notably of Québécois singers and actors, including Paul Buissonneau, Raymond Lévesque, Marjo, Robert Gravel, Pauline Julien, Plume Latraverse and Yvon Deschamps.

Due to its poverty and proximity to downtown, a significant number of shelters, supervised injection sites and resources for the homeless are located in the neighbourhood. This includes Dans la Rue for homeless youth, and the Old Brewery Mission's Patricia Mackenzie Pavilion for homeless women. Another shelter, Refuge des Jeunes, for young men 18-25, is also in the Centre-Sud.

== Public services ==
The city of Montreal operates the Bibliothèque Frontenac and Bibliothèque Père-Ambroise libraries respectively.

The city also operates several indoor pools and arenas including the Aréna Camillien-Houde, Centre Jean-Claude-Malépart and Piscine Quintal.

The borough hall of Ville-Marie, is also located in the Centre-Sud, in the Place Dupuis shopping mall.

== Geography ==
The neighbourhood is bordered by the Saint Lawrence River to the south, Saint Hubert Street to the west, the Canadian Pacific rail line to the east and Sherbrooke Street to the north.

The Plateau is located to the north, Mercier-Hochelaga-Maisonneuve to the east and the Quartier Latin to the west.

Its main arteries running east to west are Rue Ontario, Boulevard De Maisonneuve, Rue Saint Catherine Est and Boulevard René Lévesque.

Major streets and avenues running north to south include Saint-Hubert, Papineau, De Lorimier, D'Iberville and Frontenac.

== Transportation ==
The neighbourhood is accessible by the following Montreal Metro stations, Frontenac, Papineau, Beaudry and Berri–UQAM (partly).

The following STM bus routes pass through the Centre-Sud;

List of STM bus routes
No.	Route Name
10	De Lorimier
14	Atateken
15	Sainte-Catherine
30	Saint-Denis/Saint-Hubert
34	Sainte-Catherine
45	Papineau
85	Hochelaga
94	D'Iberville
125	Ontario
185	Sherbrooke
355 ☾	Papineau
358 ☾	Sainte-Catherine
445	Express Papineau

== Education ==
The Commission scolaire de Montréal (CSDM) operates French-language public schools.

=== Elementary ===
- École Marguerite-Bourgeoys
- École Garneau
- École Champlain
- École Jean-Baptiste-Meilleur
- École Saint-Anselme

=== Secondary ===
- École Pierre-Dupuy

=== Specialized ===
- École des métiers des Faubourgs-de-Montréal
- École Éducation pour Adultes Centre Lartigue
- École Éducation pour Adultes Centre Gédéon-Ouimet

== Politics ==
The neighbourhood is part of the Montreal City Council district of Sainte-Marie and the federal riding of Laurier—Sainte-Marie. Provincially it’s part of Sainte-Marie–Saint-Jacques, with a small eastern corner in the Hochelaga-Maisonneuve riding, despite not being part of that neighbourhood.

== Notable people ==
- Richard Beaulieu, comic book artist and writer
- Janette Bertrand, journalist and actress
- Dino Bravo (1948-1993), professional wrestler
- Daniel Breton, environment activist and former MNA for Sainte-Marie–Saint-Jacques
- André Desjardins (1930-2000), corrupt trade unionist and loanshark, notably involved with the mafia and later Mom Boucher
- Camillien Houde (1889-1958), former mayor of Montreal
- Gilles Latulippe (1937-2014), comedian and actor
- Léo Major (1921-2008), WW2 veteran and recipient of the Distinguished Conduct Medal (DCM)
- Manon Massé, social activist, former co-spokesperson of Québec Solidaire, MNA for Sainte-Marie–Saint-Jacques

== Popular culture ==
The neighbourhood is the subject of Richard Beaulieu’s Chroniques du Centre-Sud, a 2014 graphic novel portraying the neighbourhood in the 1990s.

The novel Ces Spectres Agités by Louis Hamelin is also set in the Centre-Sud.

In 2013, a group of collaborative authors and photographers, released Hôtel Jolicoeur. A novel, in a scrapbook format, about a former motel and brothel located in the heart of the Centre-Sud, on the corner of Ontario and Papineau.

Other novels set in the Centre-Sud include the autobiographies Pute de Rue (2003) by Roxanne Nadeau and L’Enfer d’une fille de rue (2020) by Isa-Belle St-Sauveur.

The 2003 documentary, Sexe de rue, focuses on prostitution in the neighbourhood.

Atach Tatuq released a song about the Centre-Sud in 2005 entitled Australie in their final album Deluxxx.

It's also featured in Rue Ontario, a 2010 single by Bernard Adamus.

== Gallery ==
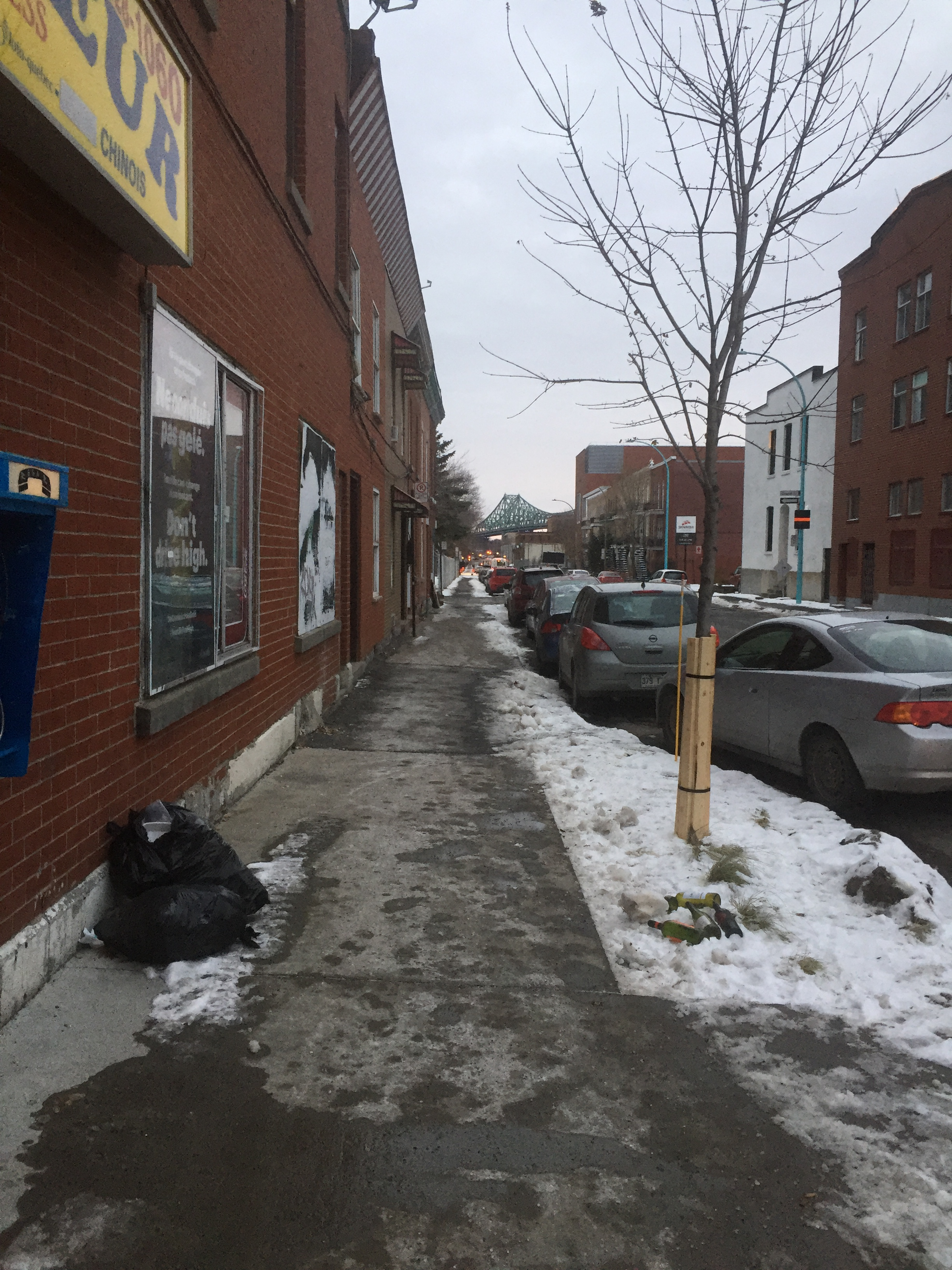
Sainte-Marie, looking south towards the Jacques Cartier bridge

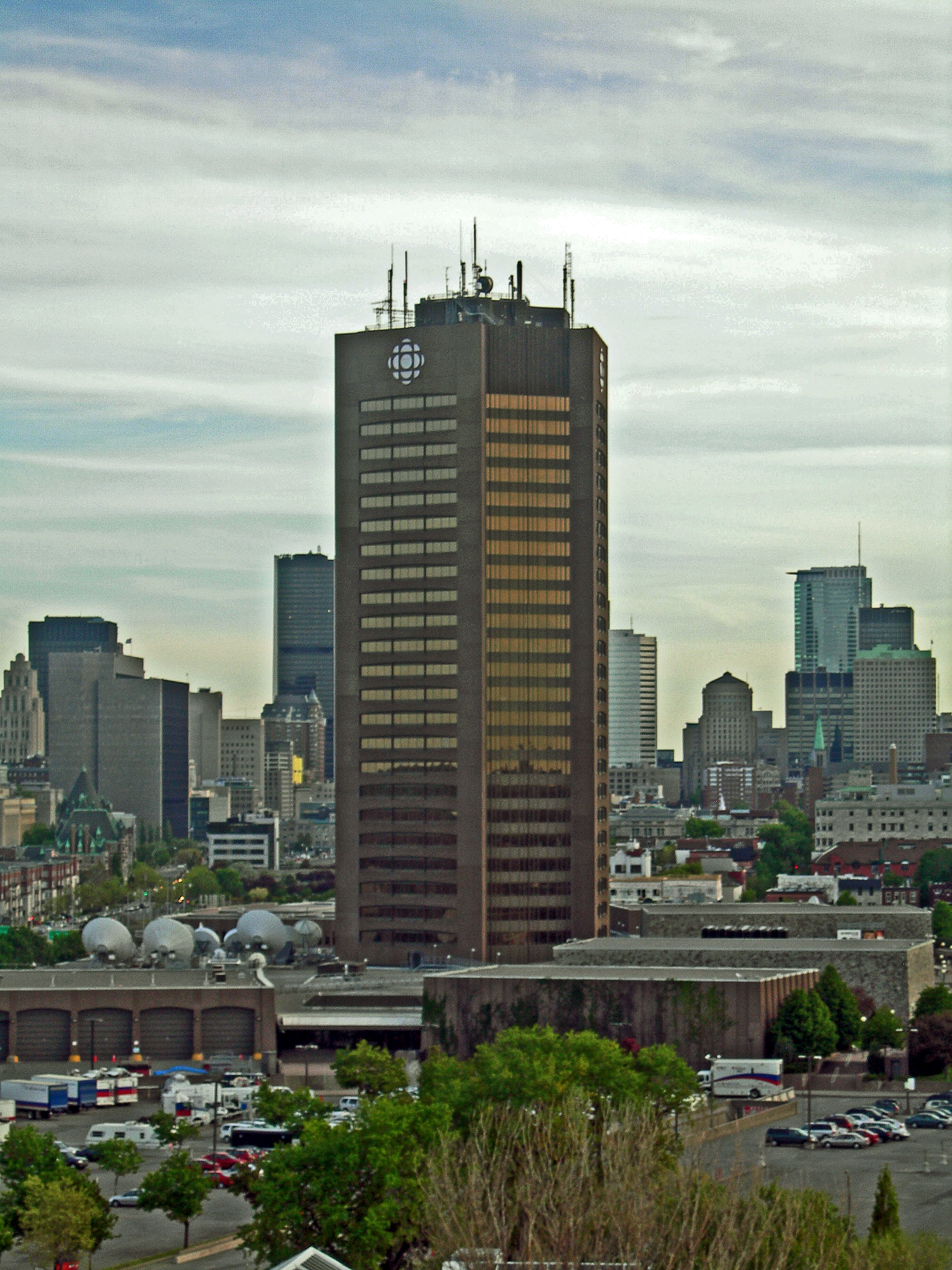
The Maison Radio-Canada

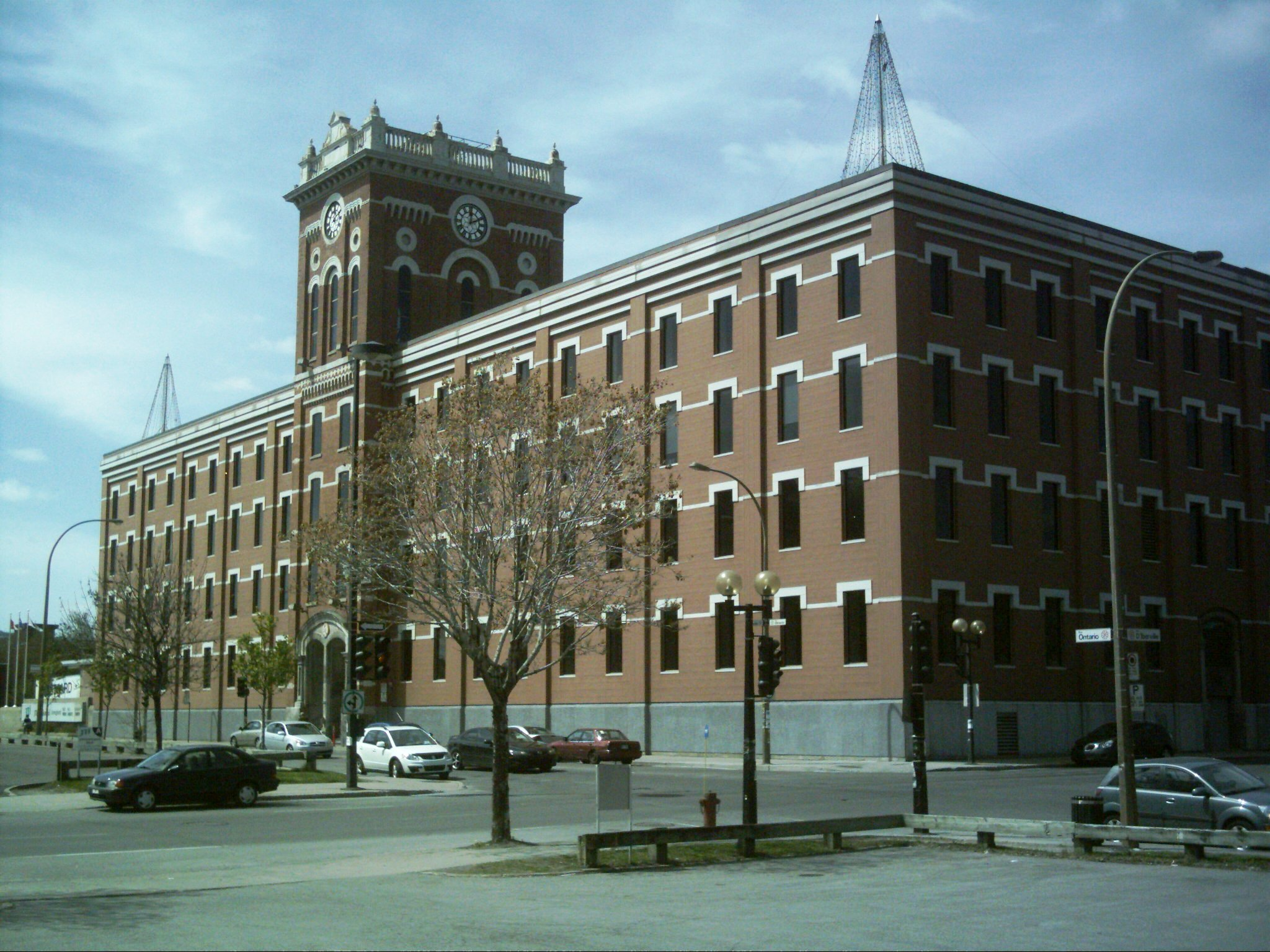
The historic JTI MacDonald factory on Ontario Street

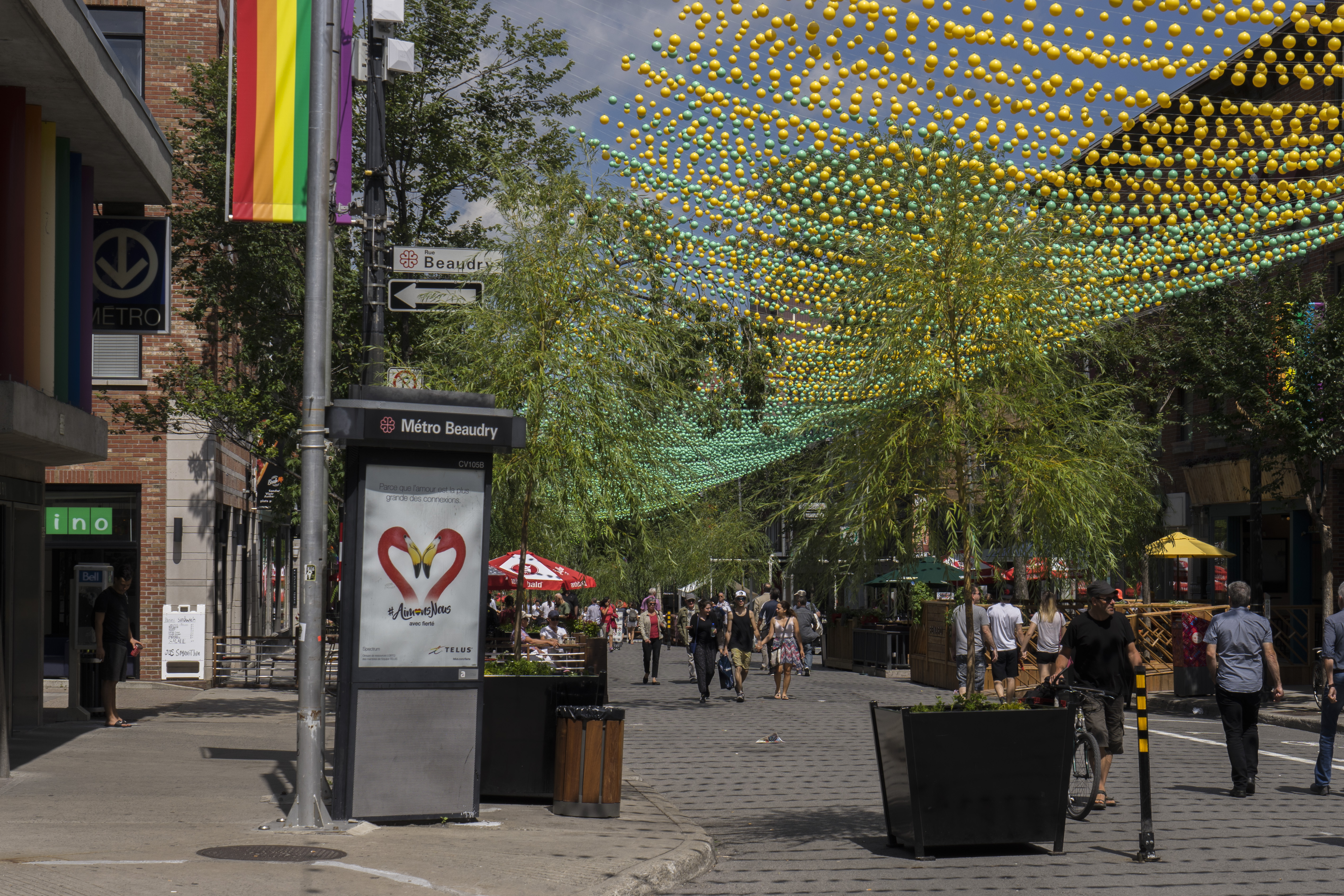
The Gay Village

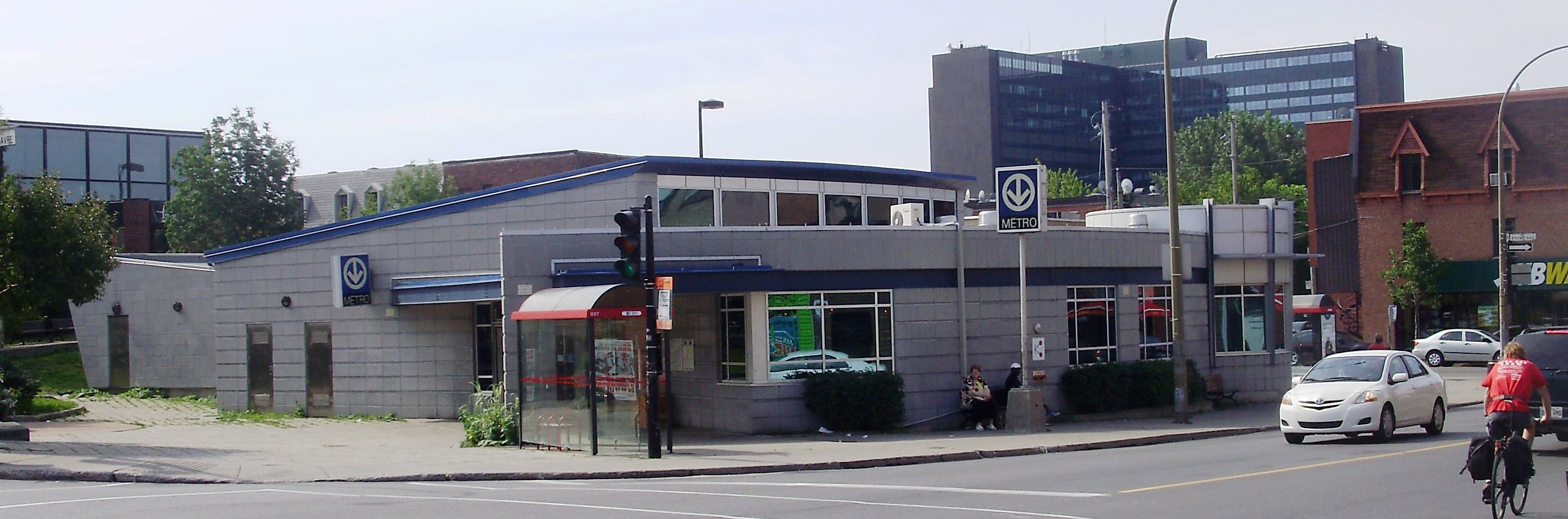
The area around the Frontenac station
