= Monastère du Bon-Pasteur =

Building in Quebec, Canada

Monastère du Bon-Pasteur Bon-Pasteur Monastery
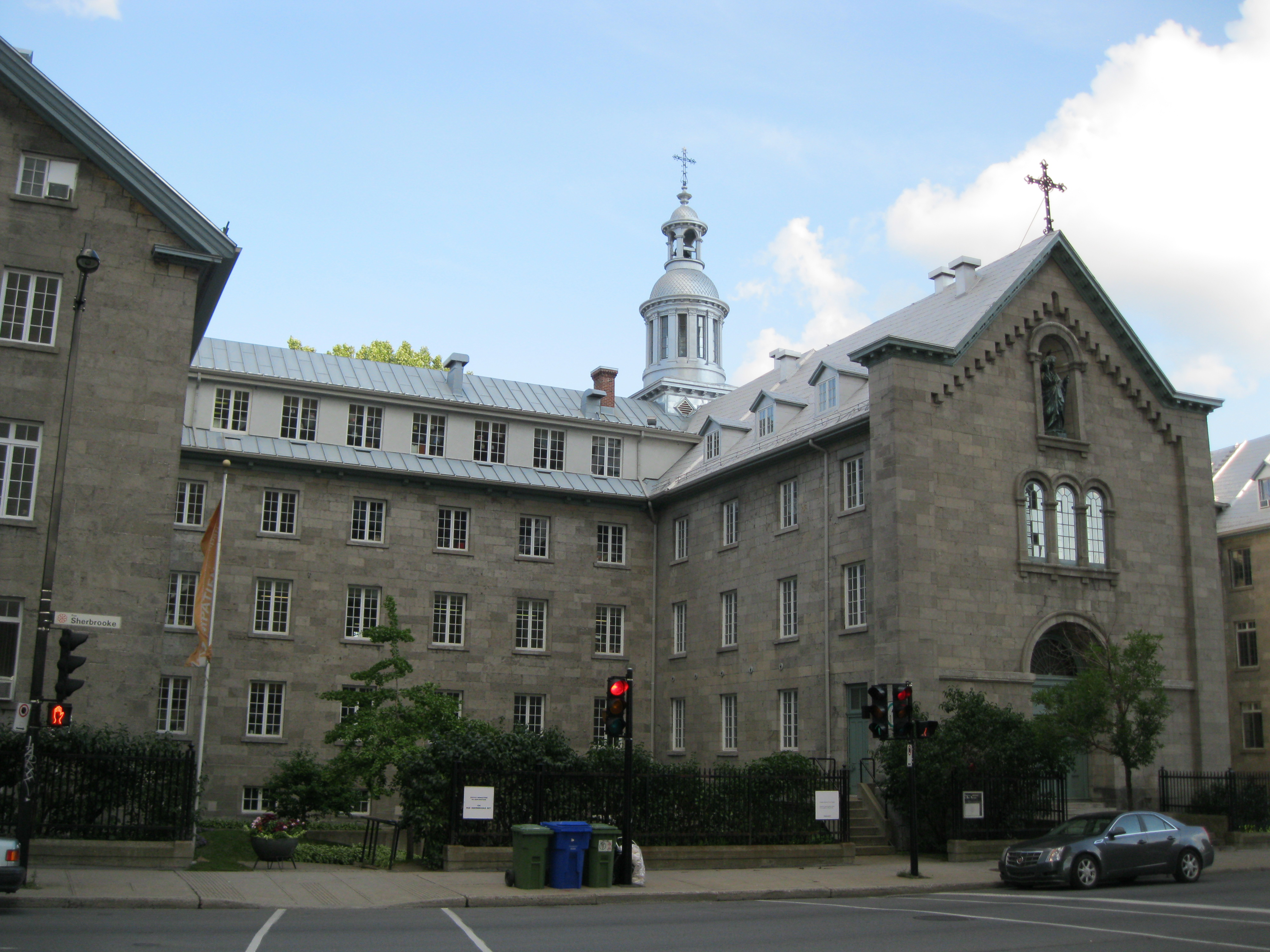
- The monastery's exterior, 2017

Religion
- Affiliation: Roman Catholicism
- Diocese: Sainte-Marie neighbourhood
- Leadership: Sœurs du Bon Pasteur

Location
- Location: 52–104 Sherbrooke Street (East); Montreal, Quebec, Canada; H2X 1C3
- Interactive map of Monastère du Bon-Pasteur; Bon-Pasteur Monastery
- Coordinates: 45°30′48″N 73°34′8″W

Architecture
- Architects: Victor Bourgeau; John Ostell; Félix Martin
- Style: Neoclassical architecture
- Completed: 1893
- Materials: Limestone ashlar, stone, brick (Note: In the presbytery only)

Patrimoine culturel du Québec
- Designated: 11 July 1979

The Monastère du Bon-Pasteur is a multifunctional site in Montreal, Québec. It houses offices, a long-term care home, private apartments, and a historic chapel: the Chapelle historique du Bon-Pasteur. Located at 100 Sherbrooke Street East, the former monastery forms part of the Sainte-Marie neighbourhood.

The Monastère du Bon-Pasteur was classified as a heritage building by the Québec Minister of Culture and Communications on 11 July 1979.

== History ==
The Sisters of the Bon Pasteur (Sœurs du Bon Pasteur) came to Montreal from France in 1844. They sought to provide care for delinquent young girls, orphans, and otherwise disadvantaged youth. In 1846, they were granted a parcel of land outside the then-limits of the City of Montreal, in a hamlet established in the 18th century called Côte-à-Baron. Construction of the monastery began that same year, making it one of the first public buildings to be raised on Sherbrooke Street, along with McGill University.

During the typhus epidemic of 1847, the cholera pandemic of 1849, and the Great Fire of 1852, the new monastery served as a place of refuge for the local population.

In 1861, the north-east wing of the main building was erected to house a Young Ladies' Academy. The public chapel, designed by the architect Victor Bourgeau, was built in 1878; it stands out by its position at the centre of the building. Neoclassical architectural elements were added by the architect John Ostell and the Jesuit Félix Martin. A new wing was annexed in 1884 to include a trade school. This wing was extended again towards Sherbrooke Street in 1893. A presbytery was constructed in 1896 at the intersection between Sherbrooke Street and Cadieux Street (modern-day De Bullion).

Between 1888 and 1903, a laundromat, studios, and outbuildings were erected behind the monastery. These buildings allowed for the interior courtyard to be closed off.

After years of neglect, the monastery was sold to the Société d'habitation du Québec in 1979. The same year, it was classified as a heritage building by the Quebec government, and further classified as a protected area in 1981. Nonetheless, it was not until 1987 that a restoration took place, following the acquisition of the building by the Société immobilière du patrimoine architectural de Montréal, who transformed it into the multifunctional building it is today.

== Historic Chapel of the Bon-Pasteur ==
The Chapelle historique du Bon-Pasteur, which can accommodate 160 people, is managed by the Cultural Service of the City of Montreal and is part of the network of 'arts centres' in Montreal.

Restored in 1987, the chapel was converted into a concert hall. Today, it is considered to be one of the best concert halls for chamber music in Montreal due to its acoustics. The chapel has a Fazioli piano, known for its clarity and richness of sound, and a Kirckman harpsichord from 1772.

Every season, the chapel hosts classical music, contemporary, and jazz concerts, as well as public hearings and conferences. In addition, it has a space dedicated to visual arts expositions.

The 2023–2024 slate of concerts, along with the historic instruments, had to be moved to the Canadian Centre for Architecture due to damage sustained to the chapel in the May 2023 fire.

== May 25, 2023 fire ==
At 4:30 p.m. on 25 May 2023, the monastery underwent a major fire that took more than 24 hours to extinguish. Two days later, about 15 firefighters were still on site to ensure that the fire did not restart. The inspection of the structural damage, including to the chapel, started the same day, and evacuees were able to return and collect their personal belongings. The damaged historic instruments, namely the 250-year-old harpsichord and the Fazioli piano, were also retrieved. There were no fatalities, no people reported missing, and only two reports of minor injuries, including a man in his 80s and a firefighter.

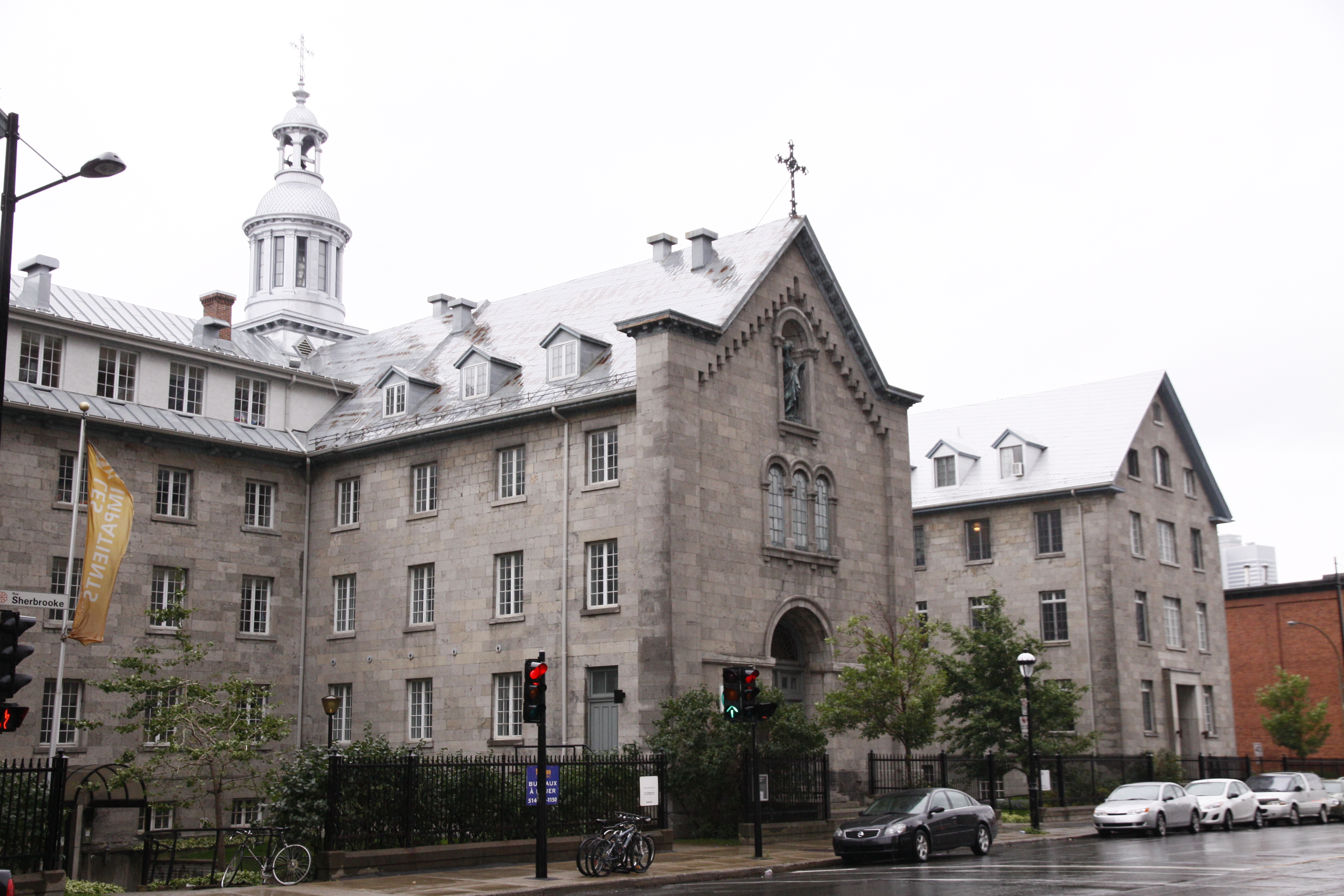
The Monastère du Bon-Pasteur in 2011

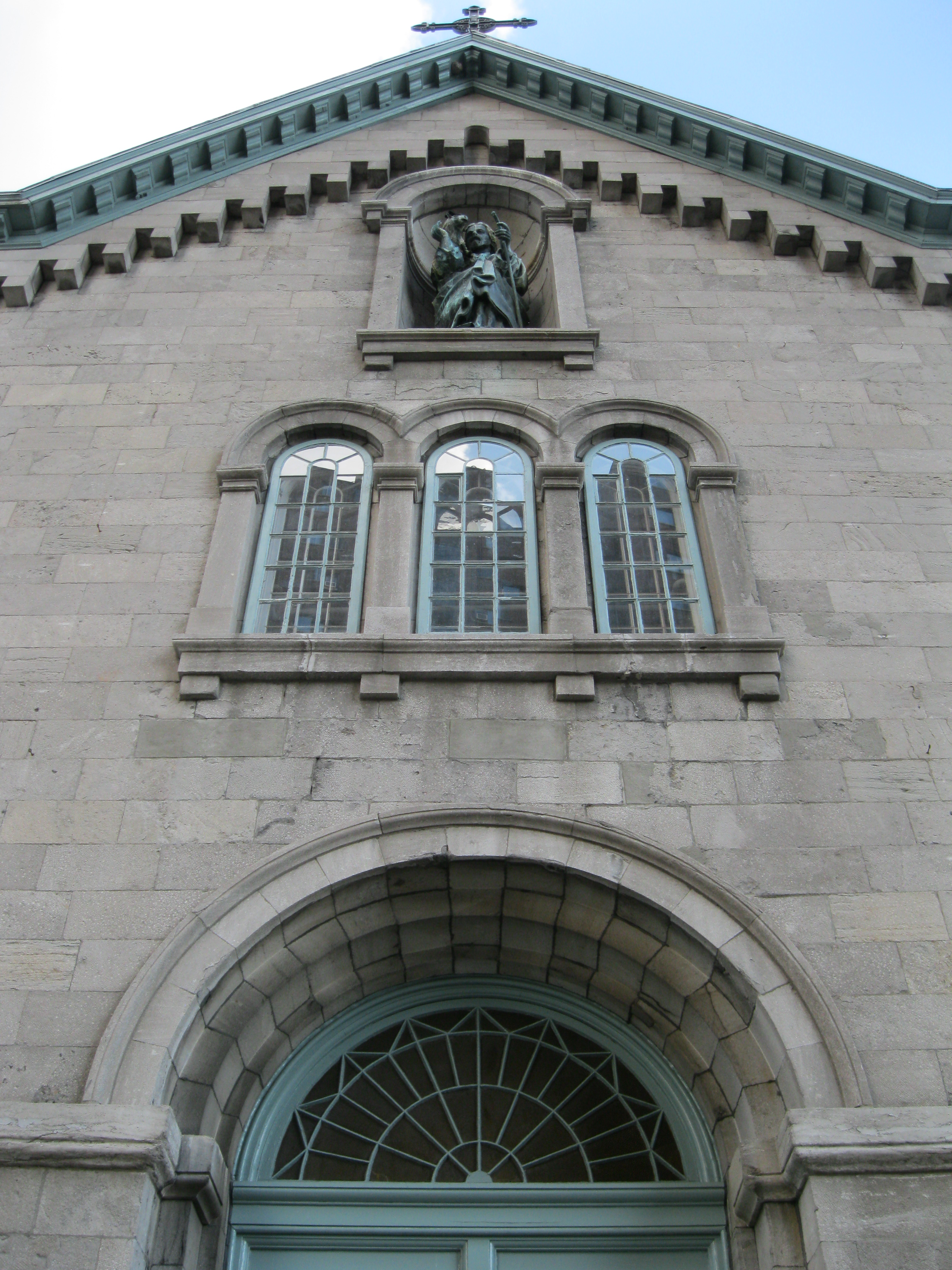
Close-up of the chapel.

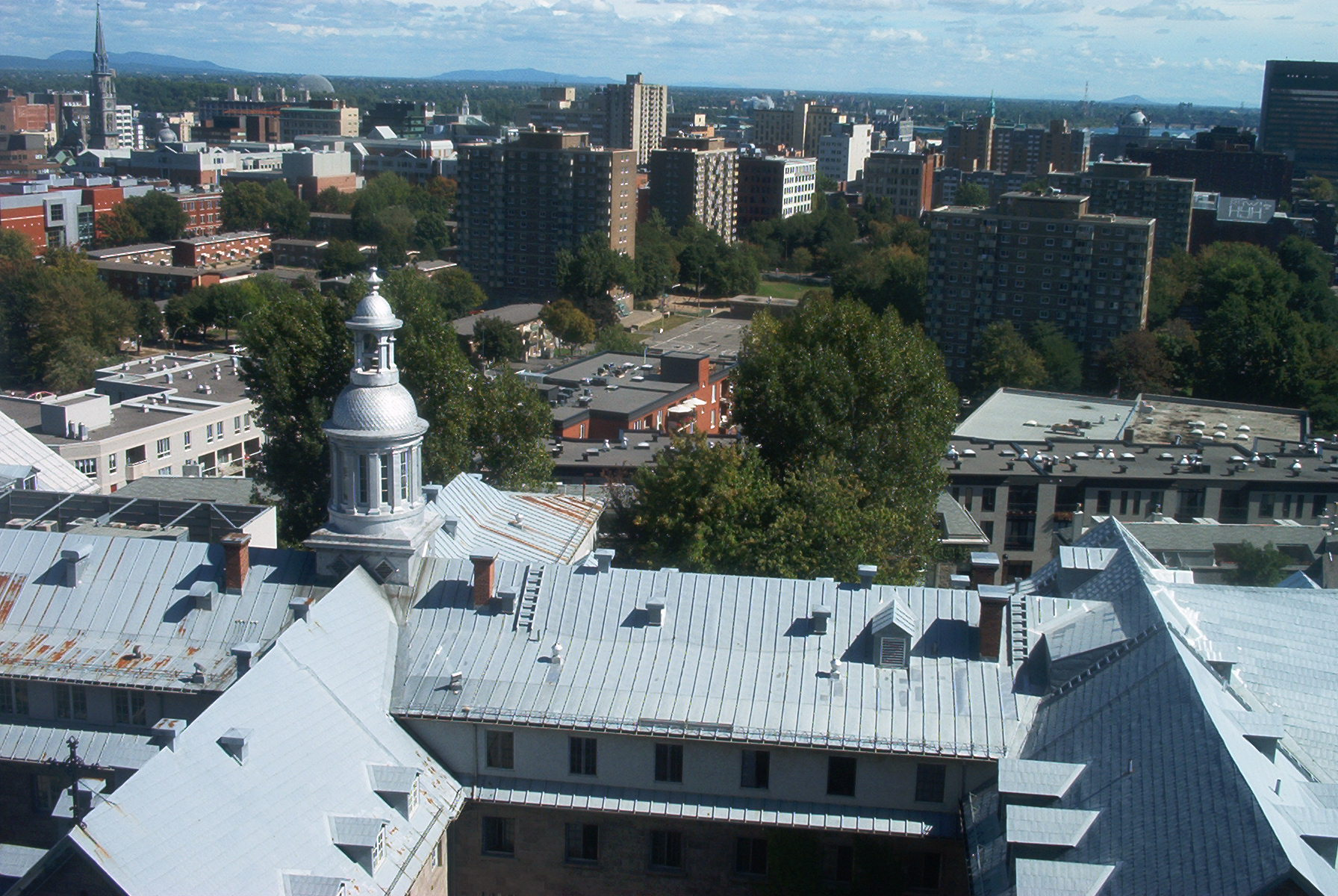
View of the roof of the monastery, looking south.

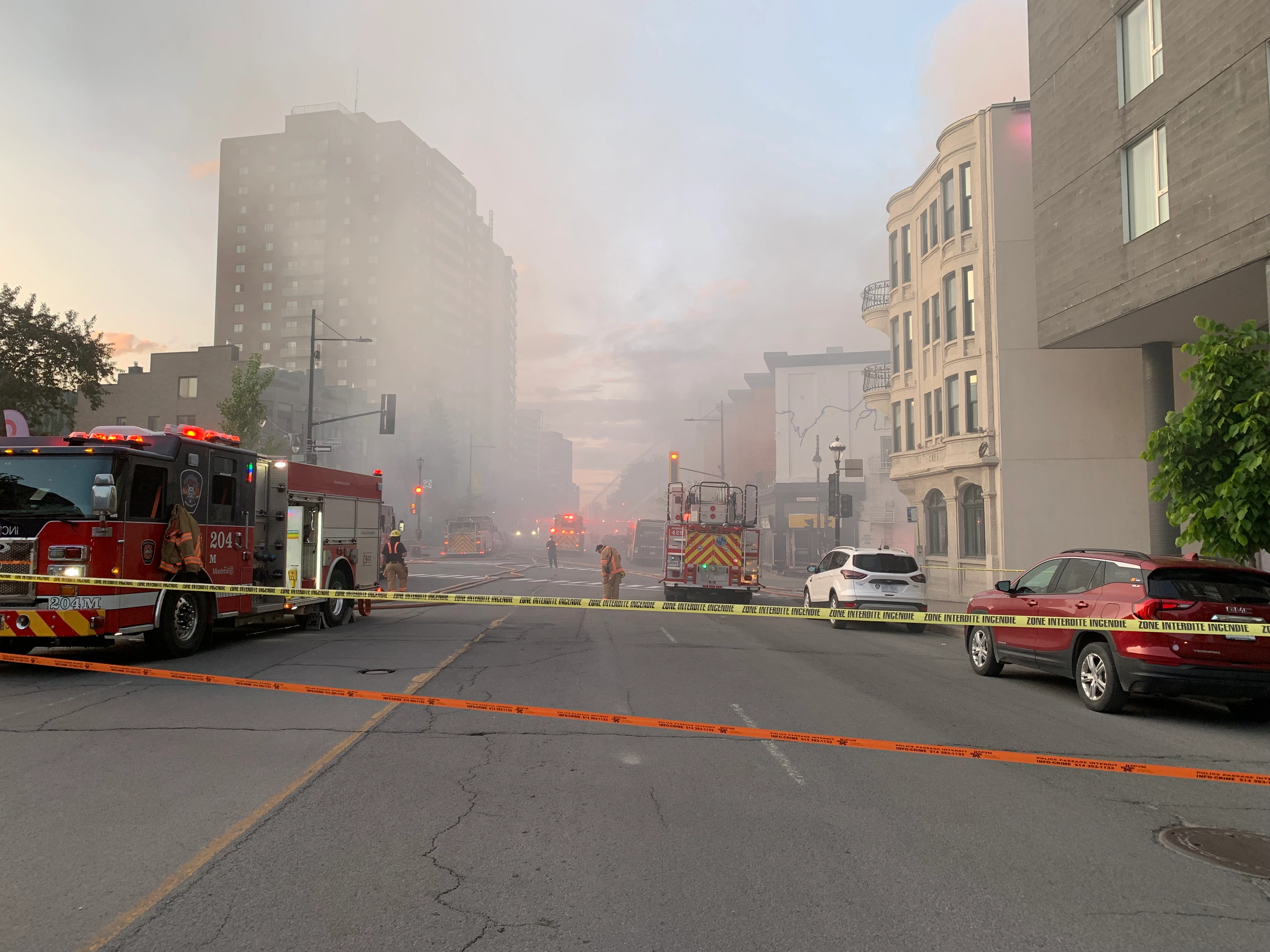
Extent of the smoke on Sherbrooke Street five hours after the start of the May 25, 2023, fire.

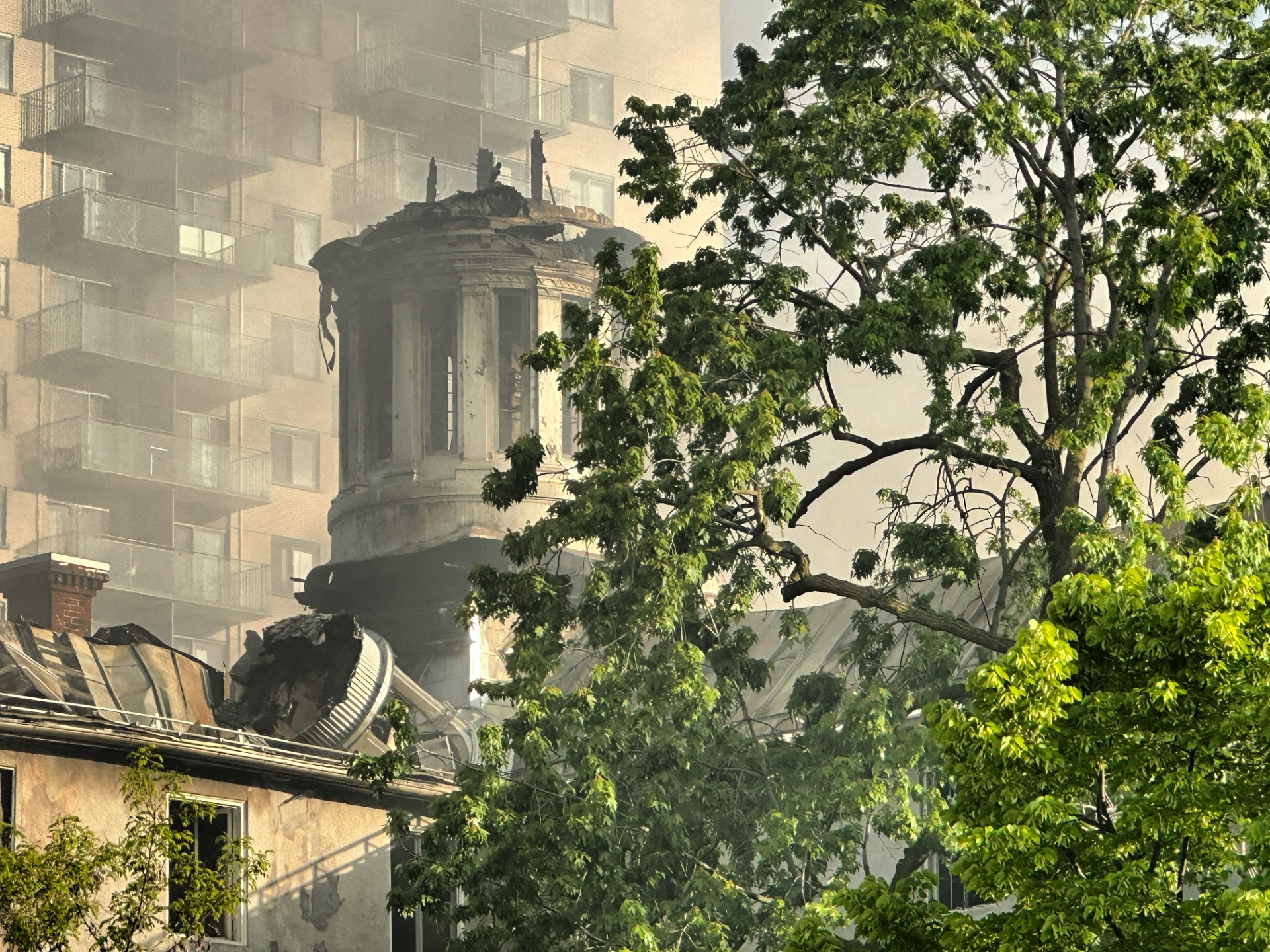
The Monastère du Bon-Pasteur on May 26, 2023, one day after the fire.

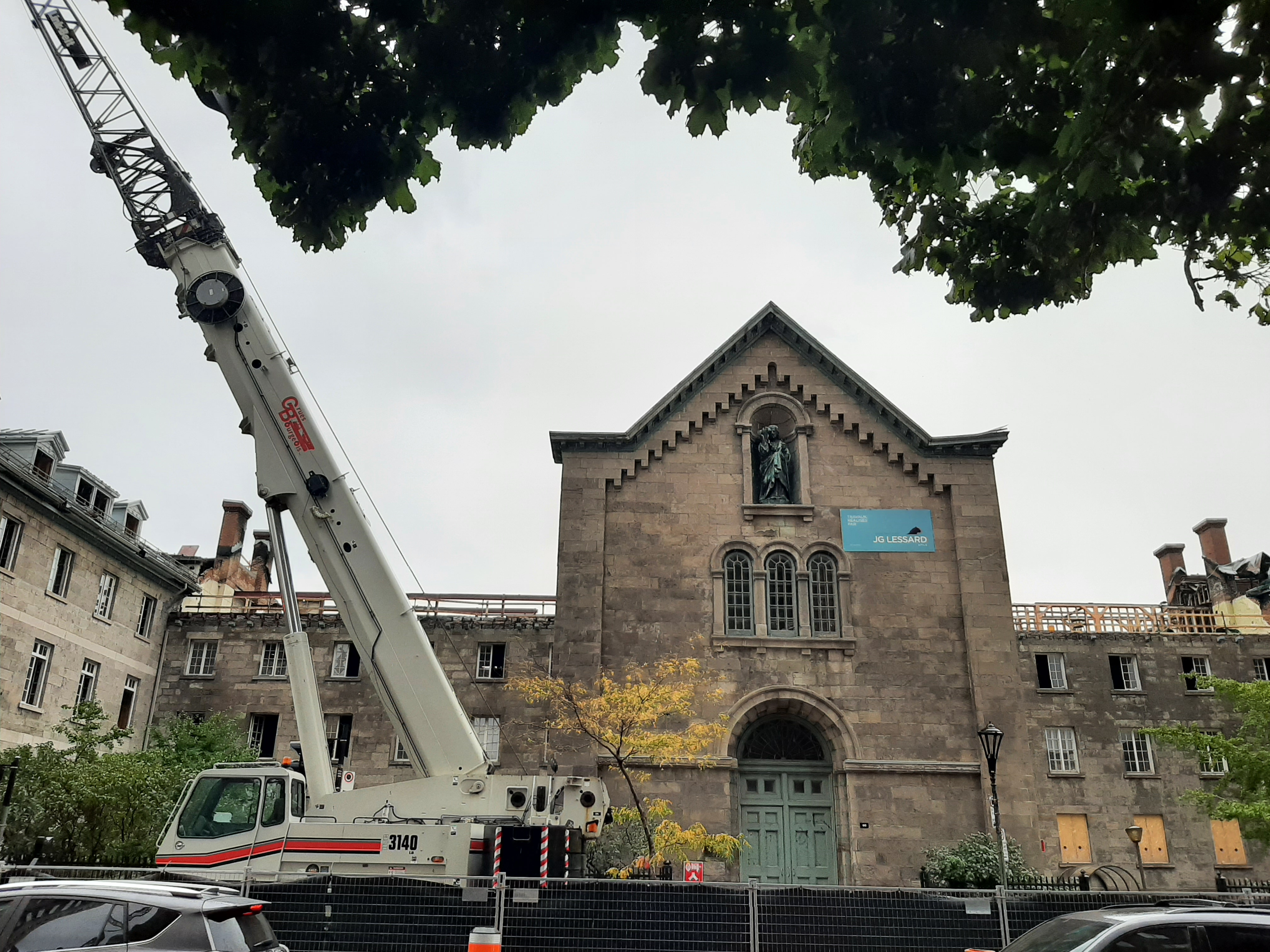
The roof damage wrought by the fire, nearly six months later, with construction cranes in the foreground.
