= Sainte-Marie, Montreal =

Quartier Sainte-Marie
- Neighbourhood
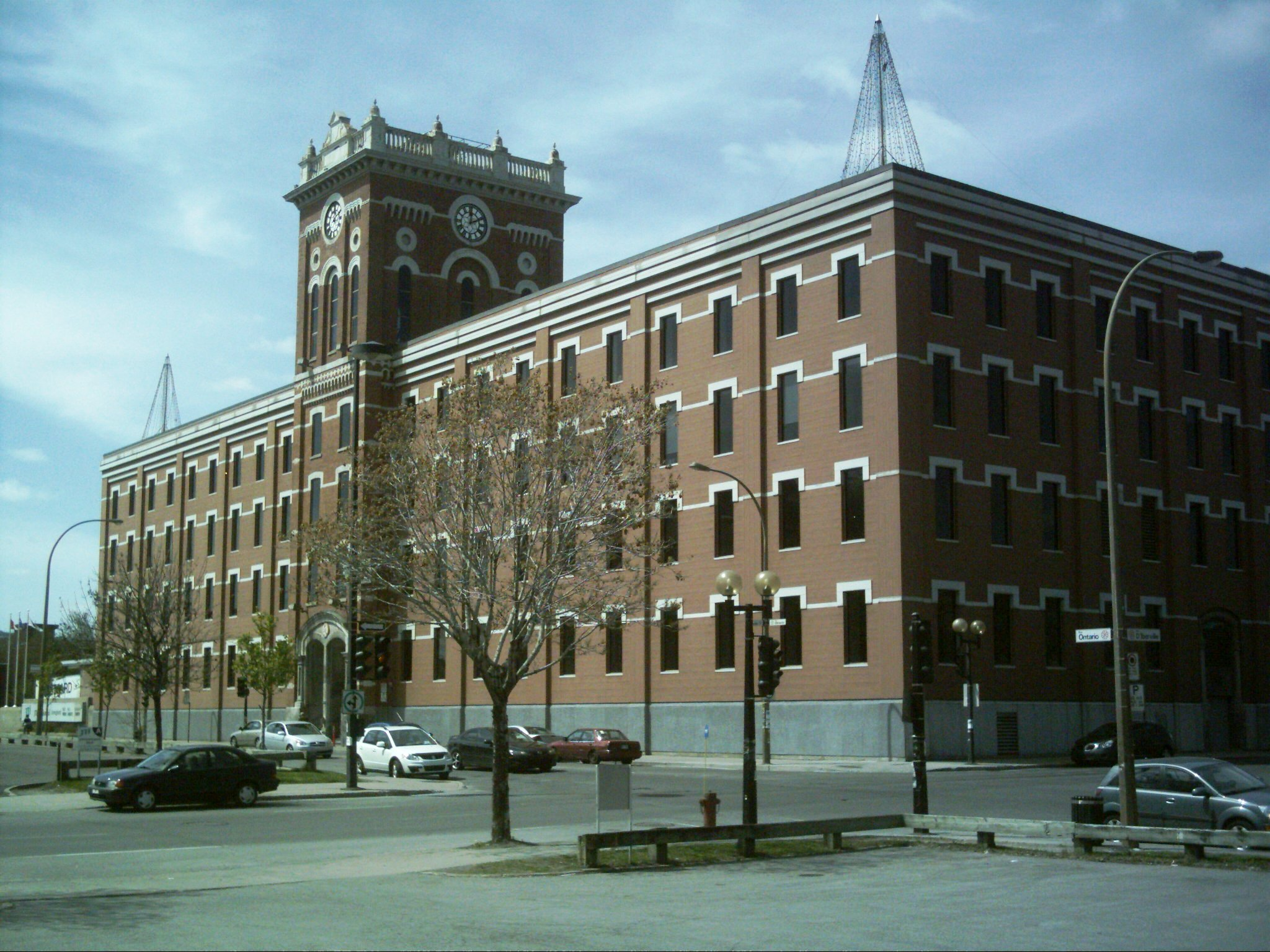
- The historic JTI MacDonald factory on Ontario Street

- Location within Montreal
- Coordinates: 45.52500°N 73.54550°W
- Country: Canada
- Province: Quebec
- City: Montreal
- Borough: Ville-Marie
- Postal code(s): H2K

The Sainte-Marie (French pronunciation: [sɛ̃t maʁi]) neighbourhood is located in the eastern edge of the Centre-Sud area, in the borough of Ville-Marie. The Jacques Cartier Bridge and Maison Radio-Canada overlook the neighbourhood.

== History ==
Prior to the construction of the Maison Radio-Canada, the area was part of the working-class neighborhood popularly known as Faubourg à m'lasse, demolished in the 1960s.

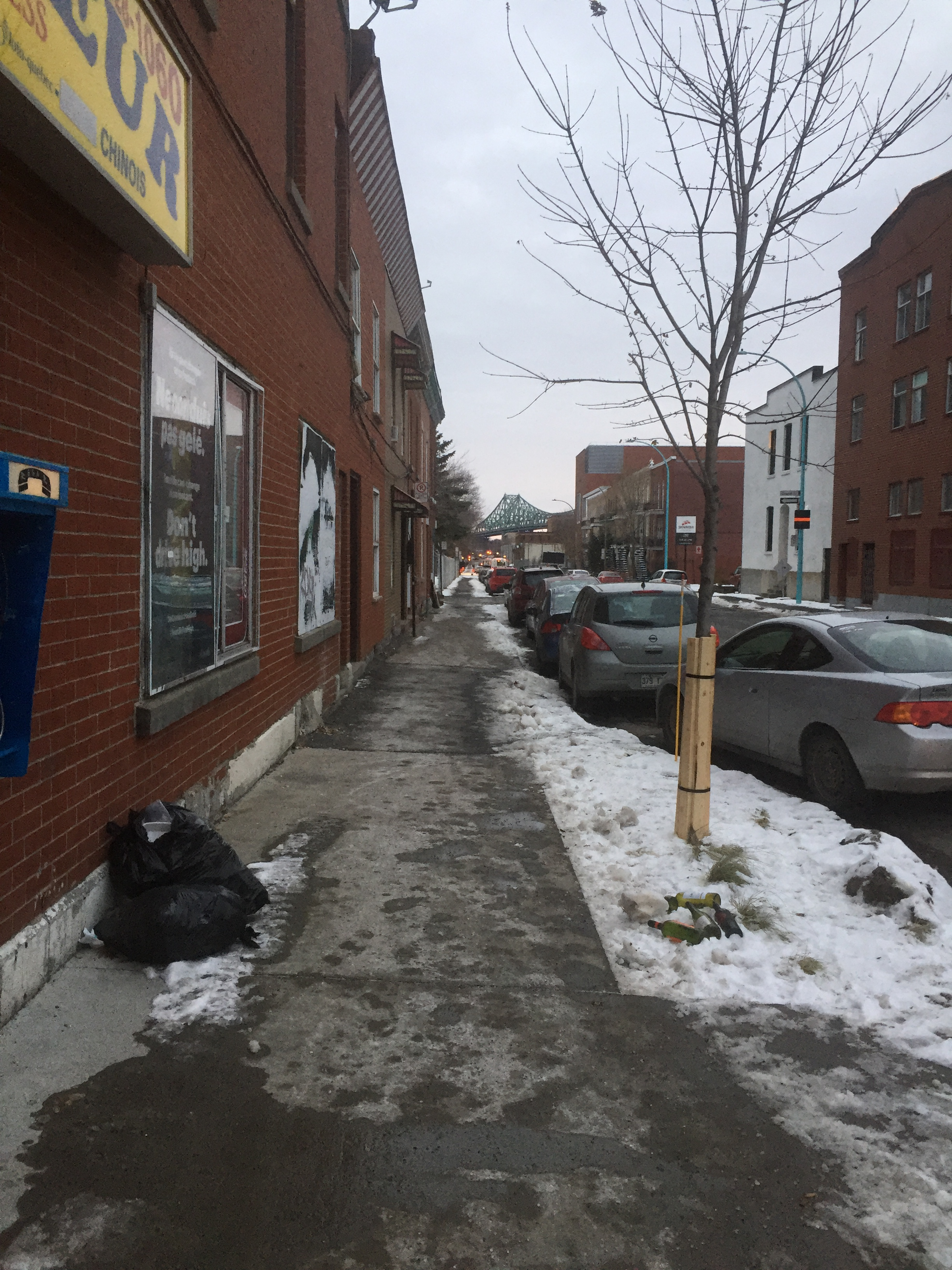
Sainte-Marie, looking south towards the Jacques Cartier bridge

Sainte-Marie, and the Centre-Sud more broadly, have a long held reputation for poverty, organized crime and prostitution casting the neighbourhood in a negative light.

This has notably changed in recent years, with increased gentrification.

== Geography ==
Sainte-Marie is part of the larger Centre-Sud, its boundaries are roughly De Lorimier Avenue to the west, the CP rails to the east, Sherbrooke Street to the north and the St. Lawrence River to the south.

The Sainte-Marie rapids separate Sainte-Marie from St. Helen's Island.

A notable landmark in the area is the JTI MacDonald tobacco company, which has been located on Ontario Street for many decades.

The Sûreté du Québec have their headquarters in the heart of the neighbourhood on Parthenais Street. The building commonly known as the Prison Parthenais, is prominent in the skyline.

== Politics ==
The neighbourhood is part of the Montreal City Council district of Sainte-Marie and the federal riding of Laurier—Sainte-Marie. Provincially it's part of Sainte-Marie–Saint-Jacques, with a small eastern corner in the Hochelaga-Maisonneuve riding, despite not being part of that neighbourhood.

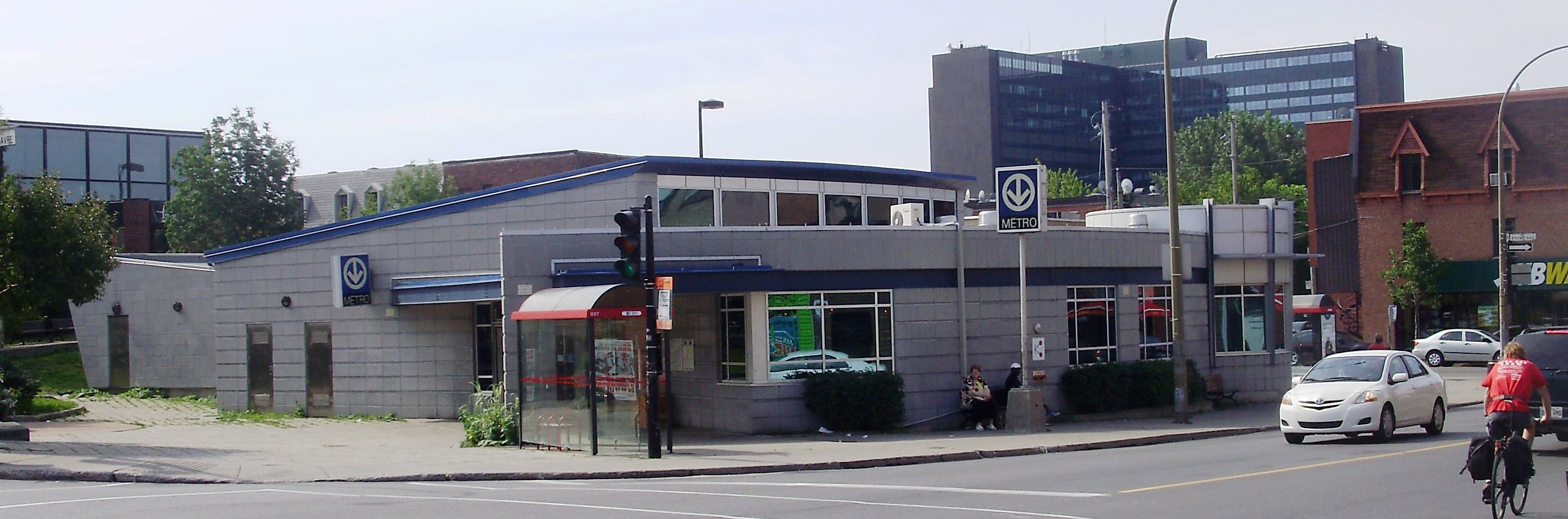
The area around the Frontenac station

== Transport ==
The area is served by the Montreal Metro station Frontenac.
