= Sexe de rue =

2003 film directed by Richard Boutet

- Directed by: Richard Boutet
- Written by: Richard Boutet
- Produced by: Bernard Lalonde, Richard Boutet (associate producer)
- Cinematography: Robert Vanherweghem
- Edited by: Claude Laflamme
- Music by: Franklyne; Christian Labbé; Vic Vogel
- Production company: Vent d'Est Films
- Distributed by: 7e Art Distribution
- Release dates: 4 September 2003 (WFF); 26 September 2003 (Quebec, Canada)
- Running time: 85 minutes
- Country: Canada
- Language: French
- Box office: CA$13,232 (Canada)

Sexe de rue (French pronunciation: [sɛksə də ʁy]; English: Street Sex) is a 2003 Canadian documentary film about the history and current conditions of street prostitutes in the Centre-Sud of Montreal, written, directed and co-produced by Richard Boutet, who died of a heart attack on 29 August 2003, a few days before the film's premiere at the Montreal World Film Festival. The largely first person documentary gives a voice to street workers, allowing them to tell their own stories in their own words. Prostitution is discussed as labour and in the context of local history and relevant sociological factors, including dangers.

== Synopsis ==
"Venereal infections acquired in the city of Montreal" 1943 map of Montreal brothels

Marie-Claude and Marianne work in a drop-in centre for drug addicts in Montréal. They tell their stories of working the streets of Centre-Sud. Marianne started when she was 16 years old and just served four years in prison for armed robbery after she stole a revolver from a "violent" customer, and now writes poetry as a way of dealing with her personal demons. Marie-Claude, a former drug addict and ex-sex worker, is an artist.

A former brothel owner and a local historian briefly describe the prostitution scene in the city since 1919. The former Red-Light District consisted of a part of Centre-Sud along Rue Sainte-Catherine and Rue Ontario. Georgette Lord, the former owner of the brothel (81 at the time of filming), tells the story of a young woman being initiated into the life as part of its history until the brothel was closed during the Second World War. Montréal jazz musician Vic Vogel provides further anecdotes from the time.

Le nord j'le perds, ma raison aussi
Et c'est la solitude du désert qui m'habite
Chaque jour je suis aux portes de l'enfer
Et seuls les ciels sombres du monde m'apaisent...
... Aujourd'hui il fait beau soleil
Mais je me rappelle ces jours de pluie
Et j'ai peur de faire de ma nouvelle liberté
Une prison mal famée

— From Alter Ego, a poem by Mariane Matte (Sexe de rue)

The area today remains at the centre of most street-based sex work, which may entail more than just sex: sex workers often listen to the client's troubles or even offer a shoulder to cry on. The next to tell their stories are: Valérie, a young woman caught in the vicious cycle of drugs, sex, and money (her own mother gave her her first "hit" at the age of 12), and LGBT sex workers Claudia, a pre-operative transsexual, Audrey, a transvestite, and Barbara, who self-identifies as a hermaphrodite. The latter three talk about their work like any other nine-to-five job, and, unlike any of the cisgender women interviewed, seem to enjoy their work. Claudia calls herself a putain respectueuse and 42-year-old Audrey assumes her role with "dignity", while Barbara considers herself "generous" in offering "everything", all demonstrating lucidity with respect to the profession. Light is also shed on street prostitution from the point of view of the car-driving customer.

Street prostitution is simultaneously the most visible, yet most hidden, and the most harsh (and dangerous) of all forms of sex work, yet no sex worker can truly rely on protection from the police, since what they do is outlawed, even though the act of exchanging money for sex itself is not illegal. Valérie tells of some police officers taking advantage of the situation, offering a quid pro quo consisting of sexual favours in exchange for avoiding a night in jail. Marianne loudly recites her poems aloud in the street, calling for prostitution to be decriminalized and for rights for sex workers.

== Production ==
=== Background ===
The subject of Sexe de rue was not entirely untrodden ground for Richard Boutet, whose previous works frequently focus on marginalized members of society, survivors of harsh conditions or victims of criminal enterprises. He was one of a few documentary filmmakers who, beginning in the 1970s, turned a critical eye toward social issues, and who, according to Odile Tremblay, never abandoned his principles. As early as 1973, Boutet offered a glimpse of a relationship between sex work and drug addiction in his documentary, Suzanne et Lucie, about two exotic dancers with a heroin habit.

=== Development and filming ===
The documentary was filmed in the Downtown Montreal and Centre-Sud areas, the interviews taking place over three years, two years of which consisted of intensive research undertaken by assistant director Nicole Chaput, who was Boutet's wife. They worked together on his previous documentary, Survivants de l'Apocalypse (1998), about cult escapees. The working title of Sexe de rue was Prostituées en quête de dignité (Prostitutes in Search of Dignity).

The documentary was made using DVCAM.

Gabriel Bissonnette interviewed subjects Marie-Claude and Marianne after the film was released, asking them what they thought of the experience, and about seeing themselves on the big screen. Marianne was particularly impressed by the crew's sensitivity, although it was hard to see herself in the film, as she was undergoing a relapse at the time, while Marie-Claude found that making the film gave her a sort of closure with respect to her past, even though being on the street during the shooting sometimes reminded her of it in such a way that she sometimes almost felt like going back to it.

=== Music ===
The film's original score was composed and performed by Franklyne, Christian Labbé, and Vic Vogel, who composed and performed the music for the historical part of the documentary.

Boutet always considered music to be an important part of his documentaries, and co-wrote the lyrics to the first song on the soundtrack, "Les putes".

== Release ==
The film had its world premiere at the Montréal World Film Festival, screening on 4, 5, and 6 September 2003, where it won the award for Best Documentary. It was screened again almost immediately at the 18th Festival international du film de Québec. It went on general release at the Cinéma Parallèle (Ex-Centris) from 26 September to 8 October, and then at independent theatres the week of the 15th. Memorial screenings of Sexe de rue, along with other films by Boutet, took place at the 6th Montreal International Documentary Festival, in November.

=== Home media ===
Sexe de rue was released on both VHS and DVD formats by the film's distributor in late 2003.

== Reception ==
=== Commercial performance ===
The film was the third-highest grossing documentary film in Canada in 2003, collecting $13,232 in box office receipts, according to data from the Motion Picture Theatres Association of Canada.

=== Critical response ===
Bruno Dubuc calls Sexe de rue a sensitive portrait of the world's oldest profession as it has been practiced in south-central Montréal; "raw and disturbing" (cru et dérangeant), and valuable for the way it upsets any preconceived notions the viewer might have, both about the motivations of sex workers and the attitudes of the police towards them, as well as the ordinarily hidden sex lives of the car-driving customers. Writing for L'Itinéraire, Gabriel Bissonnette welcomed the documentary as a rare instance of an unprejudiced, sympathetic light being shed on those who work the street, avering that the film's scenes scream truth (criantes de vérité). Odile Tremblay, writing for Le Devoir, embraced what she saw as the documentary's plea for the decriminalization of "solicitation", and for rights for the vulnerable street prostitutes, and against a hypocritical society. She described its cinematographic aesthetic in terms of the street itself being a leitmotif in good or bad weather, the customers in their cars, the prostitutes' apartments, and, of course, the needle (remarking earlier that about 10% of the 5000 or so sex workers in Montréal are thought to have a drug habit, and further, they never know if a new customer is a potential threat).

Both Bissonnette and Tremblay were personally moved by the stories told by the sex workers themselves, particularly Marie-Claude and Marianne, whom she calls a revolutionary poet whose acid words are like war cries, or wails of suffering (Marianne, poétesse révoltée qui lance ses mots acides comme des cris de guerre et de douleur). Bissonnette admires their courage of these "extraordinary" women for letting the crew into the most intimate part of their lives. He was also touched by Claudia's story, and captivated and overwhelmed by Valérie's.

=== Accolades ===
- Best Documentary Film Award, Montréal World Film Festival, 2003 ("Golden Zenith for the Best Documentary Film"; French: Zénith d’or du meilleur film documentaire)
- Prix des camelots, L'Itinéraire (a Montréal-based magazine dedicated to social issues), 2003
