= Beaudry station =

Montreal Metro station

Beaudry
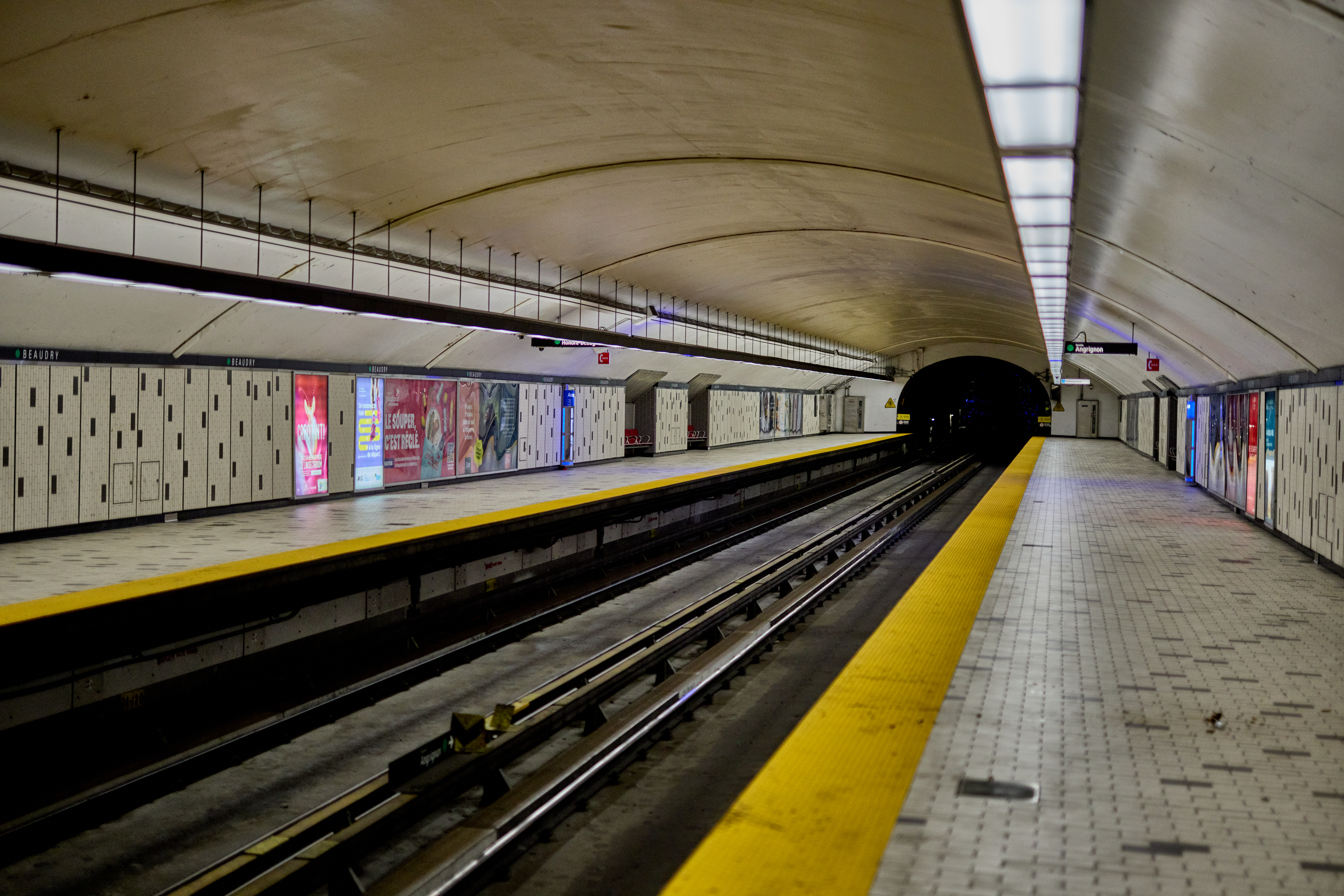

General information
- Location: 1255, rue Ste-Catherine Est; Montreal, Quebec H2L 2H2; Canada
- Coordinates: 45°31′08″N 73°33′21″W
- Operator: Société de transport de Montréal
- Platforms: 2 side platforms
- Tracks: 2
- Connections: STM bus

Construction
- Depth: 25.9 metres (85 feet), 4th deepest
- Accessible: No
- Architect: Adalbert Niklewicz; Béïque, Thout, Legault (new kiosk built in 1999)

Other information
- Fare zone: ARTM: A

History
- Opened: 21 December 1966
- Rebuilt: 2018-19

Passengers
- 2024: 1,220,046 ▲2.94%
- Rank: 67 of 68

Services
| Preceding station | Montreal Metro | Following station |
|---|---|---|
| Berri–UQAM toward Angrignon | Green Line | Papineau toward Honoré-Beaugrand |
Location

Beaudry (French pronunciation: [bodʁi]) is a Montreal Metro station in the borough of Ville-Marie, in Montreal, Quebec, Canada. It is operated by the Société de transport de Montréal (STM) and serves the Green Line. It is in Montreal's Gay Village, part of the Centre-Sud district. Although part of the original network of the Metro, it opened two months after the rest of the network, on December 21, 1966.

== Overview ==
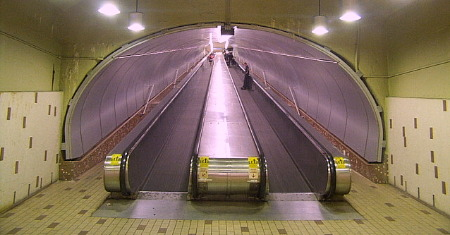
The inclined moving sidewalks inside the station.

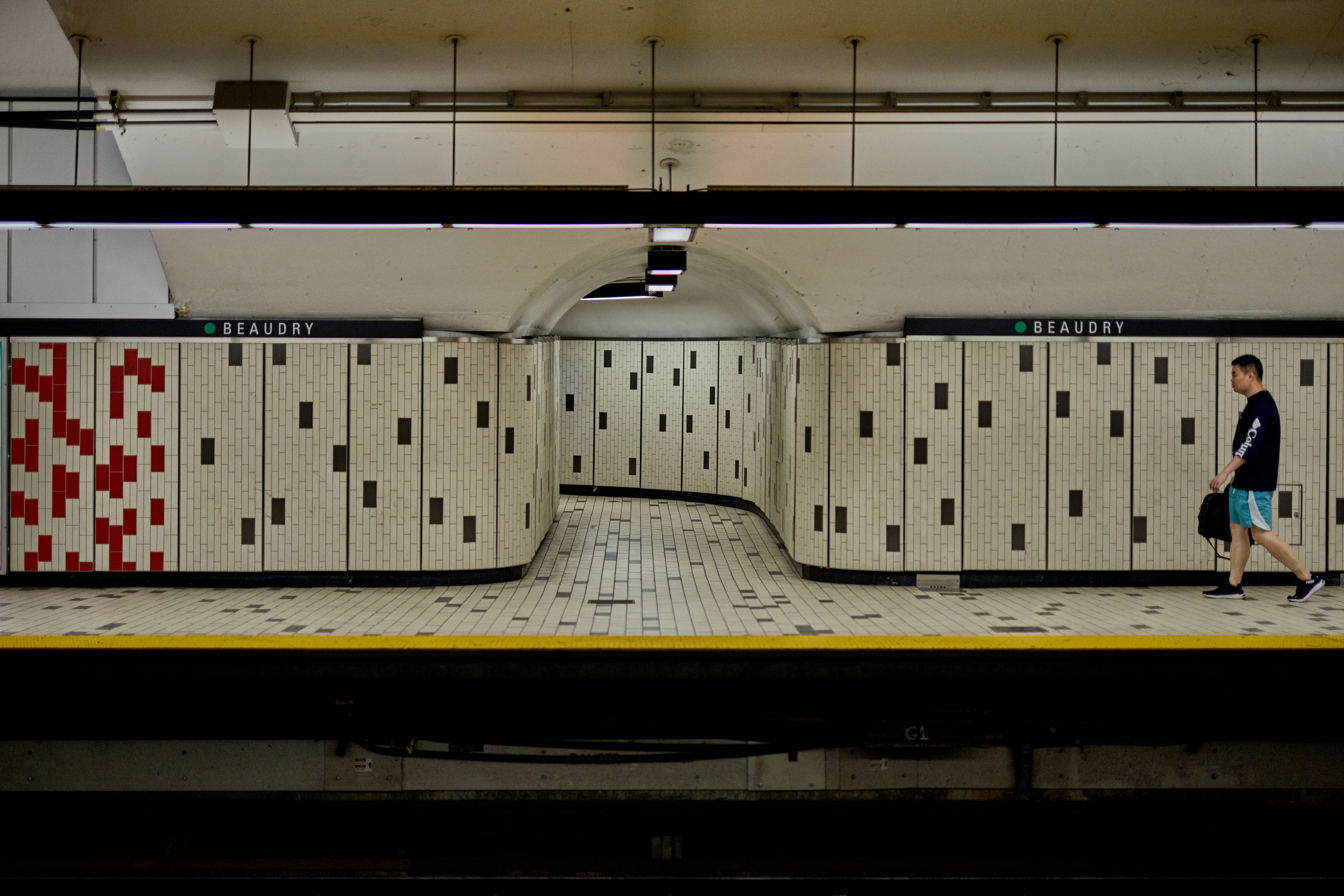
The station's platform.

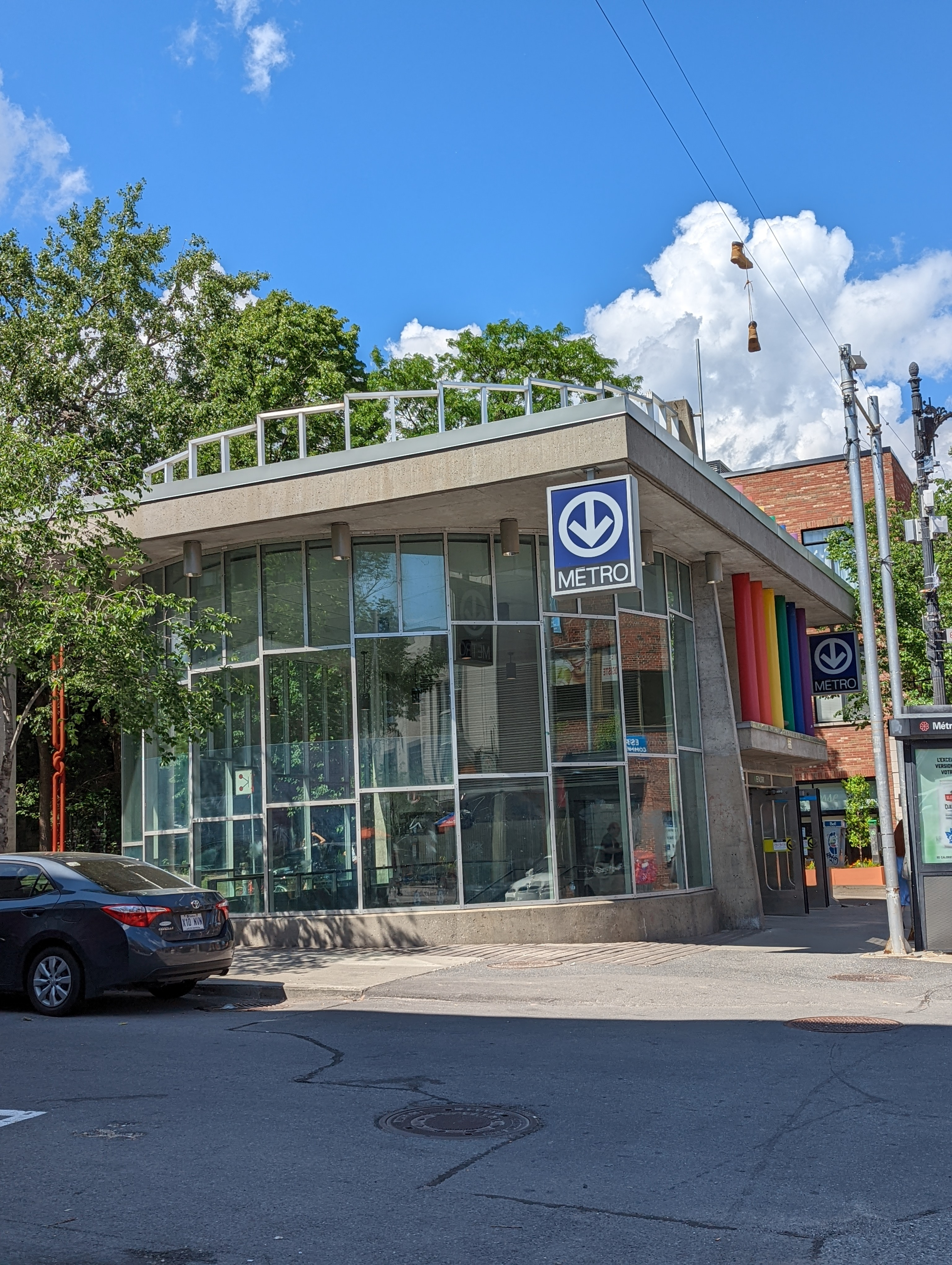
Outside view of Beaudry Metro station

Designed by Adalbert Niklewicz, it is a normal side platform station, built in-tunnel; a transept leads to a long inclined moving sidewalk, the only one of its kind in the Metro, traversing the distance between De Maisonneuve Boulevard and Saint Catherine Street, on which the entrance is located. The moving sidewalk has been a burden to the STM because it is unique and so replacement parts must be custom-built.

The walls in the entrance building, ticket hall, passage to the platforms, and transept area were updated in a stylish light slate blue and stainless steel scheme. The platform is covered in a cream-and-brown tile pattern, but in 1999, part of the walls near the exits were redone during renovations into a pattern of blue tiles and stainless steel.

== Renovations ==
In October 2018, the station was temporarily closed for renovations for 8 months, as part of a significant renovation that would take 18 months to complete fully. Unlike at Honoré-Beaugrand and the adjacent Berri–UQAM, which remained partly or wholly open during their recent renovations, "a complete closure was necessary" for the renovations to take place, according to STM spokesperson Amélie Régis, as the station only had a sole entrance. Beaudry's closure was the first time that a metro station closed completely for renovations since Beaubien station closed for four months in the spring of 2015. Shuttle buses were provided during the closure to facilitate transport between the station and its two neighbouring stations, Berri–UQAM and Papineau.

The station reopened, as scheduled, on June 3, 2019. Since then, work has been continued to replace the wall on the platform. The renovation has been completed in 2020.

== Architecture and art ==
The station was renovated and partially redecorated in the Réno-Métro program in 1999. Part of this work included a large new glassed-in entrance building by Béïque, Thuot, and Legault; a unique part of its design are rainbow-coloured masts over the door, an homage to Montreal's large gay and lesbian neighbourhood, the Village (Village gai), which the station serves. These were created by Jacques Thibault.

== Origin of the name ==
The station is named for Beaudry Street. Pierre Beaudry (1774–1848) was the landowner across whose farm the street was opened; he also donated the land on which the Saint-Pierre-Apôtre Church was built.

== Connecting bus routes ==
Société de transport de Montréal
| No. | Route | Connects to | Service times / notes |
|---|---|---|---|
| 14 | Atateken | Laurier; Champ-de-Mars | Daily |

== Nearby points of interest ==
- The Village
- Maison Radio-Canada
- Écomusée du fier monde
- Hôpital Notre-Dame
