= Deluxxx =

Studio album by Atach Tatuq
- Released: October 4, 2005
- Genre: Hip hop
- Length: 63:47
- Languages: French, English
- Labels: Anubis (Canada); ANUCD001 (CD)

Atach Tatuq chronology
La guerre des tuqs (2002)	Deluxxx (2005)

Singles from Deluxxx
- 1. "Australie"; 2. "Plastiq doré" 3. "Trop d'shit" 4. "Chips"

Professional ratings
Review scores
Source	Rating
Bande à part	(7.3/10)
HHQC	4/5 stars
HipHopFranco	(favorable)
Hour	3.5/5 stars
Voir	4/5 stars

Deluxxx is Atach Tatuq's last studio album released on October 4, 2005. The album won the award for the Hip hop album of the year category at the Félix Awards in 2006.

== Track listing ==
1. "Deluxxx 0001"
2. "Deluxxx"
3. "1-2..." (featuring DJ Nerve)
4. "Bags of Smile" (featuring Wyzah)
5. "Exer6 de style"
6. "Du monde comme nous"
7. "Me fume 2 joints"
8. "Chips"
9. "Pense-zi"
10. "Sex, Drug, Rap'N Roll"
11. "Kiss These"
12. "L'homme déçu / HD00"
13. "La symphonie d'ma discorde intérieure"
14. "Dans mon bout' ça niaise pas"
15. "Me fume du crack"
16. "Geahh Fool!" (featuring Die When)
17. "What Are Friendz For?!" (featuring Loe Pesci)
18. "Plastiq doré"
19. "Diapos"
20. "Australie" (featuring Lee)
21. "Chambre à gaz Feng Shui"
