= Vic Vogel =

Canadian musician (1935–2019)

Victor Stefan Vogel (August 3, 1935 – September 16, 2019) was a Canadian jazz pianist, composer, arranger, trombonist, and conductor.

== Biography ==
Vogel was born in 1935 to Hungarian parents living in Montreal. He began playing the piano at the age of five after watching his older brother play. He also taught himself to play trombone (from age 19), tuba, and vibraphone, and to arrange music.

At 14, he began working occasionally in Montreal nightclubs, and did a CBC radio broadcast, while repairing cars to earn money.

In the mid-1950s he studied piano and music theory with Michel Harvey in Montreal, and took lesson from Lennie Tristano in New York City.

Vogel became a full-time professional musician in the late 1950s, and through the 1960s worked as both a sideman and bandleader in nightclubs, and eventually in radio and TV studios. He played in a Montreal big band and later a nonet led by Steve Garrick, and honed his arranging skills by writing for various bands, including Garrick's and Al Nichols's.

In 1961, he accompanied on piano the Double Six of Paris, for concerts in the province of Quebec, and, in 1966 led a group of Montreal jazz musicians on a tour of Europe organized by Radio Canada. In 1968, with the dissolution of the Gagnon nonet, Vogel formed his own jazz orchestra, which remained active, including concerts, tours, recordings, and regular Monday night rehearsals, until his death.

Vogel was a central figure on the Montreal music scene, moving freely among jazz, pop, and occasionally symphonic assignments. He was the music director for many CBC/Radio-Canada variety shows, and composed the scores for CBC and CTV news programs, National Film Board documentaries, and other films. He wrote and conducted the music for the opening ceremonies of both the 1968 Man and His World exposition in Montreal, and the 1976 Olympics in Montreal, and for the half-time shows at the Grey Cup in 1981 and 1985.

He shared the stage with many great names of jazz and popular music, including Tony Bennett, Mel Tormé, Eartha Kitt, Andy Williams, Ann-Margret, Paul Anka, Sammy Davis Jr., Jerry Lewis, Shirley MacLaine, Tennessee Ernie Ford, and Michel Legrand.

Vogel performed at every Montreal International Jazz Festival since it began in 1980 until 2015 when he missed his farewell show due to illness.

His band’s tour and recording with Quebec rocker band Offenbach resulted in the Offenbach en fusion LP that received the Félix Award as rock album of 1980. After several gold and platinum albums, he released his first piano solo album in 1993 consisting mostly of original material; it was nominated for Juno and Félix awards.

His solo and smaller ensemble projects included arranging and conducting the European Jazz Youth Orchestra in tribute to Oscar Peterson’s 80th birthday. Vogel also arranged and conducted music for ceremonies at Expo 67, the Canada Games in 1985, For the Olympics he arranged welcoming and theme songs from excerpts of works by André Mathieu.

In 2007, he was the subject of the feature-length documentary film, "The Brass Man" (L'homme de Cuivre), and on November 1, 2010, he was awarded an honorary doctorate degree in Music from Concordia University.

Vogel died on September 16, 2019, at the age of 84.

== Discography ==
- 1976 — Olympique 1976
- 1980 — En Fusion (with Offenbach)
- 1982 — Vic Vogel Big Band
- 1987 — Vic Vogel and the Awesome Big Band
- 1990 — Le Big Band
- 1994 — Piano solo
- 1995 — Au revoir et merci (with Les Jérolas)
- 1999 — Je me souviens ... mon piano
- 1999 — Live — Le Jazz Big Band
- 2000 — Montréal Jazz & Blues
- 2001 — Montréal Jazz & Blues Plus (double CD/CD-ROM)
- 2004 — Hangin' Loose
- 2004 — Awesome!
- 2004 — Los Boleros Holguineros (with Alfredo Chiquitin Morales)
- 2005 — Until I Met You (with Johanne Blouin)
- 2005 — Hommage à Oscar Peterson
- 2005 — Jazz Les Folles Nuits de Montréal (with various artists)
- 2005 — Rose Rouge (with Johanne Blouin)
- 2005 — Rose Rose (with Johanne Blouin)
- 2006 — 1+1=2
- 2007 — Je joue mon piano (CD + 2DVD)
- 2012 — Piano et la voix (with Martin Deschamps)
- 2008 — Jim & Andy's
- 2008 — Les Jalouses du Blues (with Offenbach and Alys Robi)
- 2012 — Nostalgie des Fêtes (with Martin Deschamps)

Vic Vogel also made several 33 1/3 and 45 RPM recordings before 1976.

== See also ==
- Who's Who of Jazz in Montreal: Ragtime to 1970, John Gilmore, Véhicule Press, 1989, ISBN 0-919890-92-X
