= Atach Tatuq =

Canadian hip hop group

Atach Tatuq was a Canadian hip hop group from Montreal, consisting of musicians DJ Naes, Égypto (Fisdelhom), 1-2 d'Piq, L'Intrus (Jim Lee), Virus, Dee, Khyro, R.U., Casco, Arnak and Haikai. The group's music contains lyrics in both English and French.

== History ==
Originally known as Traumaturges, the group was formed in 1998 by Rass, Égypto, L'Intrus, Khyro et DJ Naes, and released its first album, Suce mon index (Suck My Index Finger) in 2000. The group evolved into Atach Tatuq, which literally translates to "Attach Your Beanie" (a Québécois expression used before embarking on an intense and unpredictable venture), in 2001 when the remaining musicians joined the collective. In 2002 Atach Tatuq released the album La guerre des Tuqs (The War of the Tuqs).

Their album Deluxxx, which contained elements of funk and jazz, won the Félix Award for Hip Hop Album of the Year in 2006.

== Discography ==
- Suce mon index (2000, as Traumaturges)
- La guerre des Tuqs (2002)
- Deluxxx (2005)
