= Faubourg à m'lasse =

Le Faubourg à m'lasse (French pronunciation: [fobuʁ a mlas]) was a neighborhood in Montreal until 1963. The neighborhood was bordered by Dorchester Boulevard (now René-Lévesque Boulevard) to the North, Wolfe Street to the West, Viger Avenue to the South, and Papineau Avenue to the East.

== Etymology ==
The neighbourhood was originally named "Faubourg Québec" (English: "Quebec suburb") because it is located along the route to Quebec City. In the neighbourhood's later life, it received the nickname it is most commonly associated with today, Le Faubourg à m'lasse. The neighbourhood most likely received its nickname from the sweet smell that came from massive metal barrels containing molasses located near the Molson Brewery and Canadian Rubber plant.

There are many myths and legends attributed to the neighbourhood's nickname and people such as Jason Cundy acknowledge that some of them are quite implausible but are re-told because those were the tales they grew up believing. One of the legends states that in the warmer months, when the port saw shipments from far and exotic places, women would anticipate the shipments of molasses. When they knew of an upcoming shipment, they would go to the docks and bring a small container with them. Apparently, there was this unspoken understanding between a particular crane operator at the time and the women. The crane operator would "accidentally" drop the last barrel of molasses and the women would quickly fill their containers with the fallen substance.

== History ==
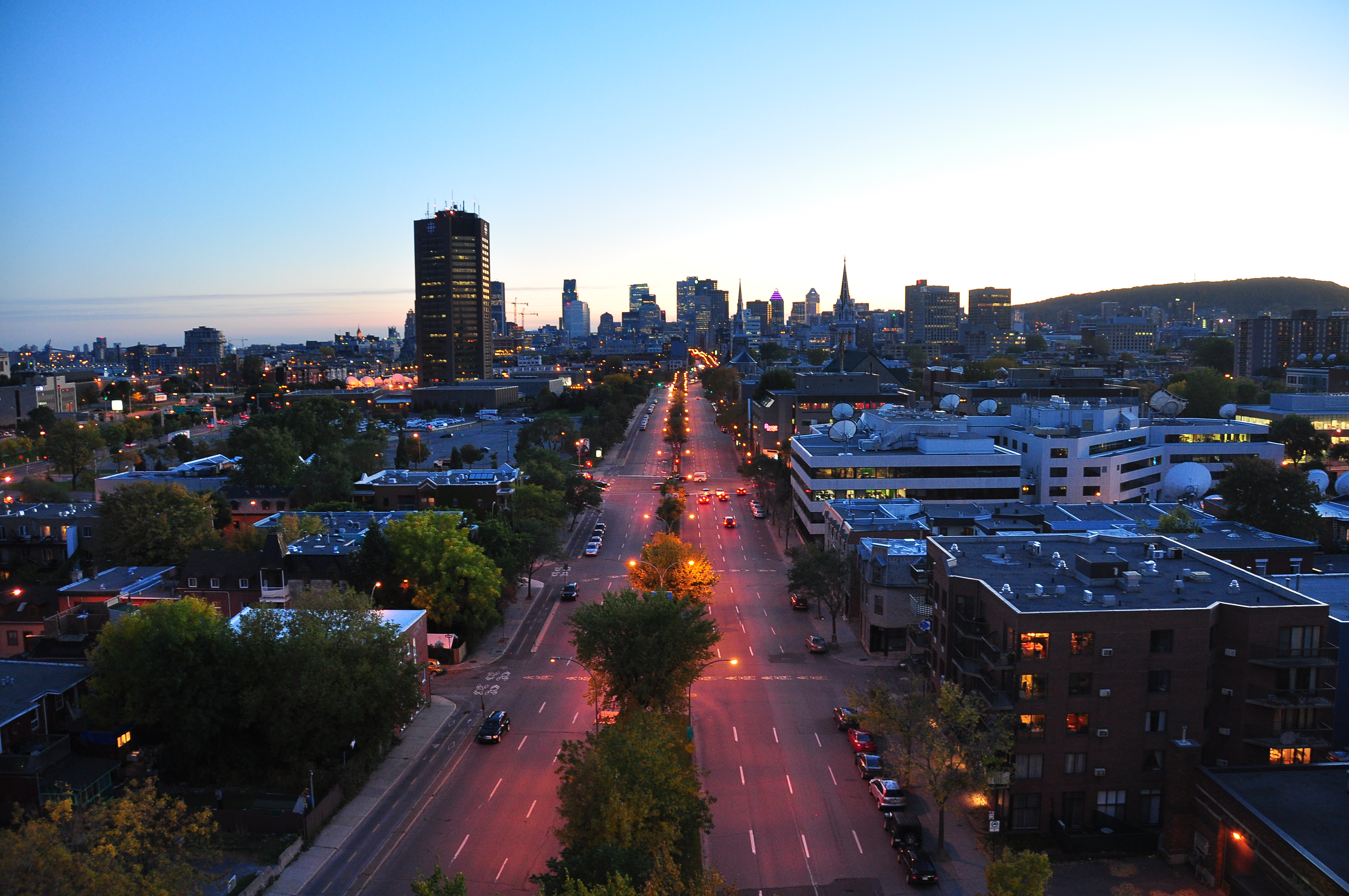
Boulevard René-Lévesque (formerly Dorchester Boulevard) was widened in 1955 as part of the destruction of the Faubourg à m'lasse. The tall building on the left is the Maison Radio-Canada.

In 1963, the neighbourhood was one of the oldest in the city when it was razed in order to construct Maison Radio-Canada. The destruction of whole neighbourhoods was not a rare occurrence in Montreal during the 1950s and 1960s. Montreal, during this time period, was on the mend. It was facing a serious decline in its economy after the Second World War and due to various phases of de-industrialization. In the nineteenth century, Montreal was the "uncontested metropolis of Canada" as it was one of North America's main industrial cities and financial centres. Montreal's reputation started to decline as early as the 1890s and this affected the city's urban makeup. Over the next six decades, Montreal's downtown would move further and further away from the water and whole parts of the old city were deemed "obsolete and unrecoverable." To add to all this, by the late 1950s, Montreal's port was no longer Canada's maritime terminal. Trucking was becoming the more popular medium for shipping goods and Ontario was at the head of automobile production. Since shipping by boat and train was becoming less in demand, Montreal's economy suffered, as they were one of the leaders in manufacturing railway equipment. American and international investment firms began to favour Toronto, which soon replaced Montreal as Canada's financial capital.

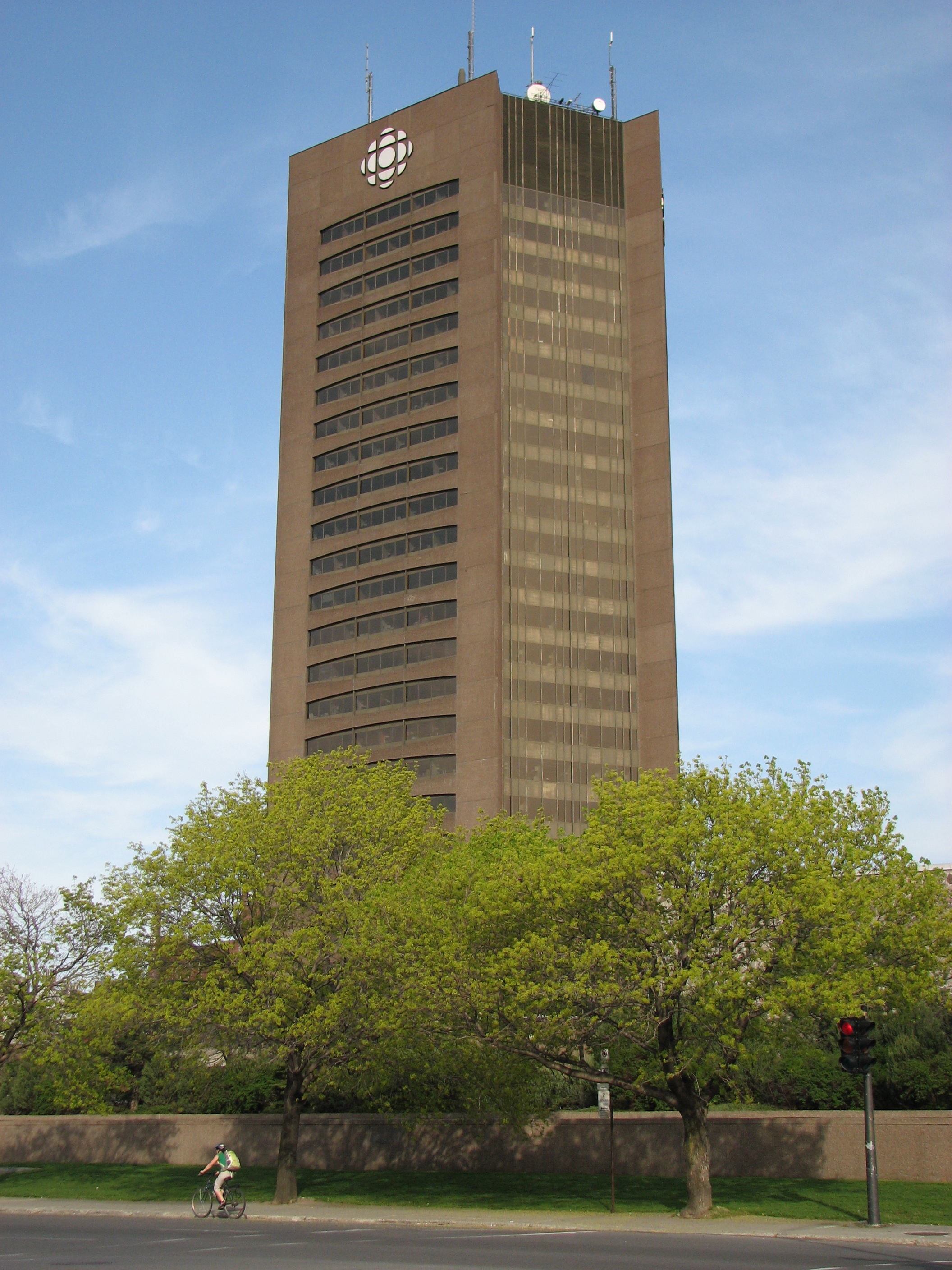
The monolithic Maison Radio-Canada in the Faubourg à m'lasse

All of these factors contributed to Montreal's economic issues in the late 1950s. Jean Drapeau — mayor of Montreal from 1954 to 1957 and again from 1960 to 1986 — made it his mission to raise Montreal to its previous status as one of North America's leading cities and make it a "world-renowned modern metropolis." He believed he could do so by boosting Montreal's international reputation through promoting mega-projects and endorsing world-stage events. Some of these mega-projects included building better traffic routes in order to support the popularization of the automobile, constructing public and private highrises, establishing parking lots and creating the subway system. Some of the world-stage events Drapeau would endorse included Expo 67 (the 1967 World's Fair) and the 1976 Summer Olympics.

The mega-project which required the destruction of the Faubourg à m'lasse was Maison Radio-Canada. Television and broadcasting was becoming ever more popular and Radio-Canada, the French language arm of the Canadian Broadcasting Corporation, wanted to centralize its location and create a building that would suit technologically up-to-date equipment. Jean Drapeau was a supporter of the project, as he envisioned the creation of a Cité des ondes (Media City), which would house all major French-language broadcasting corporations. In order to realize this project, 5000 residents were evicted; in addition, 12 grocery stores, 13 restaurants, about 20 factories and many suitable lodgings were destroyed.

== See also ==
- The Quiet Revolution and the Modernization of Montreal
- Municipal Politics during the Quiet Revolution
- Present Day Neighborhoods in Montreal
- History of Montreal
