= Maison de Radio-Canada =

Skyscraper in Montreal

Coordinates: 45.517981°N 73.551021°W

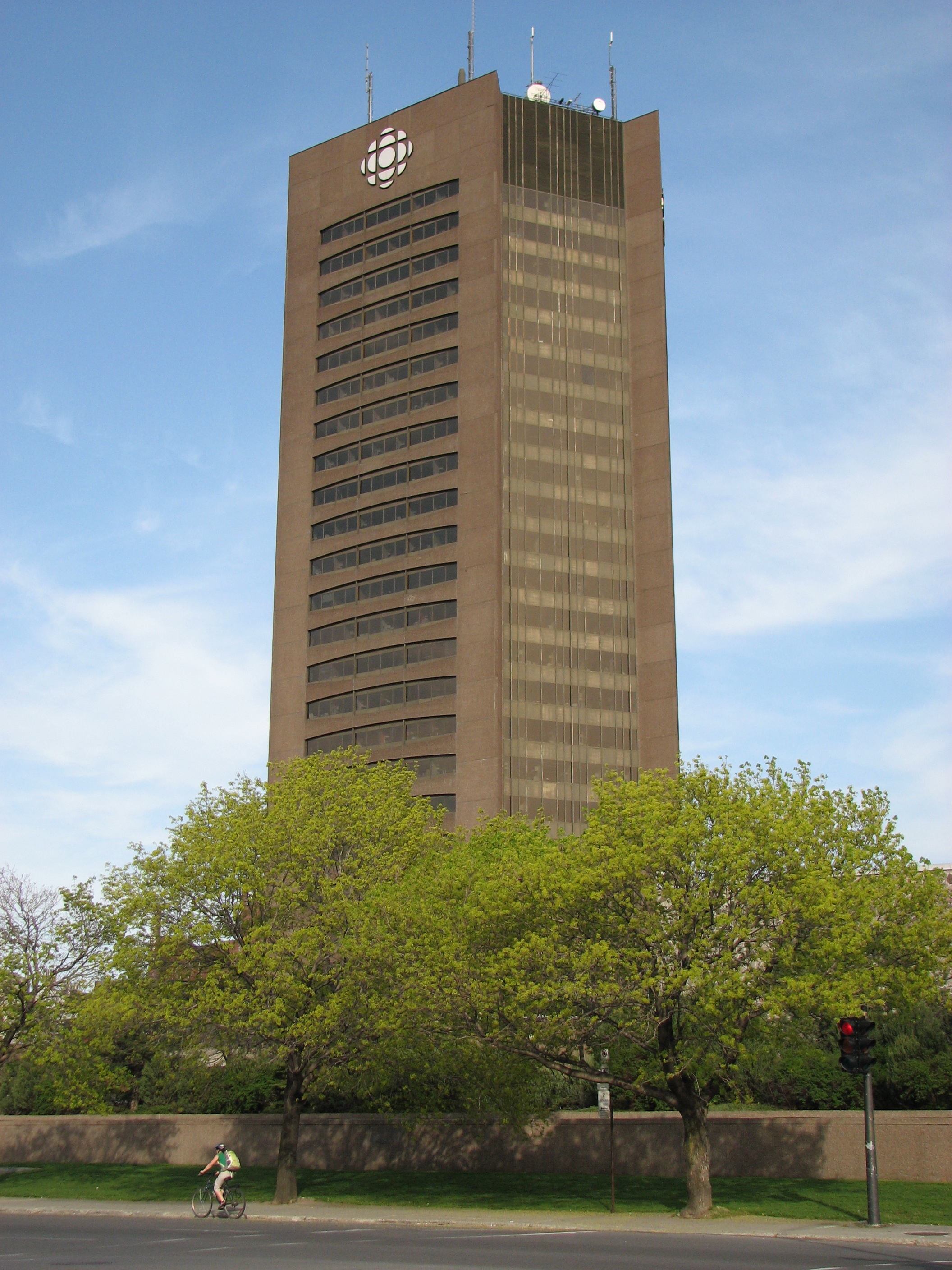
- Former Building, still has the CBC logo today
- Interactive map of the Maison de Radio-Canada area

General information
- Status: Currently in demolition (Former building)
- Type: Office
- Location: Current: 1000 Papineau Avenue; Montreal, Quebec; H2K 0C2 Former: 1400 René-Lévesque Boulevard east Montreal, Quebec; H2L 2M2, Canada
- Construction started: 1971
- Completed: 1973
- Renovated: 2020
- Demolished: 2025-present

Height
- Height: 105 metres (344 ft)

Technical details
- Floor count: 24

Design and construction
- Architecture firm: Tore Björnstad

Other information
- Public transit: Beaudry

Maison de Radio-Canada (French pronunciation: [mɛzɔ̃ də ʁadjo kanada]; English: CBC House), located in Montreal, Quebec, Canada, was the broadcast headquarters, studios and master control for all French-language radio and television services of the Canadian Broadcasting Corporation (known in French as Société Radio-Canada/SRC) including its flagship station CBFT-DT. It is also the main studio for Montreal's local English-language CBC services (CBMT-DT, CBME-FM, and CBM-FM) and the headquarters of Radio Canada International, the CBC's digital international broadcasting service.

The street address of the old Maison de Radio-Canada is 1400 René Lévesque Boulevard East, named for former premier René Lévesque who was once a reporter and commentator for the CBC. The building is situated near the studios of CTV (CFCF-DT), Noovo (CFJP-DT), RDS, RDS Info, MétéoMédia, LCN, and TVA (CFTM-DT) which are at the intersection of Papineau Avenue. The new building, inaugurated in September 7, 2022, is located at 1000 Papineau Avenue.

The analogous facility for the CBC's English-language networks is the Canadian Broadcasting Centre in Toronto. The CBC's corporate headquarters for both languages are in Ottawa at the CBC Ottawa Broadcast Centre.

== Geography ==
The building is accessible within walking distance east of Beaudry station of the Montreal Metro.

For the building itself to be built, most of the Faubourg à m'lasse working-class neighbourhood had to be demolished. On October 1, 1963, the last house was evacuated so the demolition project could go ahead to clear land for the facility.

== Redevelopment ==
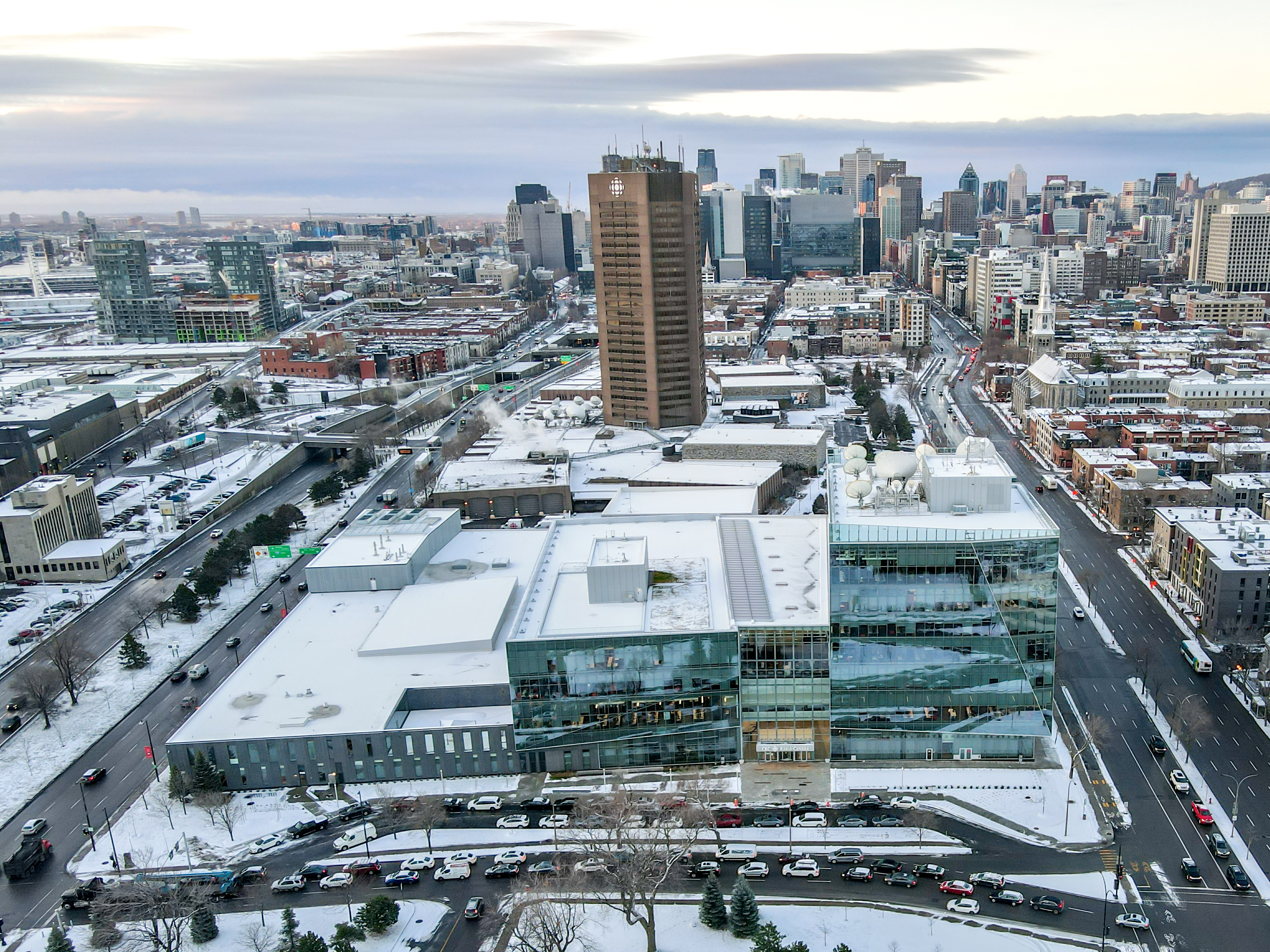
The two buildings of the House in 2020

As of November 2008, consultations are underway to redevelop the area around Maison de Radio-Canada. The new plans for the eastern part of the present site includes 2000 housing units, offices, commercial space, and public spaces at 1450 René Lévesque Boulevard East, which will cover about three city blocks. Furthermore, the new development would relink the street grid through the site, following the 1960s razing of a working-class neighbourhood popularly known as Faubourg à m'lasse to make way for the Radio-Canada complex.

As of May 2015, the project was halted. The project was relaunched in November 2016, with Broccolini Group selected to construct the new building and Groupe Mach chosen to take over the existing building and reconvert it to new uses. The project finally reached completion in 2020.

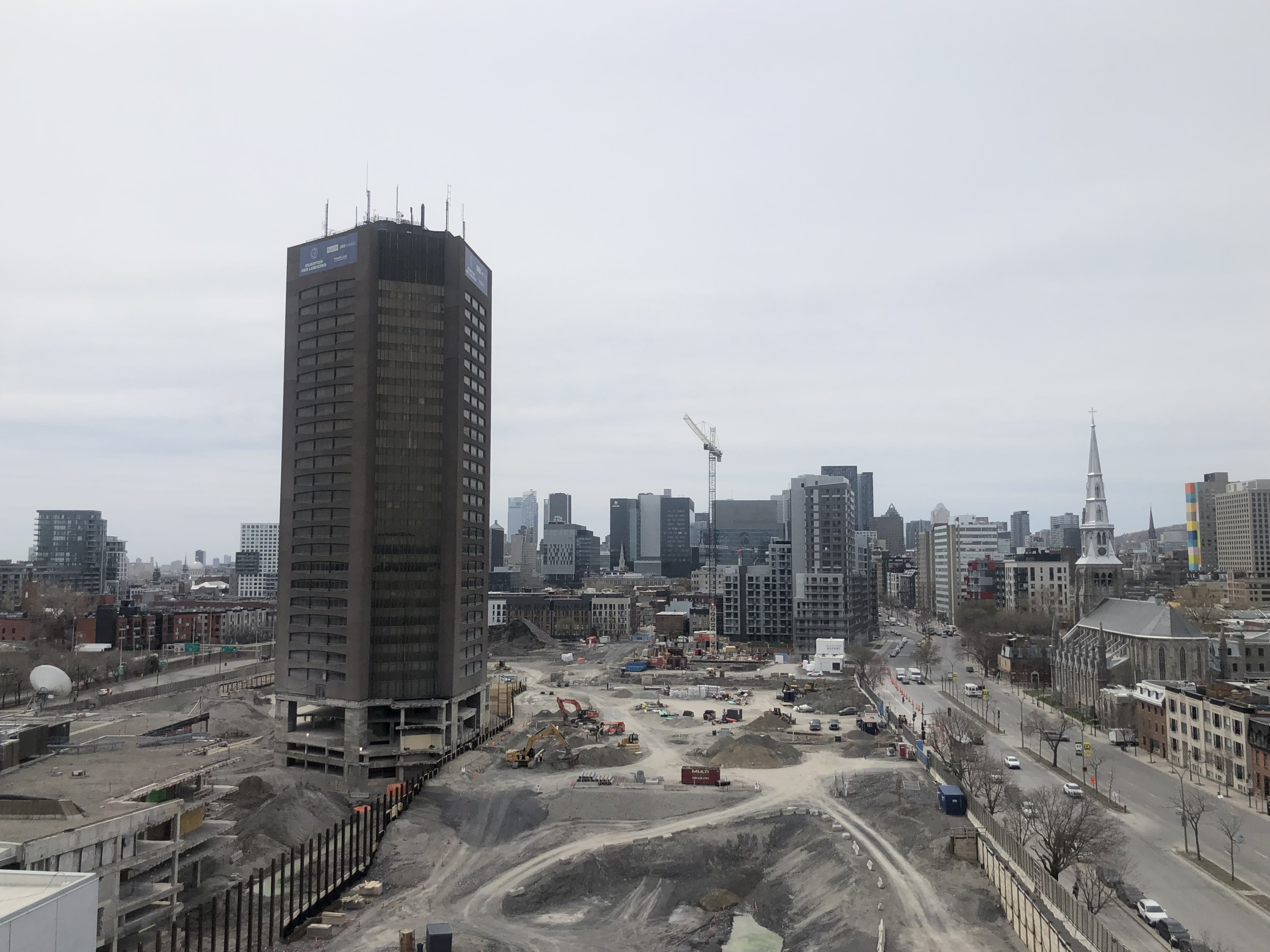
The old Maison de Radio-Canada in demolition, April 2026

The new building was inaugurated on September 7, 2022. The transfer of employees to the new Maison de Radio-Canada was gradual; the last to move were the newsroom staff and the English-language branch of the corporation, CBC. As of April 2025, most buildings of the old Maison de Radio-Canada were demolished to take place for a future residential project.
