= Club Super Sexe =

Former strip club in Montreal, Quebec

- Interactive map of Club Super Sexe
- Address: 696 Sainte-Catherine Street West; Montreal; Canada
- Coordinates: 45.5037°N 73.5692°W
- Type: Strip club

Construction
- Opened: 1978
- Closed: 2017

Club Super Sexe, commonly known as Super Sexe, was a strip club in downtown Montreal, Quebec, Canada. Located at 696 Sainte-Catherine Street West, the club operated from 1978 to 2017 and became one of the best-known adult entertainment venues in Montreal.

The establishment became especially known for its large rooftop neon sign showing stylized women in red capes suspended above Sainte-Catherine Street. The sign later became associated with Montreal nightlife and the city's former reputation as a permissive "sin city".

== History ==
Club Super Sexe opened in 1978 during a period when Montreal was widely associated with nightlife, strip clubs, discos, and adult entertainment.

The club operated on Sainte-Catherine Street West in the downtown core near other nightlife and entertainment venues. During the 1980s and 1990s, it became one of the most recognizable strip clubs in the city.

Its rooftop neon sign became a familiar feature of the downtown skyline. The illuminated display was visible from several blocks away and remained one of the best-known signs in Montreal nightlife.

By the 2000s, the venue was often referenced in articles and retrospectives dealing with Montreal's nightlife history and the decline of the city's historic red-light district culture.

== Closure and fire ==
Club Super Sexe closed in January 2017 after nearly 40 years of operation.

After the closure, discussions took place regarding the future of the building and whether the neon sign should be preserved. Some commentators and nightlife historians argued that the sign had become part of Montreal cultural history.

In October 2021, a major fire damaged the abandoned building and destroyed the remaining sign structure.

== Legacy ==
Super Sexe has frequently been mentioned in retrospectives about Montreal nightlife and the city's former adult entertainment industry.

The club's sign became one of the more recognizable nightlife landmarks on Sainte-Catherine Street during the late 20th century.

Writers discussing Montreal's nightlife history have often cited Super Sexe as an example of the city's more permissive entertainment culture before the redevelopment and gentrification of much of downtown nightlife.

== See also ==
- Cinéma L'Amour
- Culture of Montreal
