= Seville Theatre =

Coordinates: 45°29′26″N 73°35′0″W

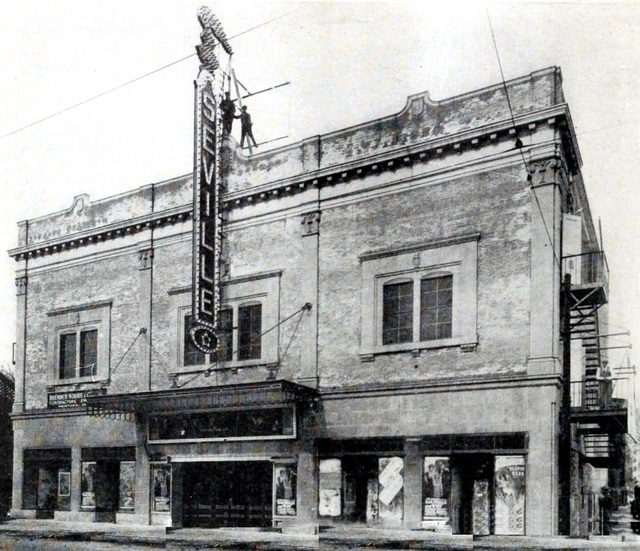
The Seville Theatre at opening in 1929

The Seville Theatre was a movie theatre on Sainte-Catherine Street West between Lambert-Closse and Chomedey streets in Montreal, Quebec, Canada, in a district now known as Shaughnessy Village. After closing in 1985 the theatre was shuttered and remained abandoned for 25 years. It was demolished October 2010.

== Original design ==
The theatre, designed by Cajetan L. Dufort (full name Louis-Joseph Cajetan Dufort, also the architect of the Corona Theatre), was built in 1929 – just five years after the nearby Montreal Forum – in a then-bustling part of downtown Montreal. Its interior was designed by Emmanuel Briffa.

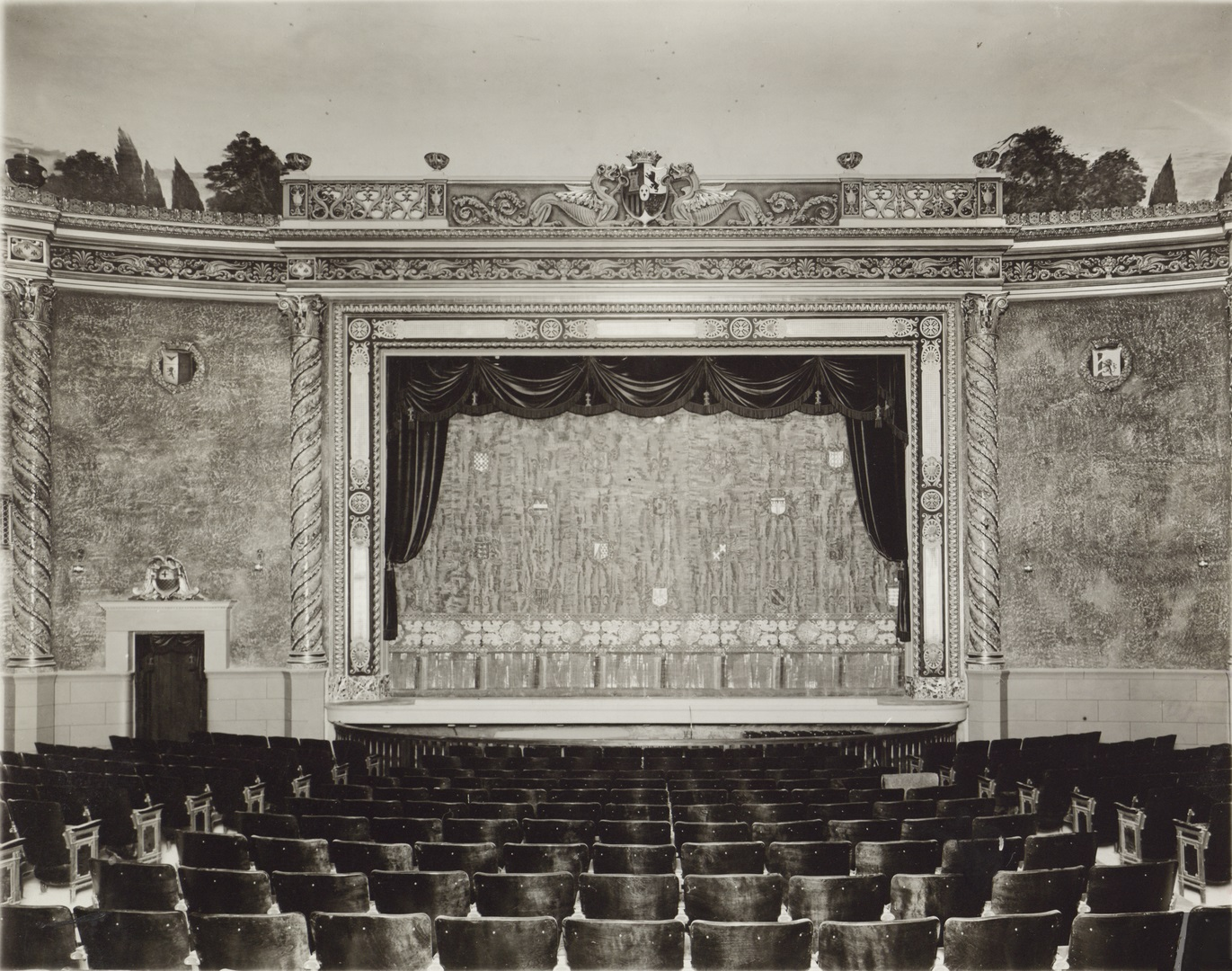

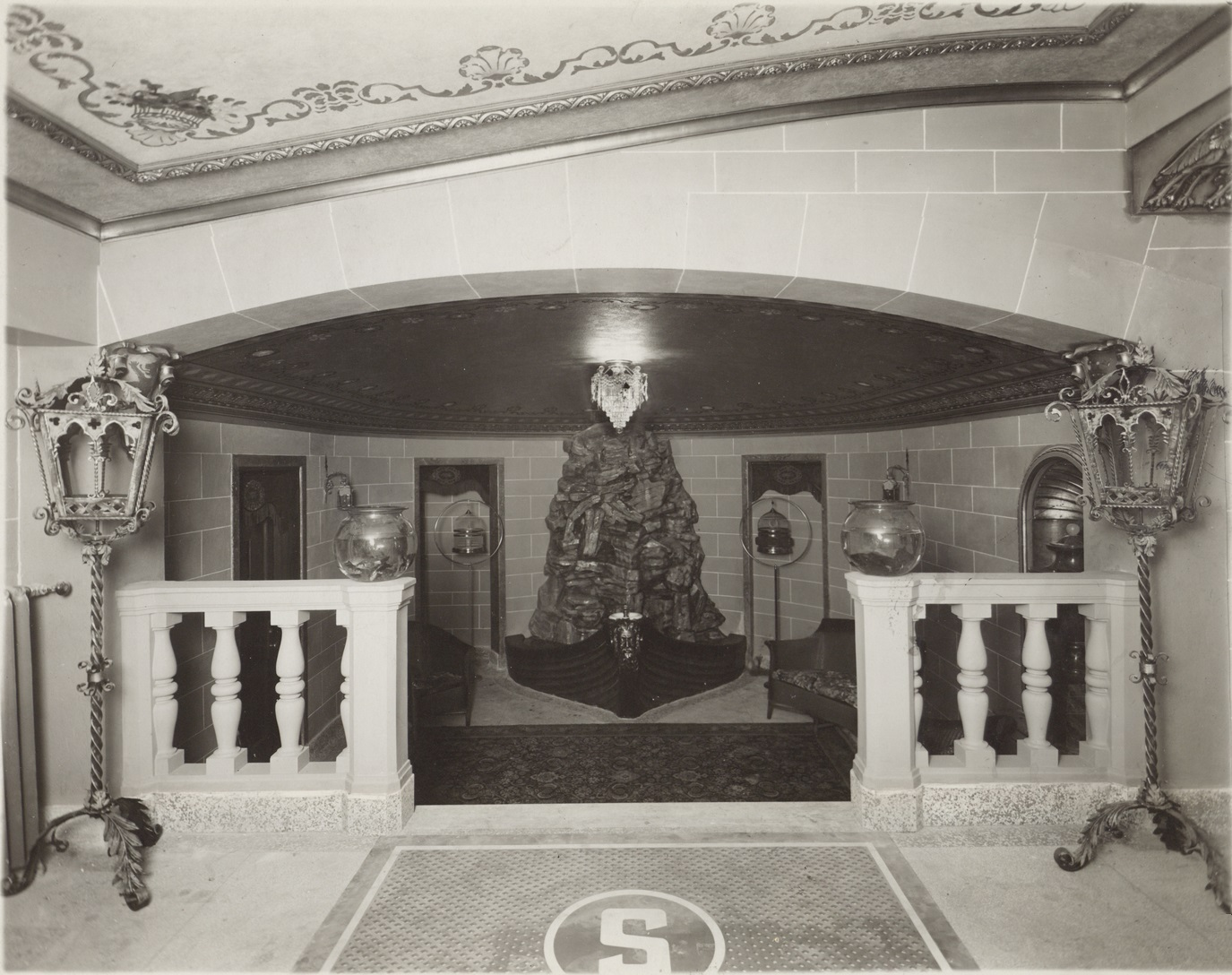

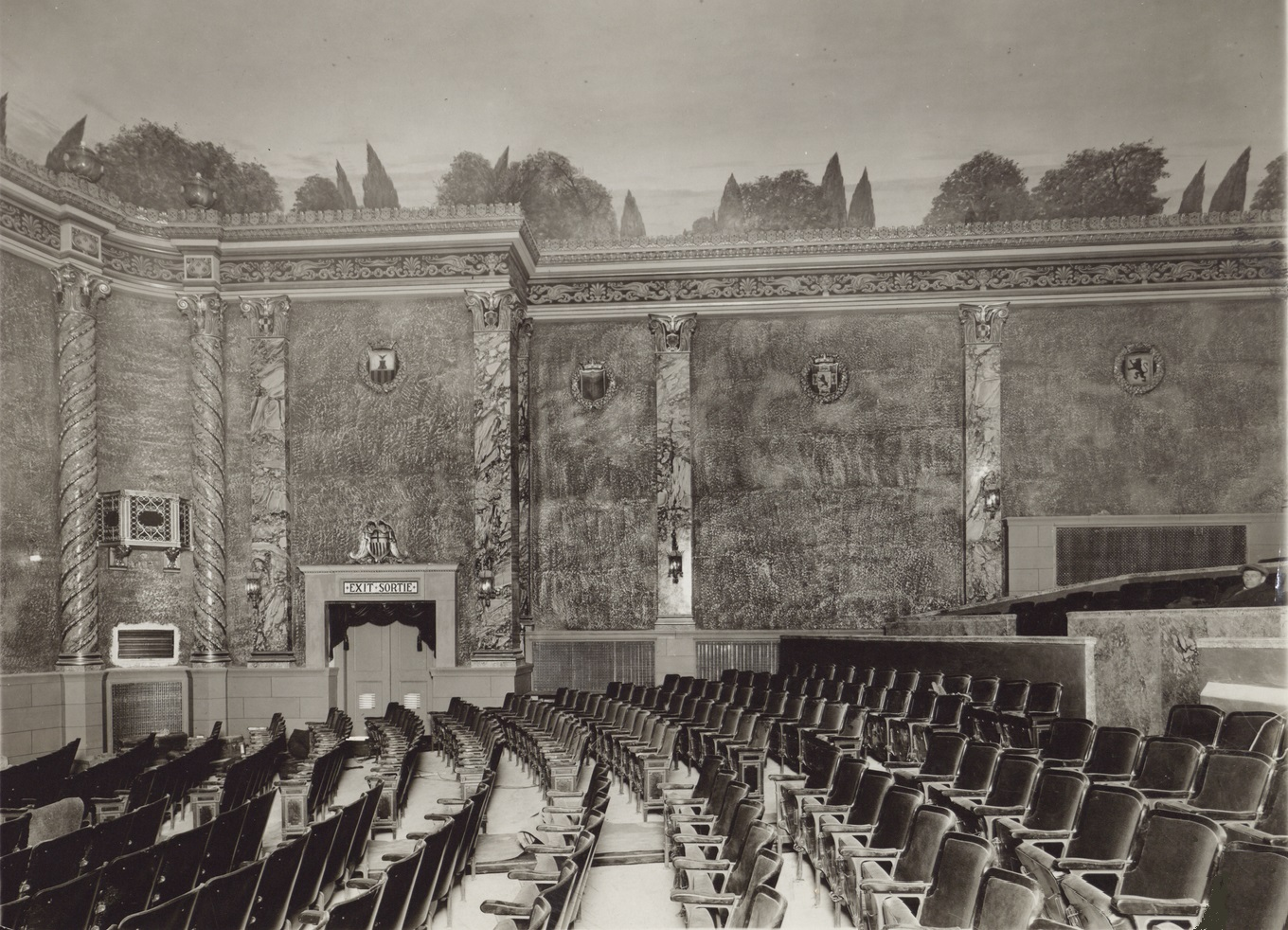

The Seville was a single-screen, 1148-seat theatre and one of only 15 atmospheric theatres ever built in Canada. Its interior had a Spanish theme (hence the name "Seville") with its ceiling painted to resemble a night sky with sparkling stars. There was an additional mechanism in place that could be turned on to give the appearance of clouds moving across the sky. The theatre was built with shops in the front, including an ice cream parlour on the east side and a drugstore on the west.

In the 1940s the theatre became a live theatre, hosting a variety of performers including Nat King Cole, Tony Bennett, The Four Aces, Peggy Lee, Sammy Davis Jr., Frank Sinatra and Louis Armstrong.

== Redesign ==
The Seville's interior was redesigned about 1950 by Oscar Glas using a pastel colour theme, and most of the original decorations were either discarded or sent to the monastery of St-Bernard-de-Lacolle.

In the 1960s, the Seville reverted to showing movies once again. The Seville was home to The Sound of Music for a two-year run between 1965 and 1967. Then in 1978 the Seville was converted into a repertory theatre. After the theatre's owners claimed their rent was quadrupled in 1985, the theatre ceased operation. The last film to be shown was Stop Making Sense on October 31, 1985.

== Abandonment ==
The structure declined rapidly. A series of developers showed interest in the site, but it is rumoured that the 1987 filming of Street Smart, starring Christopher Reeve was the beginning of the end of the Seville. During filming the production crew cut a hole in the Seville's screen in order to gain faster access to the dressing rooms located under the stage. The screen, which was one of the largest in the city at the time, was no longer viable for movie projection and since the screen would need to be replaced, the Seville was no longer viable as a repertory theatre.

In 1990, the building was declared an historic site by the city, protecting the exterior of the structure, but not the interior. Despite this, in 1994 a large chunk of the east wall collapsed onto the sidewalk, leaving a gaping hole in the side of the building. The hole contributed to the further deterioration of the Seville's interior.

In 1997, local heritage activist Phyllis Lambert wrote a letter to the Montreal Gazette advocating for the theatre to be preserved and restored into a live venue. But in 1998, the interior of the building was gutted to make room for a two-story retail and office building. Despite a great deal of fanfare, including the presence of then-mayor Pierre Bourque at the announcement, plans for this redevelopment fell through.

== Demolition and redevelopment ==
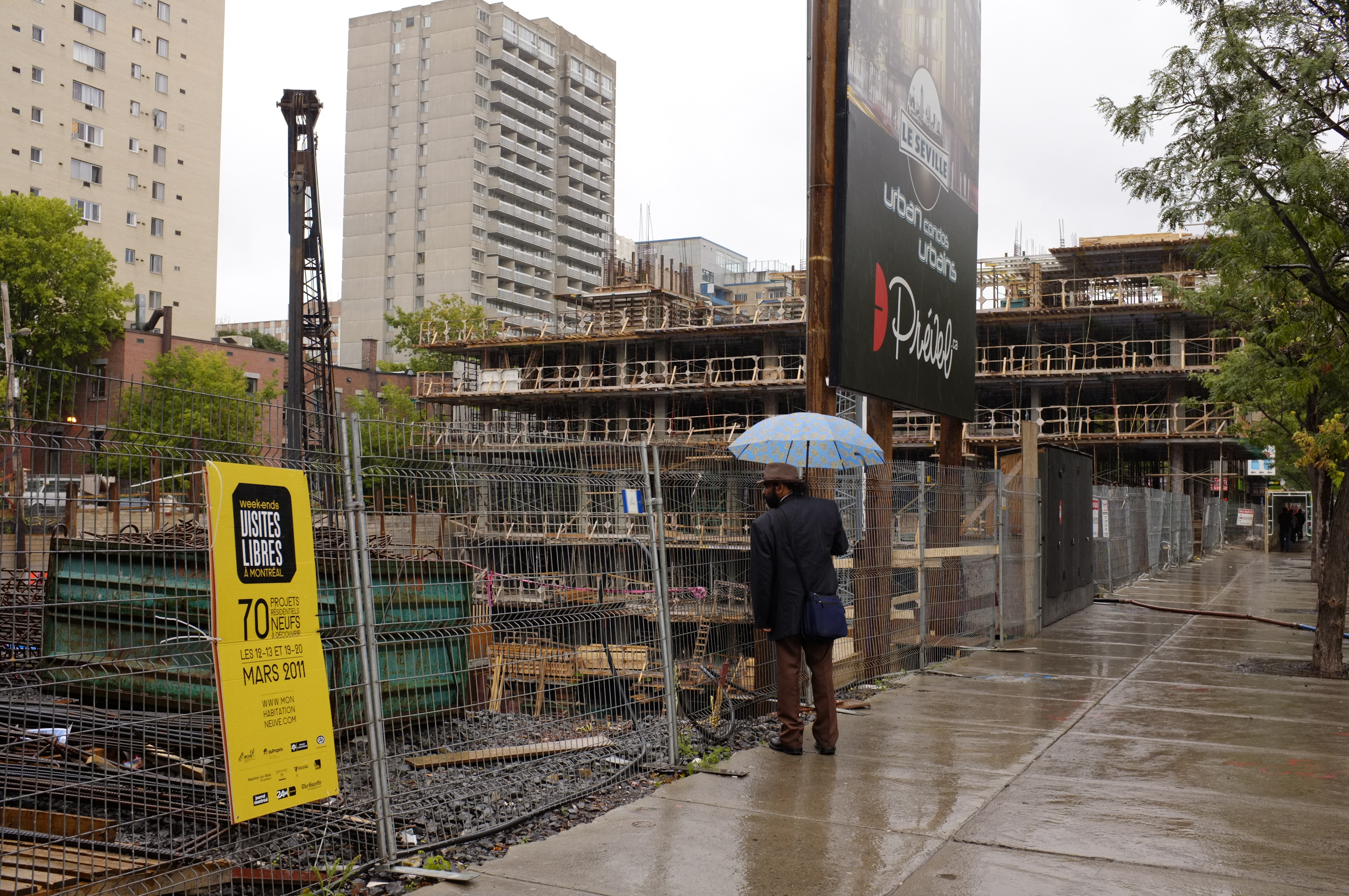
Le Seville condo project under construction, September 2011.

The theatre's facade remained, albeit in poor shape, with hopes to fulfill requirements of its heritage designation. But no developer came through. The Seville's overall story is one of "demolition by neglect"; the building was not maintained over the years to the point where its most significant features no longer existed and preservation of the Seville's interior was an impossibility.

It was to have been part of an "eco-friendly residential and commercial development," but the project never materialized. In February 2009, it was announced complete demolition of the remains of the Seville will proceed, in order for redevelopment of the site as part of a $100-million real-estate project by Claridge Properties. However, the project did not move forward. In April 2010, following yet another intervention by Lambert, Claridge again promised that the project would proceed.

The Seville and surrounding structures were demolished in the summer/fall of 2010 to make way for a 450-unit condo and commercial project called Le Seville. Construction of phases 1 and 2 has begun, with plans for construction to begin on phases 3a and b in 2012.
