= York Theatre (disambiguation) =

York Theatre is an off-Broadway theatre company based in New York City.

York Theatre may also refer to:

- York Theatre (Montreal) (1938–2001), a cinema and mixed-use complex in Montreal, Canada
- York Theatre, Adelaide (1921–1960s), a former cinema in Adelaide, South Australia
- York Theatre, Sydney, a theatre within the Seymour Centre, part of the University of Sydney, New South Wales, Australia
- York Theatre Royal, a theatre in York, England, UK, dating from 1744
