= Beanfield Theatre =

Theatre in Montreal, Canada

Coordinates: 45.4829°N 73.5751°W

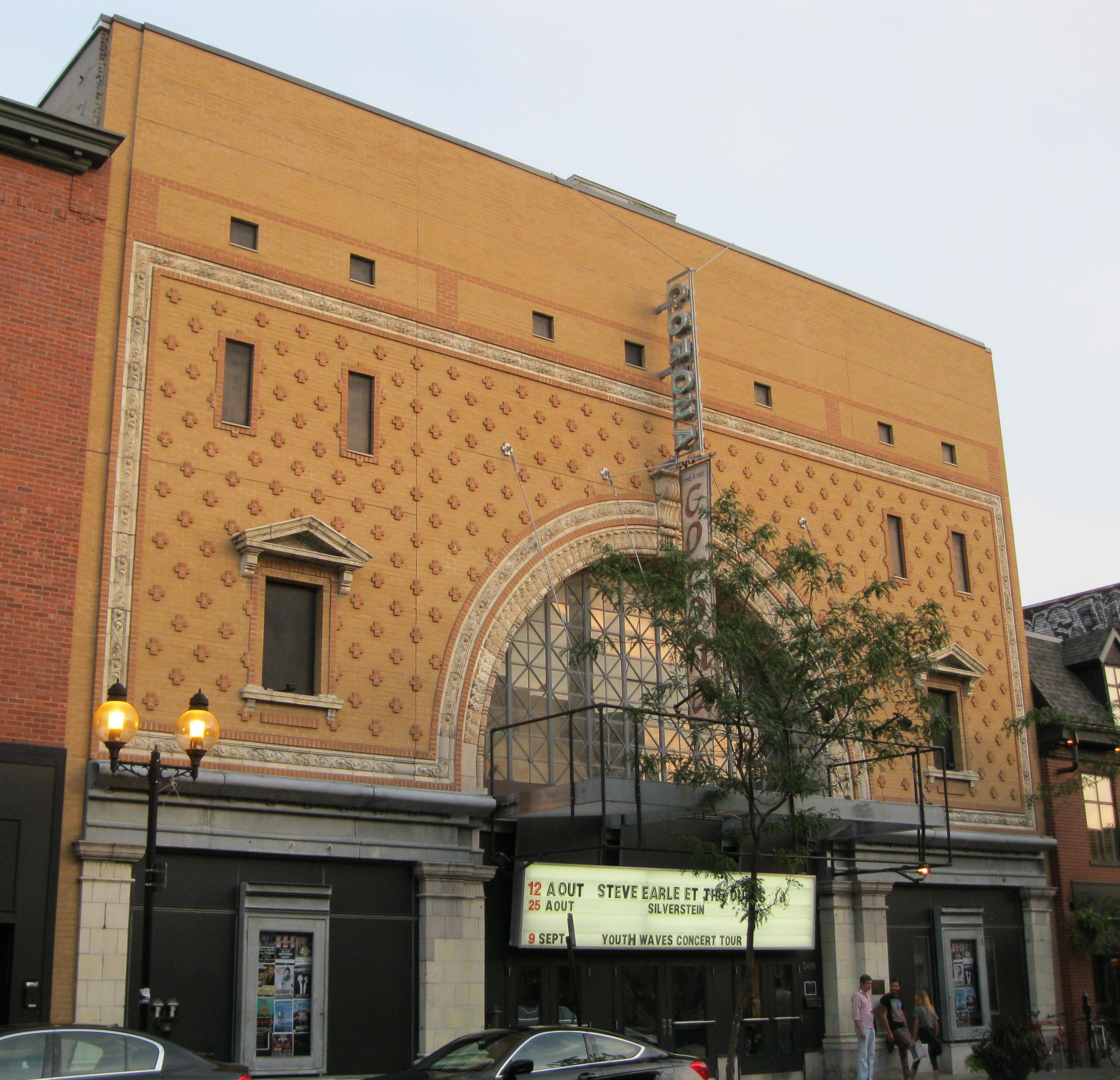
The Beanfield Theatre, located on Rue Notre-Dame Ouest in Montreal.

The Beanfield Theatre (French: Théâtre Beanfield) (previously known as Corona Theatre), in Montreal, Quebec, Canada is located at 2490 Rue Notre-Dame Ouest in the Little Burgundy neighbourhood of the borough of Le Sud-Ouest.

It is one of several vintage movie theatres in Montreal whose façade and interior have retained their original appearance. It is mostly used for musical performances and live events.

== History ==
The theatre was built in 1912 for silent film. Originally known as the Family Theatre, it was designed by architects Joseph-Cajetan Dufort and Louis-Joseph-Théophile Décary for the Duchess Amusement Company; which owned the theatre until 1923, when it was sold to the United Amusements Corporation. With the sale, the theatre acquired the name Théâtre Corona, and was modified by architect Daniel John Crighton and theatre decorator Emmanuel Briffa. The original glass and metal marquee were also replaced by a cast-iron design by Crighton in 1938.

It was acquired by the city of Montreal in 1967 and then rented to the Noiseux Plumbing Supply Co., which used the hall as storage. In the 1980s it was a filming location for films by André Forcier and Jean Beaudin. It was re-opened briefly in the summer of 1987 by Les Petites Filles aux Allumettes for performances of hybrid theatre and visual arts.

It was acquired by the nonprofit Institut des arts de la scène in October 1997 and was renovated and reopened in 1998. Its façade was restored in 2004. The interior of the theatre suffered C$50,000 of damage following an electrical fire in March 2007.

In December 2012, the theatre was acquired by Virgin Mobile in partnership with Evenko, and the latter is now the property manager. The name was then changed to Virgin Mobile Corona Theatre. The name reverted to Théâtre Corona a few years later.

In June 2023, the theatre assumed a new sponsor, internet service provider Beanfield, and the name was changed to Beanfield Theatre / Théâtre Beanfield.
