= KPMG Tower =

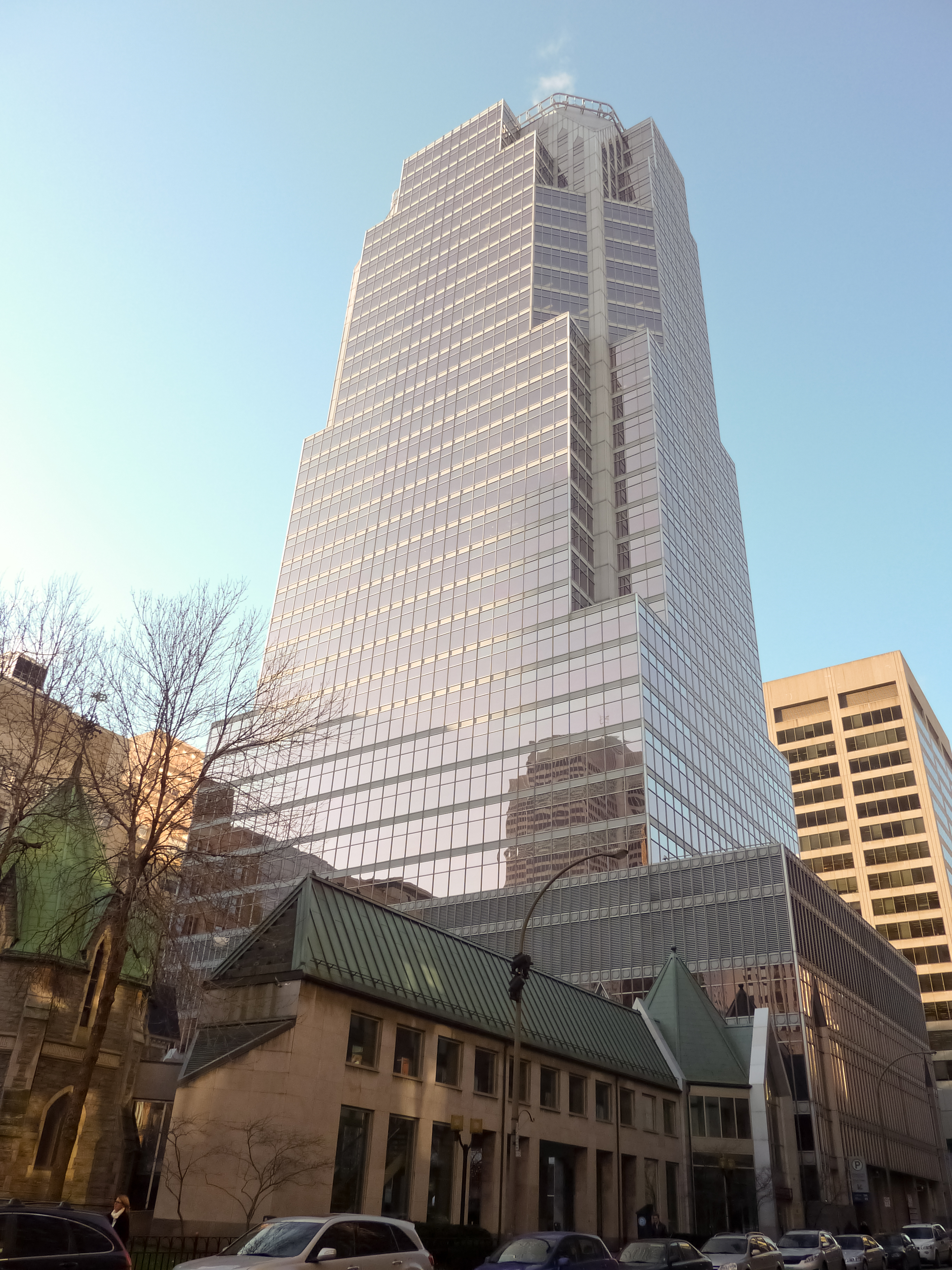

- Location within Montreal

General information
- Status: Completed
- Type: Office
- Architectural style: Postmodern
- Location: Montreal, Quebec Canada
- Coordinates: 45°30′15″N 73°34′15″W
- Completed: 1987
- Owner: BentallGreenOak

Height
- Roof: 146 m (479 ft)

Technical details
- Floor count: 34
- Lifts/elevators: Otis Elevator Company

Design and construction
- Architect: WZMH Architects

Website
- www.groupemach.com/en/property/172-kpmg-tower.html

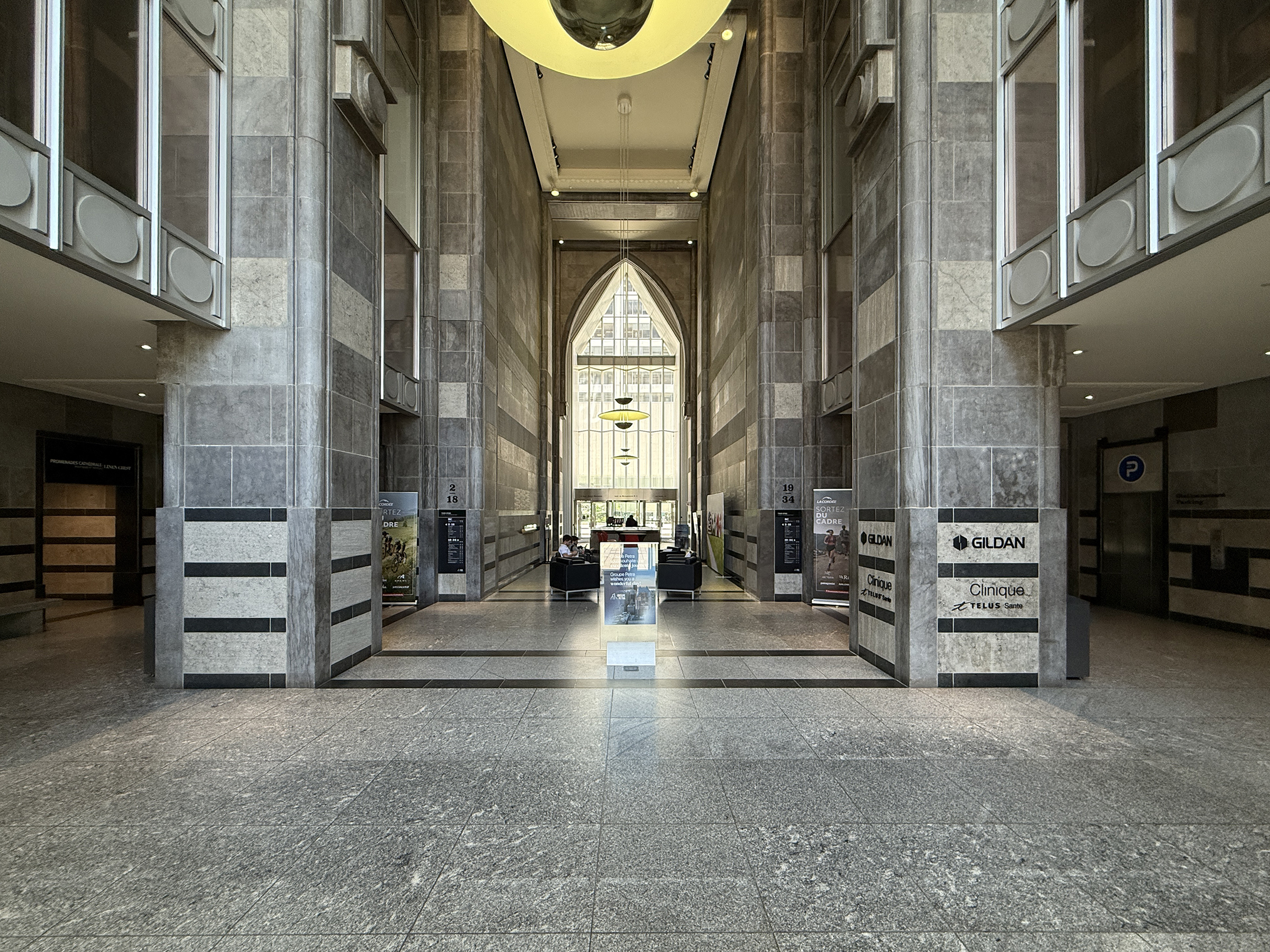
Office lobby

The KPMG Tower, formerly Maison des Coopérants or Place de la Cathédrale, is a 34-storey skyscraper in downtown Montreal, Canada, that was completed in 1987. It is at 600 de Maisonneuve Ouest and has an official height of 146 m (479 ft). The building is owned and operated by BentallGreenOak.

The KPMG Tower was built on a plot of land owned by the Christ Church Cathedral, which lies directly in front of the building when viewed from Saint Catherine Street. It was designed by WZMH Architects and was styled to relate to the cathedral.

The tower incorporates an underground shopping centre, Promenades Cathédrale, as part of the underground city that is connected to the Metro.

== Overview ==
The building was originally called Maison des Coopérants for the then-anchor tenant, as can be seen on the inscription in the lobby; however, it was later named Place de la Cathédrale. At the end of 2005 the tower was renamed to its current name for KPMG, the new anchor tenant that occupies floors 6 to 15 and part of the 17th.

Part of its local claim to fame was that the Promenades Cathédrale shopping mall underneath the tower, built at the same time, was built beneath the existing Christ Church Cathedral. It was a sight to behold, as the cathedral was perched on top of cement piles with the soil removed from under it, resulting in a cathedral that seemed to be floating in mid air. From time to time, the building administration runs an exhibit in the shopping mall displaying the construction of the complex. A consequence of this arrangement is that the cathedral no longer has its proverbial basement. The functions traditionally done in the church basement are now performed in a space reserved for the church on the third floor of the tower's east side.

At the time of its opening, the shopping mall had three floors with a food court occupying most of the lower floor. Later renovations converted that shopping floor into a second floor of parking garage.

A memorial to Raoul Wallenberg stands in a small park between the office tower and church, where a bust of Wallenberg and a caged metal box (styled as a barbed-wire gate) stand beside each other.

The building features prominently during the Temptation of Christ scene in the 1989 Denys Arcand film Jesus of Montreal, reflecting the tower's status as the most prominent and modern skyscraper built in Montreal during the late 1980s as well as its unique relationship with the church.

== Tenants ==
The building contains the private medical clinic TELUS Health, the headquarters of Gildan Activewear and holds offices for the professional services firm KPMG, Empire Life, and the offices of the Anglican Diocese of Montreal.

== See also ==
- Promenades Cathédrale shopping mall
- List of Montreal's 10 tallest skyscrapers
- List of malls in Montreal
