= Rialto Theatre (Montreal) =

Former movie palace in Quebec, Canada

Coordinates: 45°31′24″N 73°36′18″W

- French: Théâtre Rialto
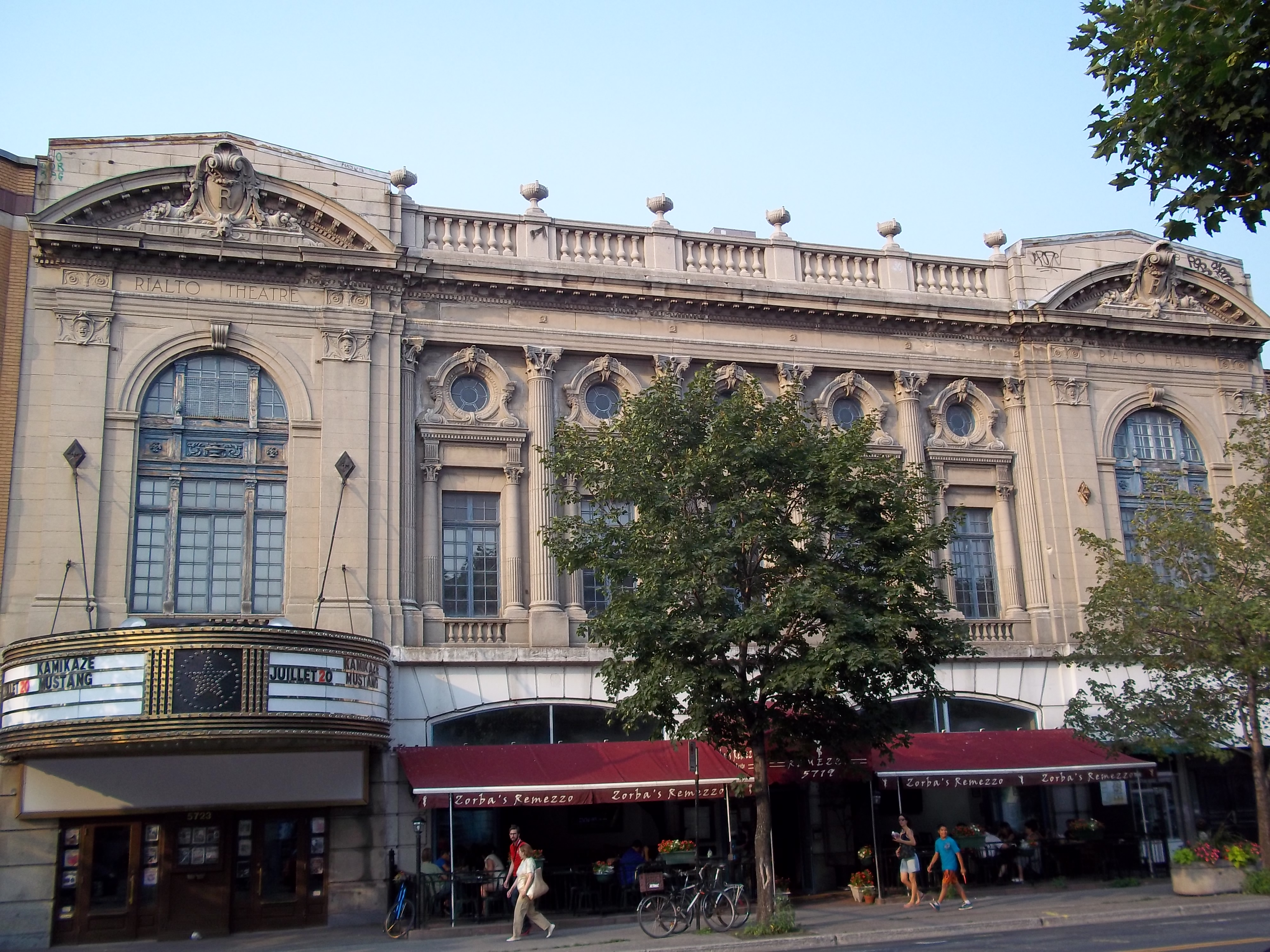
- The Rialto Theatre
- Interactive map of the Rialto Theatre area

General information
- Location: 5723, avenue du Parc; Montreal, Quebec, Canada; H2V 4G9
- Construction started: 1923
- Completed: 1924

Design and construction
- Architect: Joseph-Raoul Gariépy

Other information
- Seating capacity: 1,165

National Historic Site of Canada
- Official name: Rialto Theatre National Historic Site of Canada
- Designated: 1993

Patrimoine culturel du Québec
- Type: Historic monument
- Designated: 1988 (municipal), 1990 (provincial)

The Rialto Theatre (French: Théâtre Rialto) is a former movie palace located on Park Avenue in Montreal, Quebec, Canada. It is designated as a National Historic Site of Canada.

Built in 1923-1924 and designed by Montreal architect Joseph-Raoul Gariépy, who specialized in theatre and hospital projects, the Rialto was inspired by the Napoleon III style Paris Opera House. The interior was designed by Emmanuel Briffa, designer of over sixty Canadian movie houses, in the Louis XVI style. The Rialto operated as a cinema until the 1990s.

The Rialto Theatre has undergone many changes since 2000. All of the theatre seats were removed and attempts were even made to convert it into a steakhouse. After nearly thirty years of ownership, owner Elias Kalogeras was finally able to sell it in March 2010 to Le Groupe Merveilles Inc. and its owners Ezio Carosielli and Luisa Sassano. Since then, they have acted on their intention to protect the theatre and restore its unique architecture.
