= Cinéma L'Amour =

Adult cinema in Montreal, Canada

Coordinates: 45°31′0.84″N 73°34′45.48″W

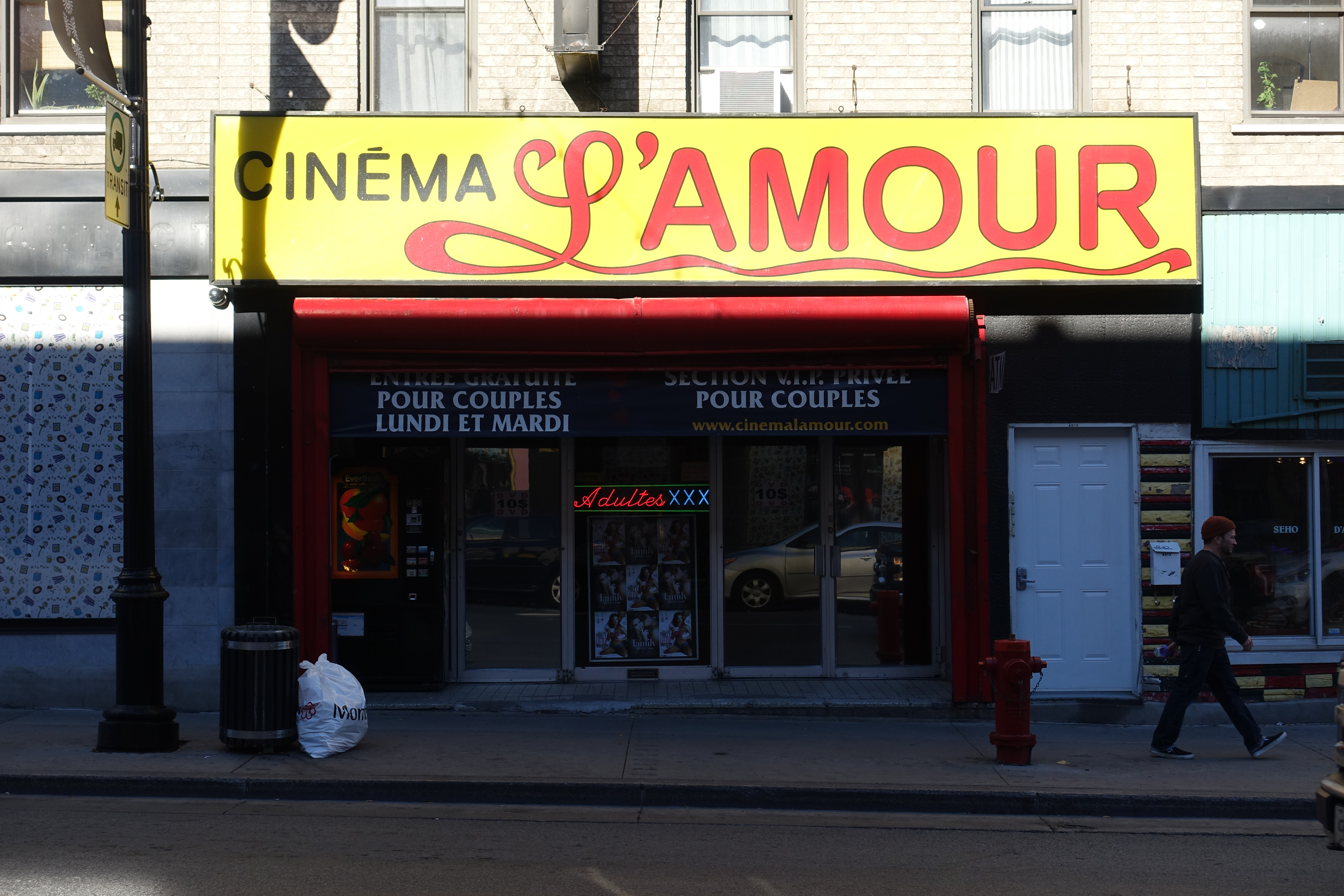
View of the entrance of Cinema L'Amour.

The Cinéma L'Amour is an adult movie theatre on Saint Laurent Boulevard in the Plateau-Mont-Royal, Montreal, Canada.

== About ==
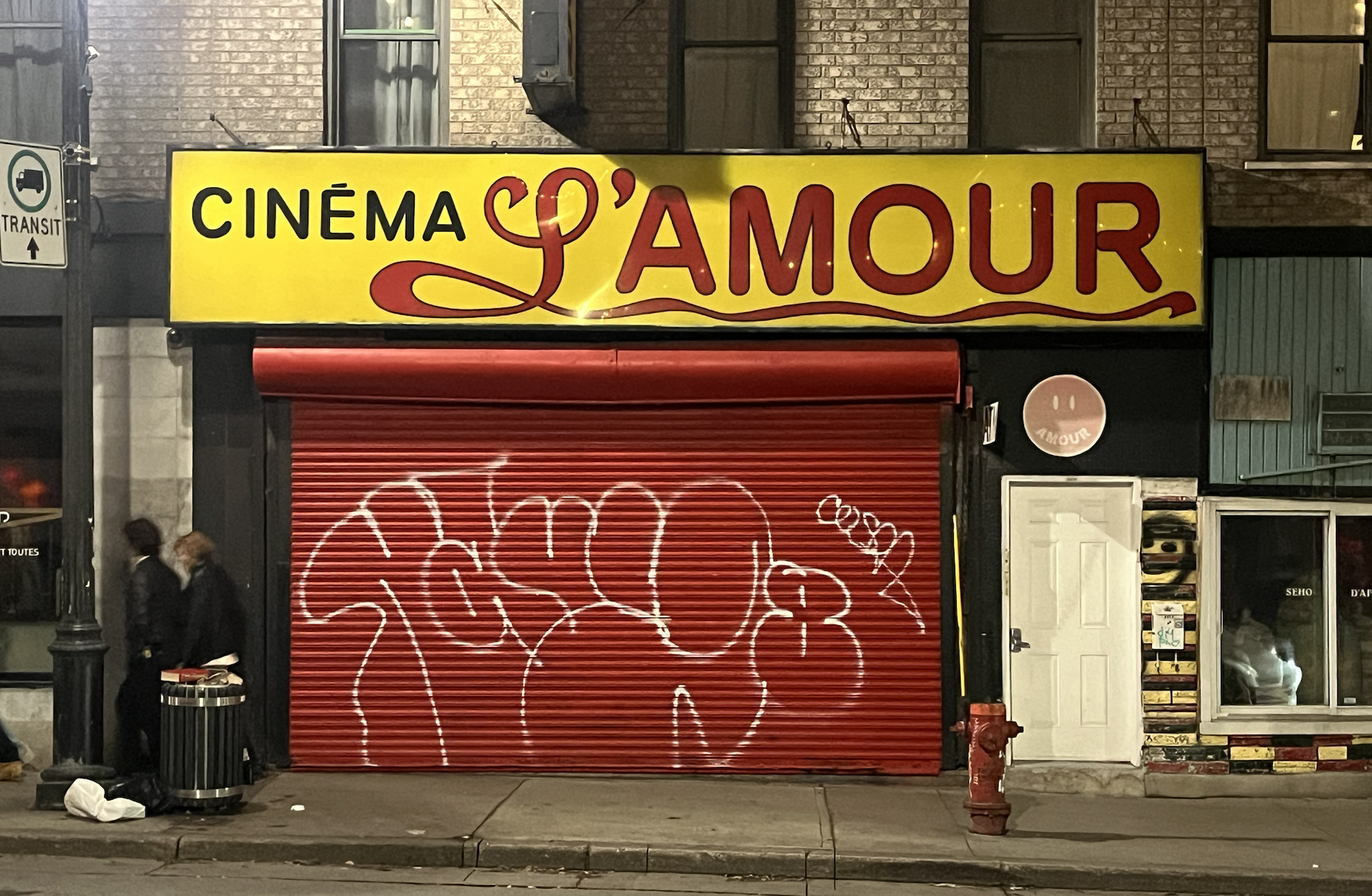
The entrance of the theatre while closed illuminated by their vibrant yellow and red sign.

The Cinéma L'Amour is one of North America's last adult movie theatres. It is a family-owned business located on Saint-Laurent Blvd, in Montreal, Quebec. The theatre opened in 1914 and was known as "Le Globe," presumed to be named after The Globe theatres in London, and was focused on showing Yiddish films in the 20s and 30s. In 1932, the theatre was changed to "The Hollywood" and maintained its reputation as an internationally renowned theatre/movie house. It started featuring strictly explicit, adult-themed movies in 1969 under the name "The Pussycat." On July 31, 1981, the theatre was purchased by Ivan Koltai, a businessman who intended to create a franchise of adult movie theatres. It then landed on its final name, "Cinéma L'Amour," matching Koltai's then-existing theatre in Hull, Quebec, focusing exclusively on adult films.

Contributing to Montreal's cultural scene, Cinéma L'Amour has hosted music festivals, concerts, fashion shows, and movie shootings. Cinéma L'Amour also sells original vintage posters, stickers, and other merchandise that have increased in popularity in 2022 and onwards.

== History ==
Cinéma L’Amour was originally opened in 1914 under the name “Le Globe.” It served as an independent movie theatre at the heart of Montreal’s Jewish neighbourhood and played Yiddish films throughout the 1920s and 30s. It changed its name to “The Hollywood” in 1932 but remained a traditional cinema and opera house until 1969. In the year 1969 it changed its name to “The Pussycat” and became an known as an erotic cinema.

In 1981, Ivan Koltai was in the business of distributing hardcore 35mm porn films. The owner of the Pussycat would play only about one in five of his offerings. This encouraged Koltai to buy the building and wait for the theatre’s lease to lapse. After it did, it was swiftly re-opened as the Cinéma L’Amour, matching the name of a theatre the family already owned in Hull (now Gatineau), Quebec, which has since closed.

The story of Cinéma L’Amour began in Hull, Quebec. Owner Steve Koltai, who inherited the business from his father, chose this location because Quebec’s lax censorship laws made it the only province that could play hardcore porn films for audiences. Politicians and diplomats from Canada's capital of Ottawa were noted travelling to Hull to view films banned just over the river in Ontario.

The building celebrated its 100th anniversary in 2014.

== Building design ==
The building and interior design have remained nearly unchanged since its original construction as Le Globe. Le Globe was constructed in the Beaux-Arts architectural style, which originated in Paris and became widely influential during the second half of the 19th century. Drawing inspiration from the Italian Renaissance, this style aimed to confer a sense of grandeur to public buildings. Le Globe embodied all the key characteristics of Beaux-Arts design, including a flat roof, symmetrical layout, and the integration of sculptural elements. It also featured Classical details such as balustrades, pilasters, carved garlands, and bas-relief panels. The building was designed to host both live performances and film projections.

The lobby features vintage porn posters from the cinema’s archive, which contains posters of all movies that have been played since its inception. Many of these originals are available for purchase online at @lamour.art.gallery. There are also tongue-in-cheek posters, one reading: “5 stars. You Won’t Cry. But Bring Tissues.”

The entrance of the theatre starts with a long, narrow hallway. Inside is a large performance hall, decorated by the artist of the moment, Emmanuel Briffa (who left his mark on the Rialto and the Beaubien), equipped with a horseshoe balcony and several baskets. When originally made, the theatre could seat around 900 people. The benches in the hall were the original benched from the balconies, with only slight repairs from 1985 due to wear. Certain design elements throughout the theatre include traces from the silent film era, which welcomed artists and musicians. This influence is evident in the screen, stage, backstage, and the dressing rooms located in the basement.

== Venue uses ==
In addition to pornographic films, its programming has sometimes included exploitation films. Devyn Koltai, the third generation to manage the cinema, is attempting to bring new life to the cinema. Devyn has begun hosting events using Cinéma L'Amour as the venue under the name “Cinéma Erotica,” the goal being to bring in more traditional audiences.

The cinema has been used for hosting events including music festivals and live performances. Cinéma L'Amour has been used as a music venue for POP Montreal. It has also been rented for music videos such as for Daddy by Charlotte Cardin.

=== LGBTQ+ involvement ===
The events held at Cinéma L'Amour include those for the LGBTQ+ community. As of October 2024, every Wednesday is dedicated to Trans Night, which welcomes the transgender and LGBTQ+ communities. The theatre has been publicly welcoming and inclusive of the LGBTQ+ community, sporadically running events for the entire community.

=== Select events ===
Events held at Cinema L'Amour
Event date	Event title
December 6, 2021	Cinéma L'Amour Presents: An Abel Ferrara Double Feature / Deux Films D'Abel Ferrara
November 4, 2021	Cinéma L'Amour X Hamptons Gallery
October 31, 2021	Projection Speciale D’Halloween: Benedetta au Cinéma L'Amour
October 28, 2021	ALISS au Cinéma L'Amour
March 30, 2019	Voyeurs, Exhibitionnistes, & Echangistes!
September 28, 2018	Leif Vollebekk / Alexia Avina a Cinéma L'Amour
September 27, 2018	Socalled Porn POP: Premier of the Hourseitter
September 26, 2018	Sadenight | Lydia Kepinski au Cinéma L'Amour
August 12, 2017	John Cameron Mitchell at Cinéma L'Amour, Shortbus Screening

== Services and merchandise ==
Cinéma L'Amour makes a profit off of the large variety of merchandise that they sell behind the counter and from their website online. In the theatre, typical movie snacks are for sale during opening hours. Various pornographic DVDs are also physically sold at their location. The posters on the lobby walls and hallways are also sometimes for sale, including original vintage posters popular for room decoration and the theatre’s posters with their logo.

== Clientele ==
Cinéma L'Amour’s clientele varies from 18-year-olds to customers as old as 90. There are frequently couples who make use of the “couples only” section on the mezzanine. Robert Casini, the manager of the location, says there are up to 75 customers per day during the week and about 150 during the weekend. Steve Koltai states that the stereotypes of people who come to the theatre are not usually the reality and are “very decent people.”
