= Promenades Cathédrale =

Shopping mall in Montreal, Canada

Coordinates: 45°30′14″N 73°34′13″W

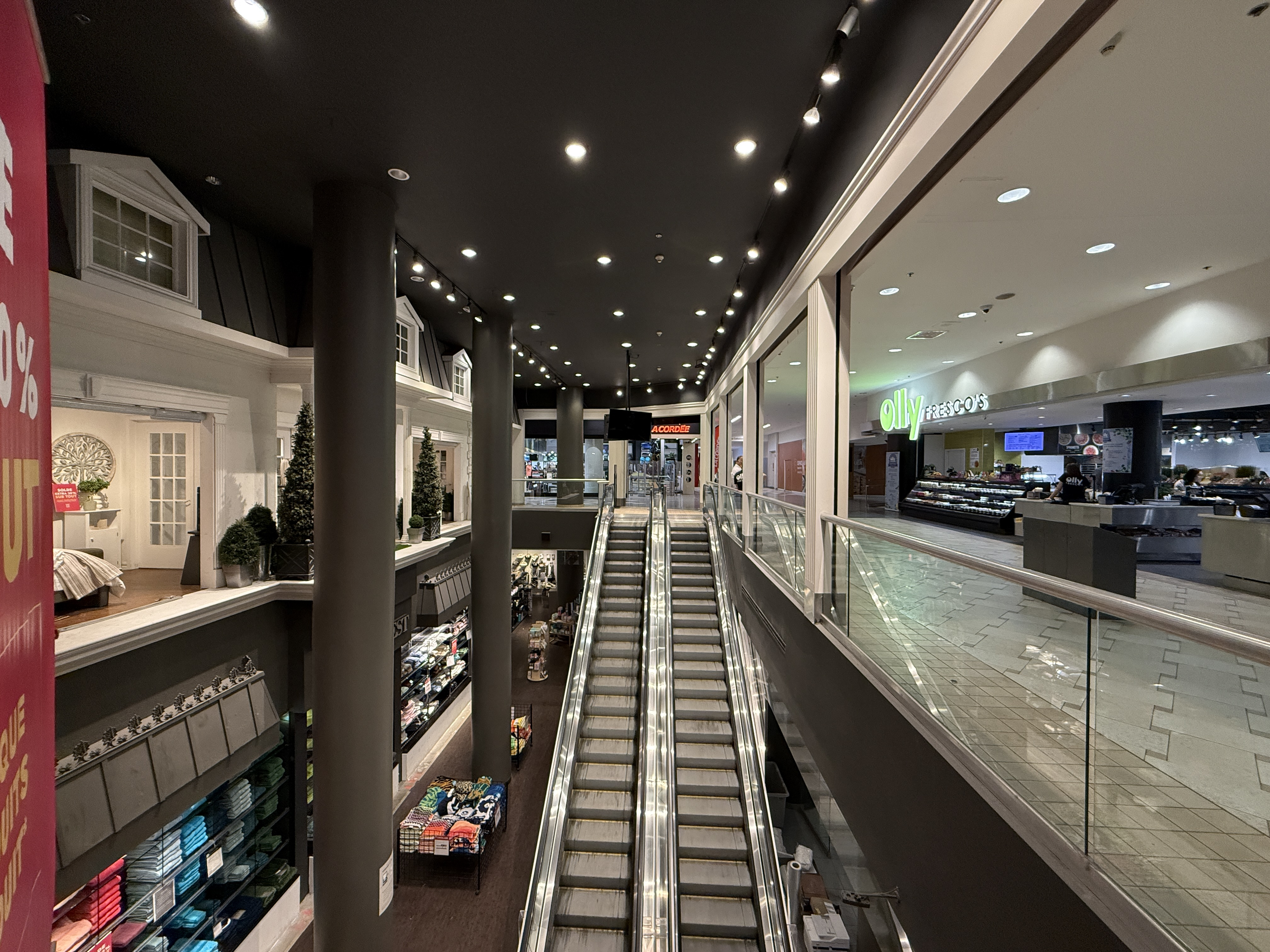
Interior of Promenades Cathédrale

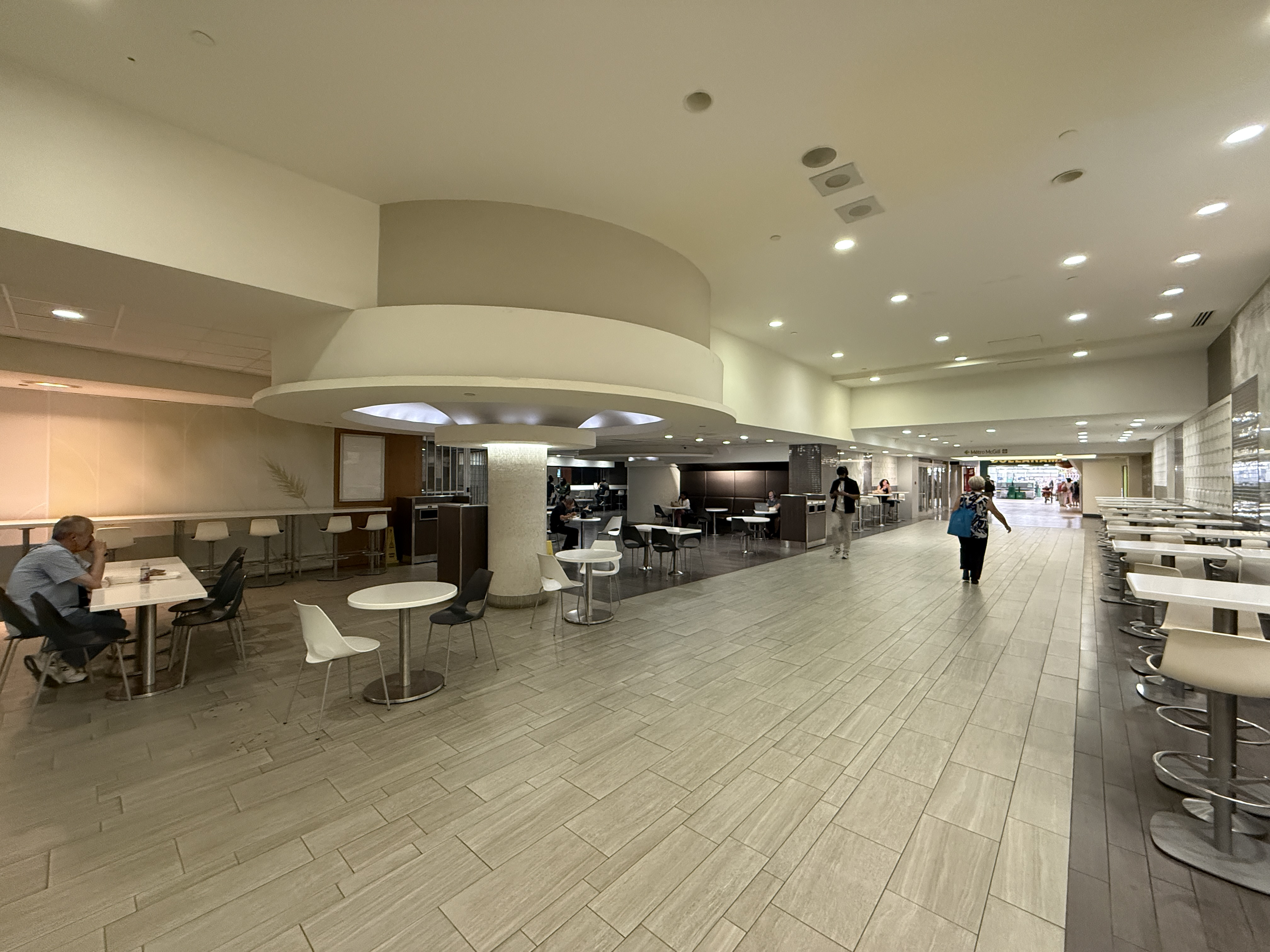
Food Court

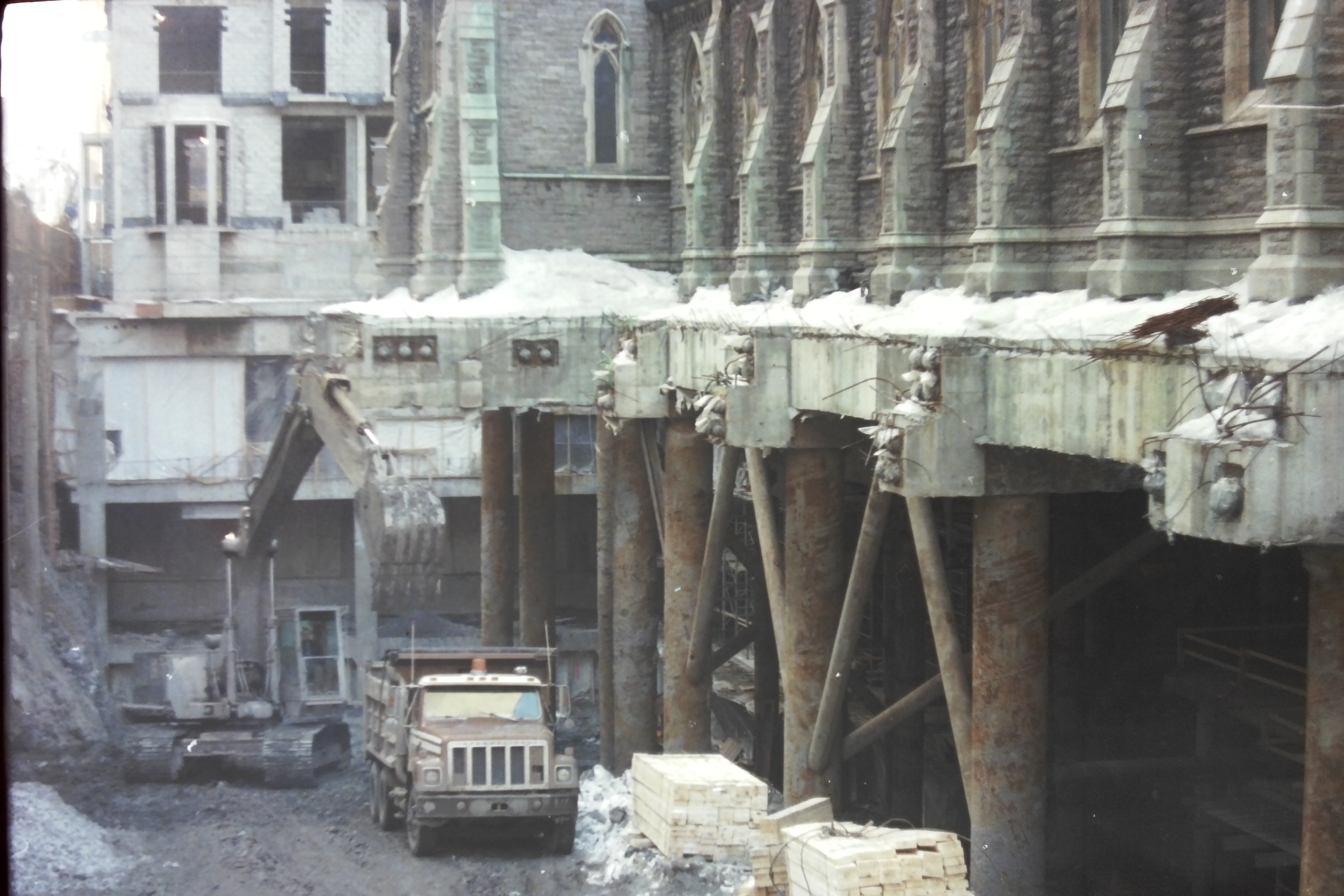
Excavation of Promenades Cathédrale in March, 1988

Promenades Cathédrale is a 135,495-square-foot (12,587.9 m^{2}) retail complex on Saint Catherine Street in downtown Montreal, Quebec, Canada.

The complex is located beneath Montreal's Anglican Christ Church Cathedral. Constructed in 1987-88, the mall is integrated into the underground city.

The complex is connected to Henry Morgan Building across the street along Avenue Union and was home to Hudson's Bay Company Montreal store.

== See also ==
- List of malls in Montreal
- Place de la Cathédrale office tower
