= Saint Catherine Street =

Street in downtown Montreal, Quebec

Coordinates: 45°30′36″N 73°33′49″W

Sainte-Catherine Street
- Sainte-Catherine Street, Downtown Montreal in 2026
- Interactive map of Sainte-Catherine Street
- Native name: rue Sainte-Catherine (French)
- Length: 11.2 km (7.0 mi)
- Location: Westmount and Montreal
- West end: De Maisonneuve Boulevard, Westmount
- Major junctions: R-112
- East end: Notre-Dame Street, Hochelaga-Maisonneuve

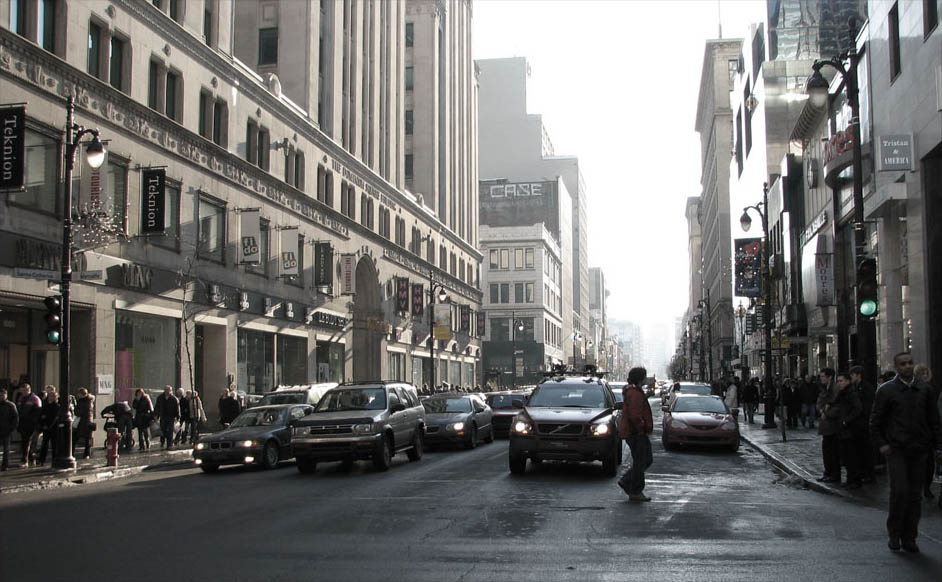
A general view of Sainte-Catherine Street

Sainte-Catherine Street (French: rue Sainte-Catherine [ʁy sɛ̃t katʁin]) (11.2 km or 7.0 mi) is the primary commercial artery of Downtown Montreal, Quebec, Canada. It crosses the central business district from west to east, beginning at the corner of Claremont Avenue and de Maisonneuve Boulevard in Westmount, and ending at the Grace Dart Extended Care Centre by Assomption metro station, where it folds back into Notre-Dame Street. It also traverses Ville-Marie, passing just east of Viau in Mercier–Hochelaga-Maisonneuve. The street is 11.2 km long, and considered the backbone of Downtown Montreal.

A series of interconnected office tower basements and shopping complexes line the street, parallel to the largest segments of Montreal's underground city. Educational institutions located on or near the street include Concordia University, McGill University, Université du Québec à Montréal, Dawson College and LaSalle College.

Nine metro stations serve as access to Sainte-Catherine Street, whereby it passes through residential neighbourhoods, the Quartier des spectacles and the downtown core. It also offers ease of access to the Underground Pedestrian Network.

== History ==
Sainte-Catherine Street has been a major landmark in Montreal for over a century. However, it is not known exactly when it was built as it was never part of a city plan. Instead, it just happened to be a highly frequented street. The street particularly began to grow after 1736.

At the end of the 19th century, English merchants set up shop along the western portion of the street. This led to a surge in department stores in Philips Square. Sainte-Catherine Street East held home to industry in the 1870s. Traditionally francophone, it became a commercial artery during this time. This is still seen today, with large stores, entertainment venues, cinemas and theatres continuing to attract commercial traffic.

It is not known exactly where the name 'Sainte-Catherine Street' originated, but there are three prevalent theories: The first theory, by Cléphas Saint-Aubin, states the name intends to honour Catherine de Bourbonnais (the suspected illegitimate child of King Louis XV). Another theory is that it was named after Catholic Saint Catherine of Alexandria. The final theory is that the street was named by Jacques Viger after one of his daughters-in-law, Catherine Elizabeth. In its early years, Sainte-Catherine was known as 'Sainte-Genevieve,' or 'Saint-Gabriel'. During this time, it was common for street names to change frequently.

Throughout the 18th century, Montreal had no municipal council. All administrative issues pertaining to roads were the responsibility of the Justices of the Peace. In the late 18th century, the Roads Act of 1796 allowed justices to approve or deny road construction and funding for roads. Further, landowners and farmers were pressured to pay for the construction of streets. Road inspectors, like Montreal's first mayor, Jacques Viger, were appointed; their responsibilities were to ensure roads like Sainte-Catherine Street were level, drained and aligned properly, and adequately paved.

== Construction and development ==
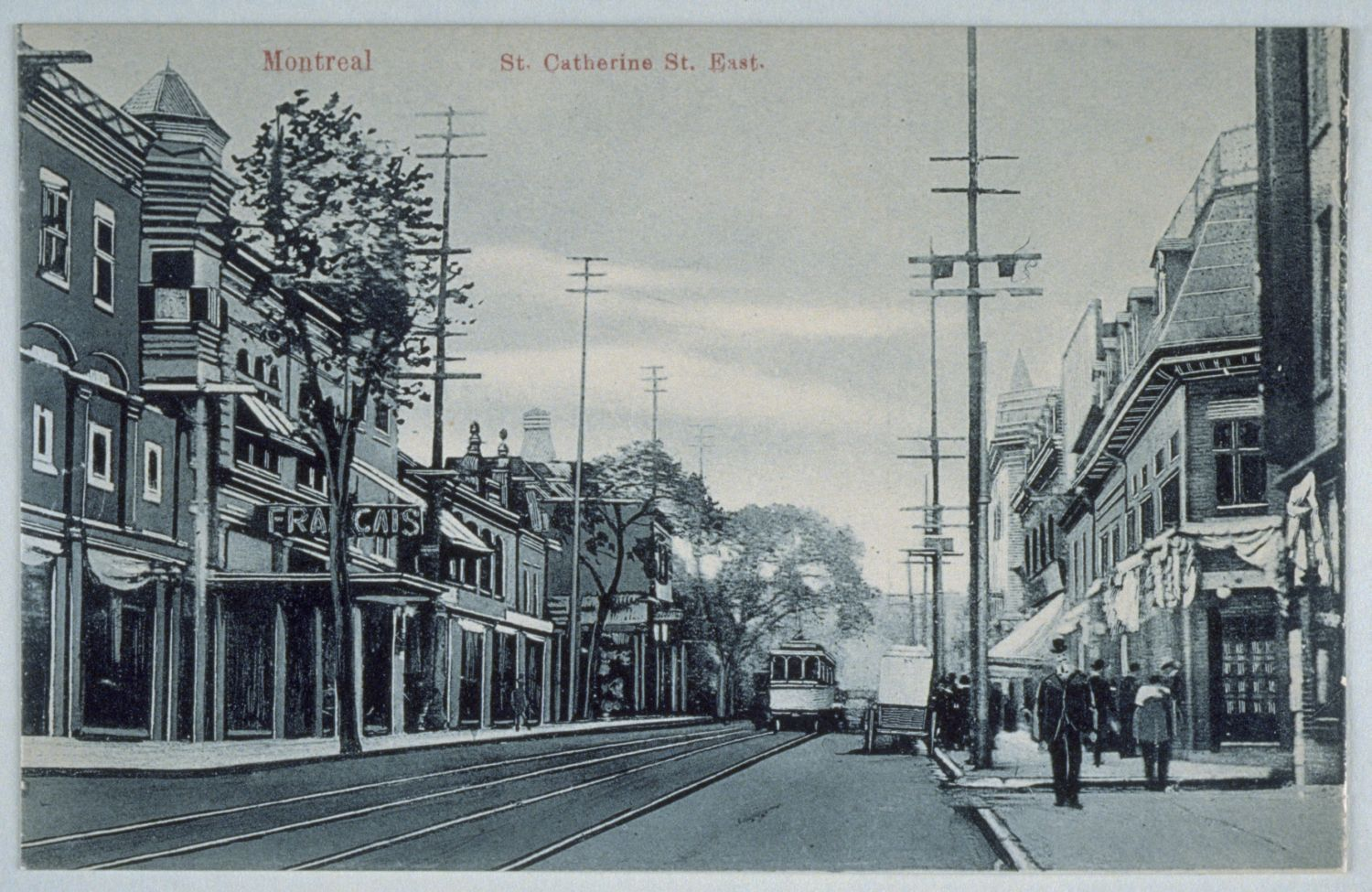
Théâtre français, located on rue Sainte-Catherine Est in Downtown Montreal, Canada, 1884.

Sainte-Catherine Street construction works in Summer, 2026

Sainte-Catherine Street was never formally planned, and as a result, it historically grew in different sections. There were four distinct stages of development:

The first stage, from Saint-Alexandre Street to Sanguinet Road, saw significant growth between 1758 and 1788. The street was 24 feet wide at this time.

The second stage started in 1820 and ended in 1860. The eastern part of the street was extended past Sanguinet to Panet, and the western section of the street was extended from Saint-Alexandre Street to McGill College Avenue in 1840. In the 1850s, Sainte-Catherine shouldered McGill College Avenue, past De la Montagne and Guy Street until it reached Atwater Avenue.

The third stage followed on from 1860, and lasted until 1890. In 1872, Sainte-Catherine advanced west to Greene Avenue, pushing past Victoria Avenue in the 1880s. In the east, the street extended to De Lorimier Avenue and Fullum Road by 1863—where it reaches to Du Havre in the next couple of years.

The fourth and final stage of development occurred from 1890 to 1910. By 1890, there had been sections that had been built in the neighborhoods of Hochelaga and Maisonneuve, and in 1910, the street stretched to Vimont Street.

In the 1950s, in order to complete the entirety of the street, segments were added on either end of the street. In the east it hooked into Notre-Dame Street, and in the west it joined with De Maisonneauve Boulevard.

== Growing popularity ==
By the end of the 19th century, Sainte-Catherine became known as the entertainment hub of Montreal.

By 1850, horse-drawn streetcars habitually lined the street. Later in 1864, the first electric-powered tramway—provided by the Montreal City Passenger Railway—was introduced . This allowed workers to get to and from their jobs in other parts of the city, as well as retail workers to the many department stores that had started up on Sainte-Catherine following World War I. This included stores like Scoggie's, Goodwin's, Morgan's, Eaton's, Simpson's, Ogilvy's and Dupuis, as well as jewellery stores like Birks.

In 1890, evening entertainment began to boom, with both English and French theatres, as well as the Academy of Music, lining the street near the intersection with Victoria Avenue.

== Retailers ==
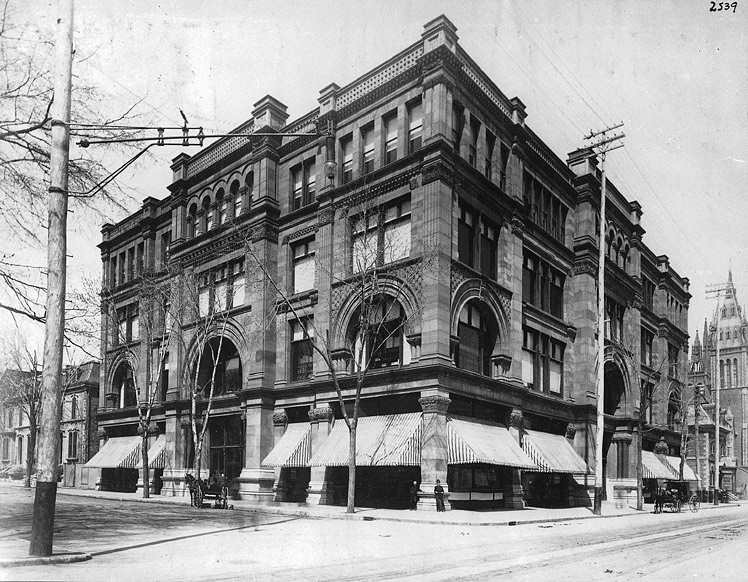
Morgan's on Sainte-Catherine St., 1890.

The Bay on St. Catherine Street, with KPMG Tower in the background

Former Eaton's store, now Montreal Eaton Centre

St. Catherine Street has been home to many of Montreal's prominent department stores, including such former retailers as Eaton's, Morgan's, Simpson's and Dupuis Frères.

Today, the Henry Morgan Building is home to Hudson's Bay Company, which acquired Morgan's in 1960. The Simpson's building is now shared by the Simons department store and a multiplex cinema, while Eaton's was converted to the Complexe Les Ailes. Dupuis Frères, located further east at St. Catherine and St. Hubert, is now a shopping mall and office complex. The Ogilvy's department store remains a fixture on St. Catherine Street, although it is now a collection of boutiques rather than a single store.

Other major retailers along the street include an Apple Store, AVEDA Experience Centre, Indigo Books and Music, Archambault, La Senza, Best Buy, Roots, Adidas, Puma, Guess, Parasuco, Zara, and an H&M flagship store at the corner of Peel and St. Catherine. Additionally, many of Montreal's most prominent shopping complexes, including the Eaton Centre, Complexe Les Ailes, Place Montreal Trust, Promenades Cathédrale, les Cours Mont-Royal, the Complexe Desjardins, Place Dupuis, Place Alexis Nihon, the Faubourg Sainte-Catherine and Westmount Square are all located along the street.

In 1916, The Hartt Shoe Company opened its Canadian flagship store at 467 St. Catherine Street (then a nationally prominent brand), near Peel Street. The address refers to the street-numbering system used at the time, which was later revised.

The Montreal Forum, once home to the Montreal Canadiens, is also located on St. Catherine Street at Atwater Street. Since its opening, it has been turned into a shopping and movie theatre complex, called the 'Pepsi Forum'. Due to the Forum's presence on this street, St. Catherine was used as the parade route for locals when the Canadiens won the Stanley Cup. This was once referred to as "the usual route" by Mayor Jean Drapeau, during the Canadiens' dynasties of the mid-century, when a win would frequently occur.

The street's segment in the district of Hochelaga-Maisonneuve is also an important commercial area in that neighbourhood.

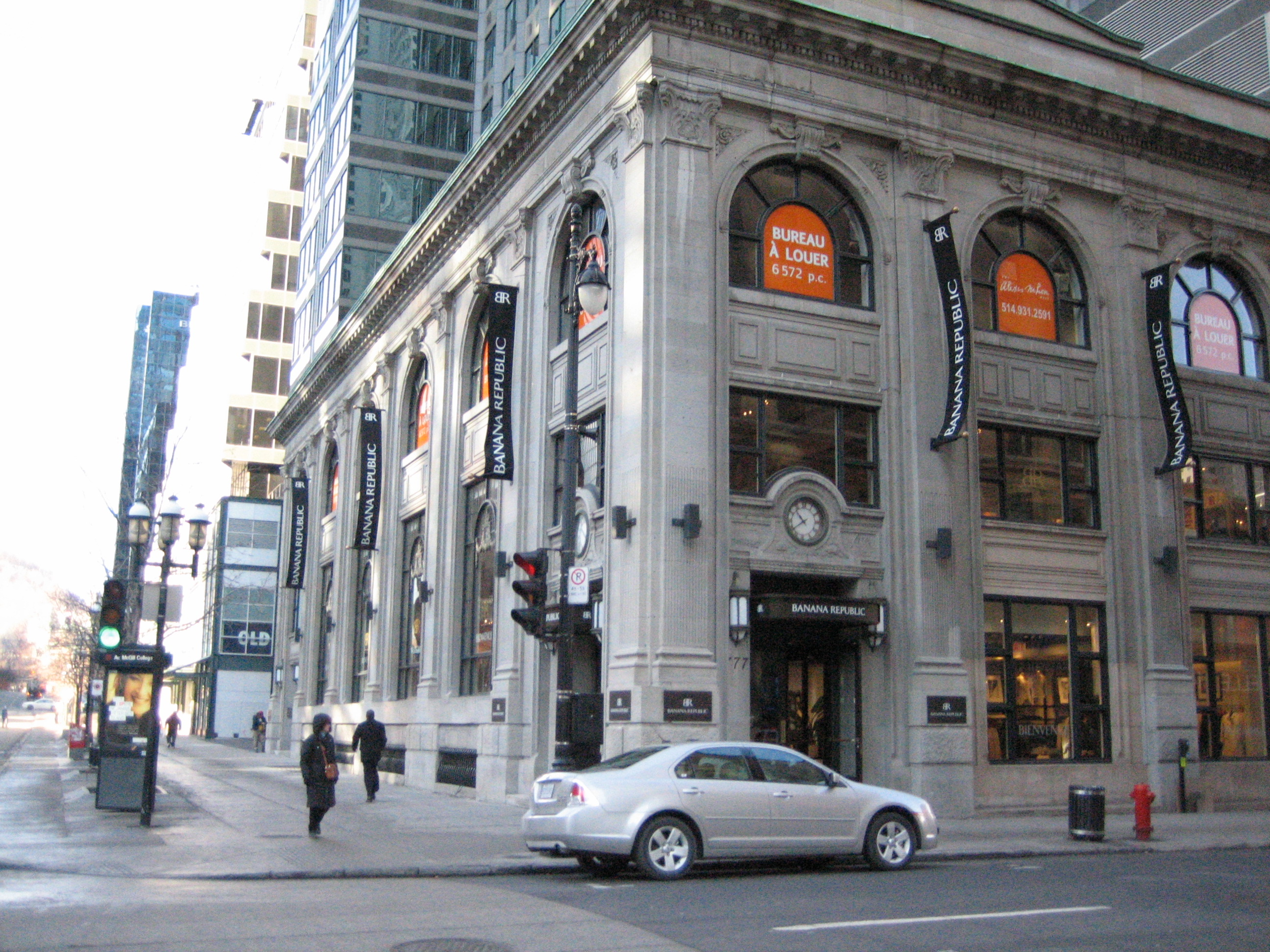
Banana Republic store at the corner of McGill College Avenue.

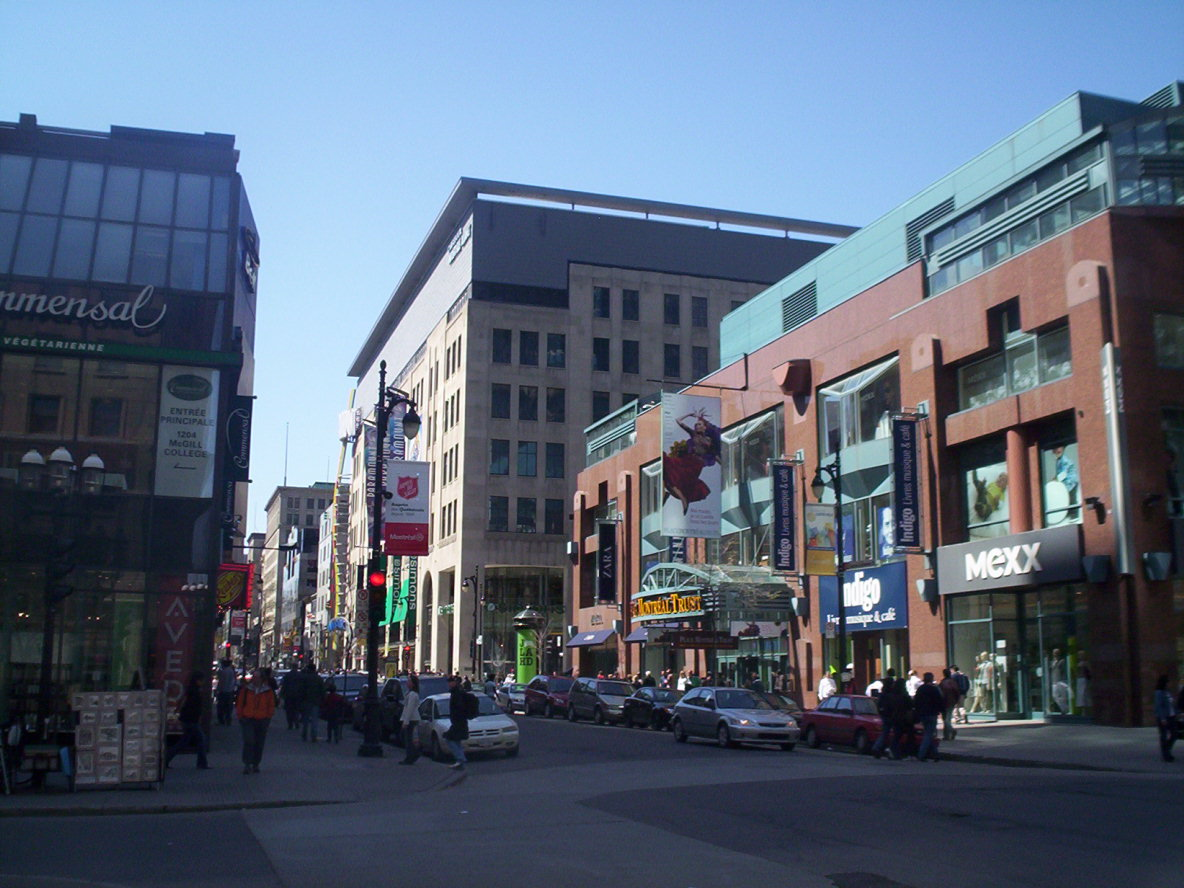
Place Montreal Trust shopping centre.

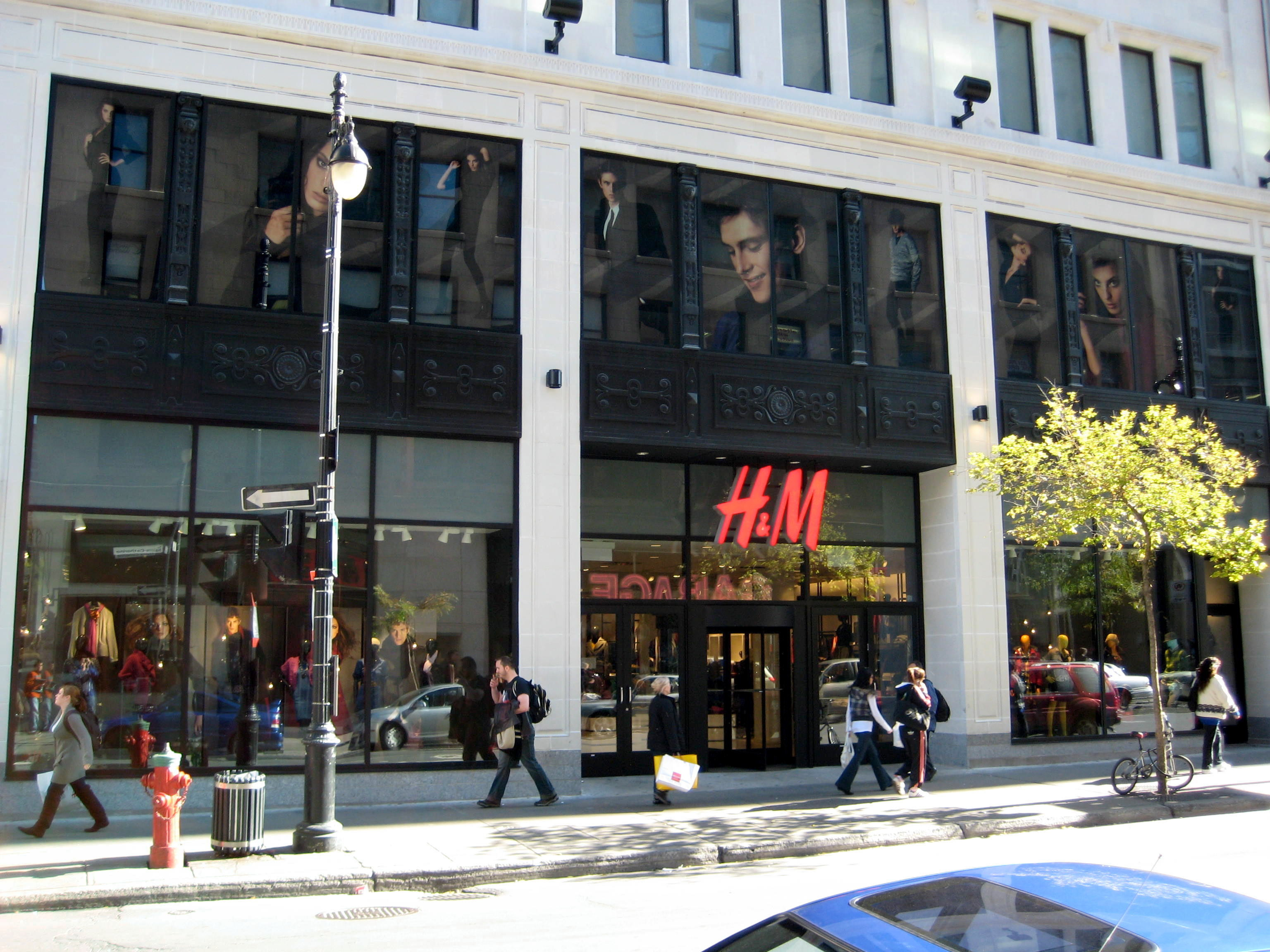
H&M store at the corner of Peel Street.

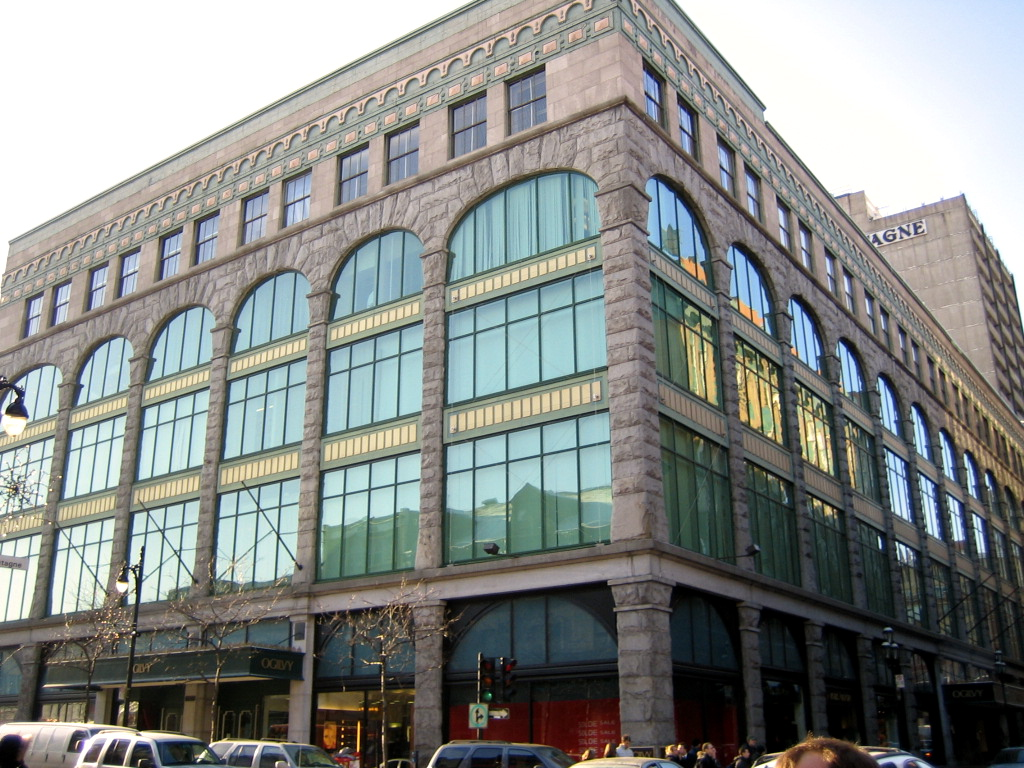
Ogilvy's department store in Montreal

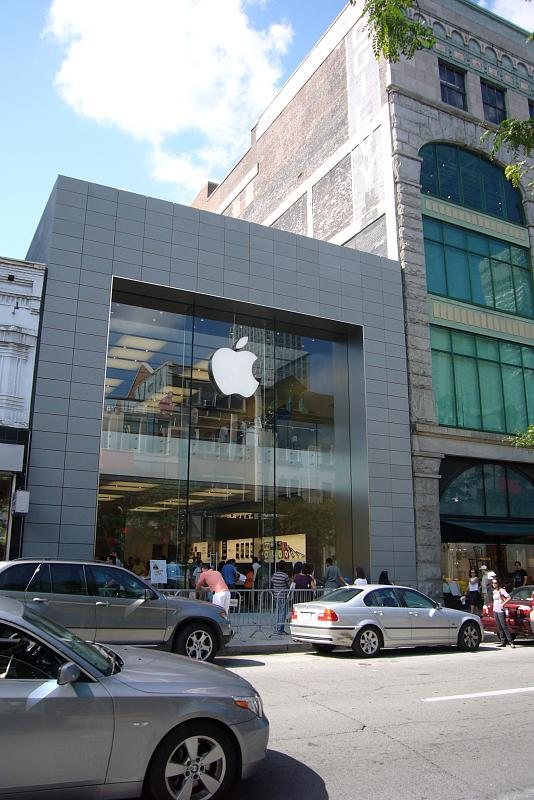
Montreal's Apple Store.

== Car-free events ==
For one weekend in July every year, Saint-Catherine Street hosts Canada's largest open-air sidewalk sale. It is estimated that over 300,000 people visit the downtown during this event. 2 km (1 mi) of the street between Jeanne-Mance Street and St. Mark is closed to vehicular traffic, and vendors from nearby shopping centres bring out their sale merchandise. There is also live entertainment along the street.

== Transit ==
The Green line of the Montreal Metro was built to serve Sainte-Catherine Street; however, to avoid disrupting traffic on the street, it was built one block to the north, under parts of Burnside Place which later became de Maisonneuve Boulevard. However, Atwater, Berri-UQAM, Beaudry and Papineau stations all have entrances located on Sainte-Catherine street. Bus service is provided by the STM's 15 Sainte-Catherine and 34 Sainte-Catherine lines which both operate 7 days a week.

== Culture ==
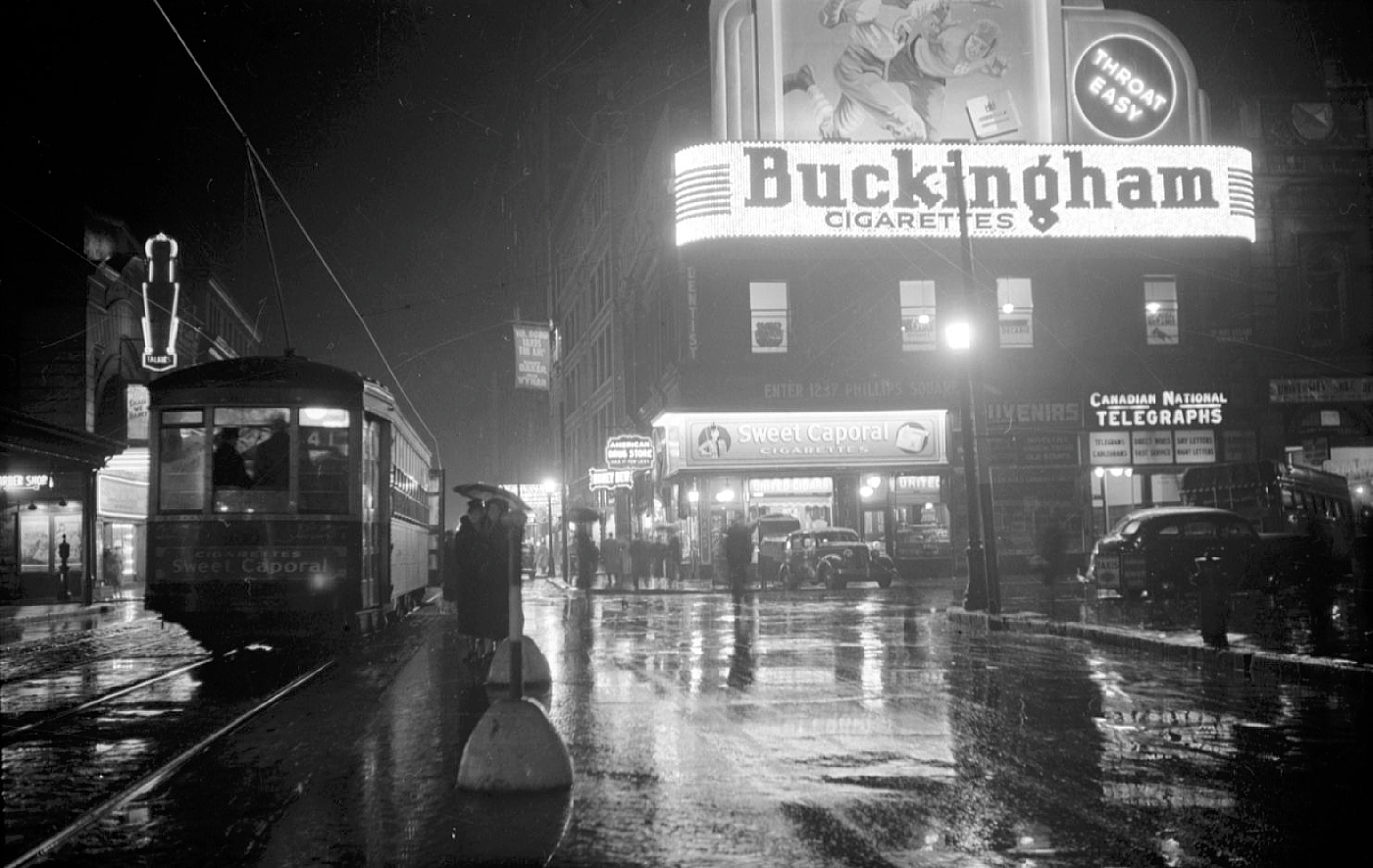
Saint Catherine Street at Phillips Square, 1937

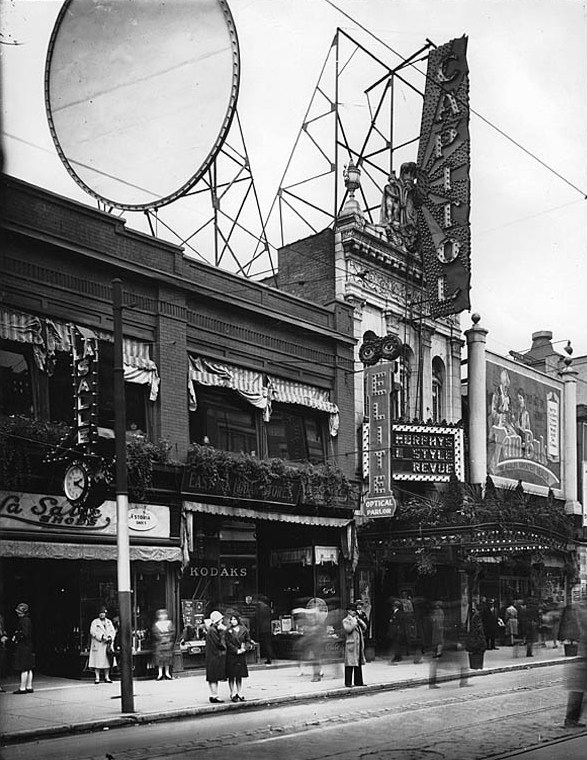
Former Capitol Theatre, 1925

Montreal's Place des Arts, the city's primary concert venue, is located on Saint Catherine, Jeanne-Mance and Saint-Urbain streets. This is in the city's Quartier des Spectacles entertainment district. The street was once home to many now-abandoned cinemas, such as the Loews, Palace, Capitol, Cinéma de Paris, York, Ouimetoscope and the Seville Theatre. This includes the now-demolished Montreal Spectrum music venue.

== Places of worship ==
Sainte-Catherine is also home to Christ Church Cathedral, the only church in Canada that sits atop a shopping mall, Promenades Cathédrale. Another prominent church, Saint James United Church, has recently had its concealing façade of commercial buildings removed. Other churches on the street include St. James the Apostle Anglican Church.

== Gay Village ==
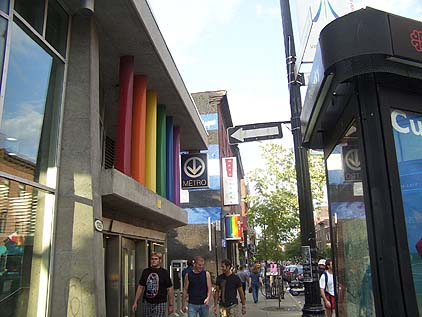
A partial view along St. Catherine East in Montréal's Gay Village, with Beaudry metro station at left

Montreal's Gay Village (French: Le Village gai) extends along Sainte-Catherine Street in the east end of downtown between Saint-Hubert and Papineau. Beaudry Metro station, on the Green Line, provides the most convenient access to the Village and sports a permanent rainbow decoration on its façade.

For most of the summer—mid-May till mid-September—Sainte-Catherine Street is completely closed to vehicular traffic through the Gay Village. This makes it one large pedestrian area allowing stores to sell outside and restaurants and bars to serve on large, open-air terrasses.

Summer is also punctuated with special events and festivals, such as the art festival FIMA, Festival International Montréal en arts, Pride Celebrations and Divers/Cité.

== Parks and Green Spaces ==
In addition to Phillips and Cabot squares, there are a few green spaces on Sainte-Catherine Street: Dorchester-Clarke and Landsdowne parks in Westmount, Place Émilie-Gamelin next to the Université du Québec à Montréal (UQAM), Jos -Montferrand, Edmond-Hamelin Park and Morgan Park.

== Gallery ==
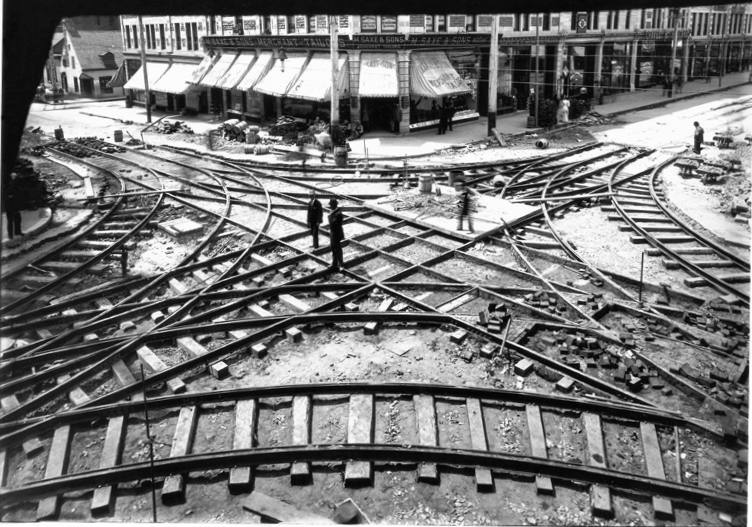
Sainte-Catherine at Saint Laurent Boulevard in 1893

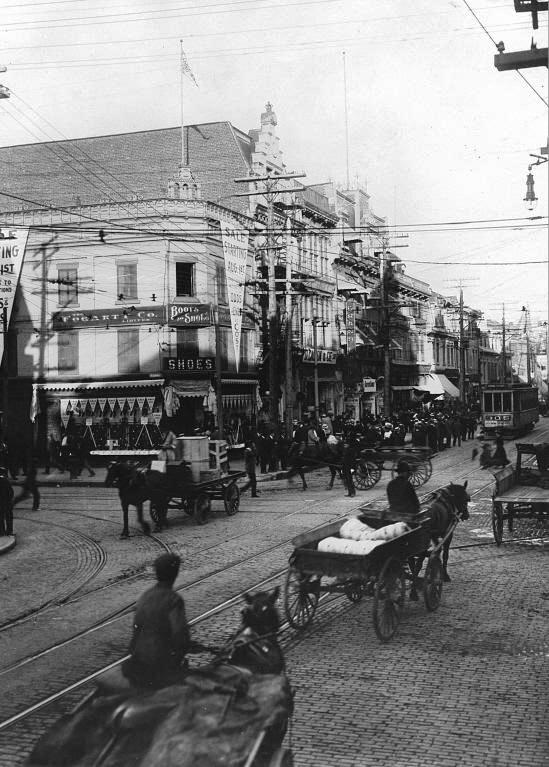
Saint Lawrence and Saint Catherine Streets, 1905.

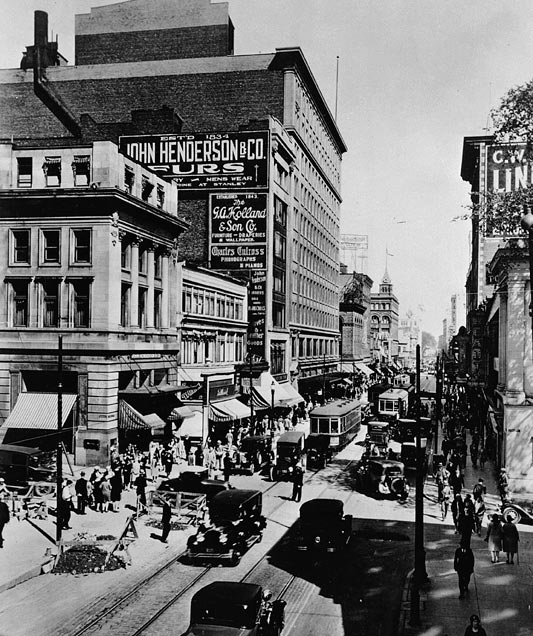
In 1930 at Stanley Street

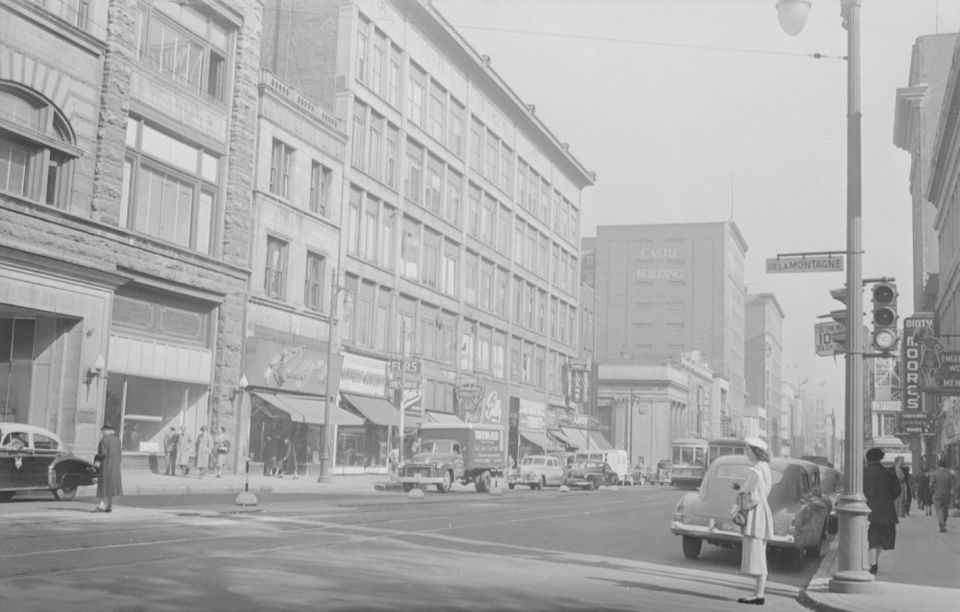
In 1943 at Montagne

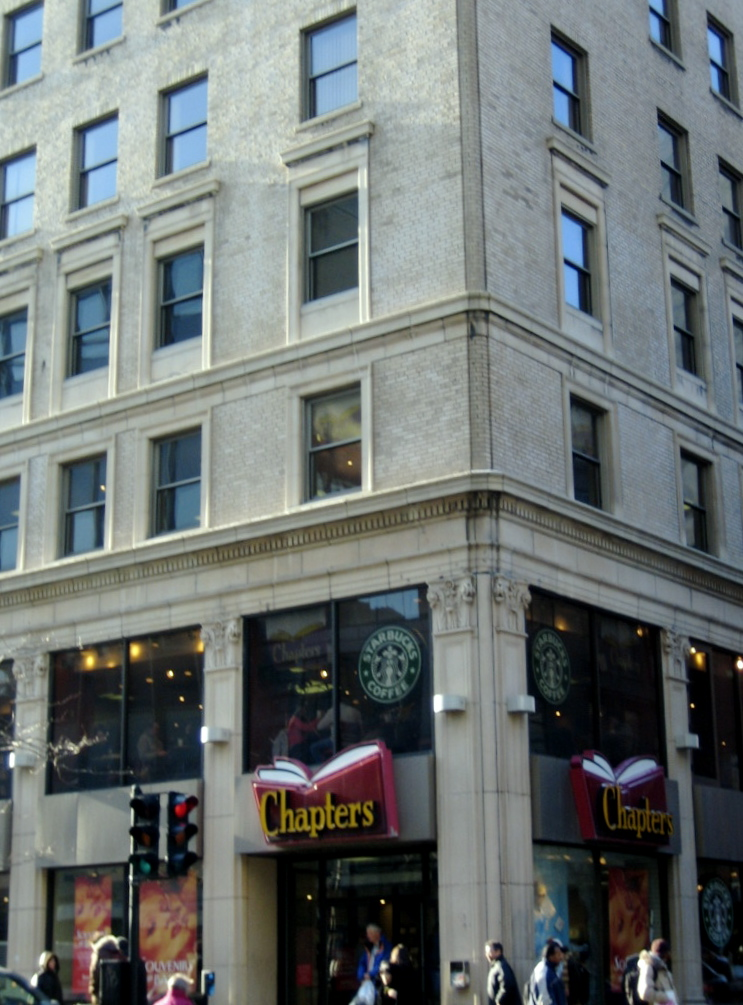
Until October 2014, a Chapters bookstore was located inside the Castle Building on the corner of Stanley St.

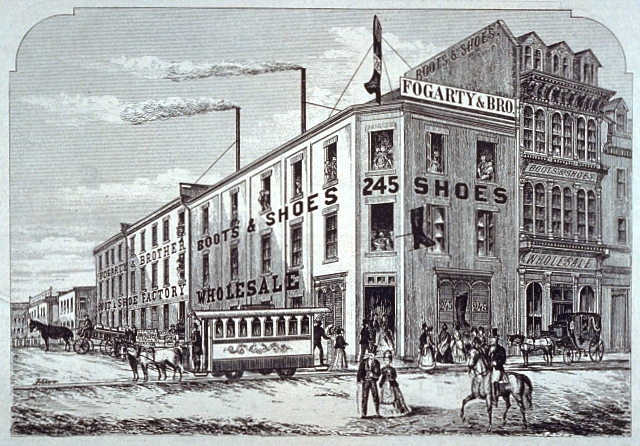
Fogarty's Factory, corner St. Catherine and St. Lawrence Main Streets, Eugene Haberer, 1871
