= York Theatre (Montreal) =

Coordinates: 45.495896°N 73.577673°W

The York Theatre was an Art deco cinema and mixed-use complex in Montreal, opened in 1938 and demolished in 2001 for the construction of the Engineering, Computer Science and Visual Arts Integrated Complex of Concordia University.

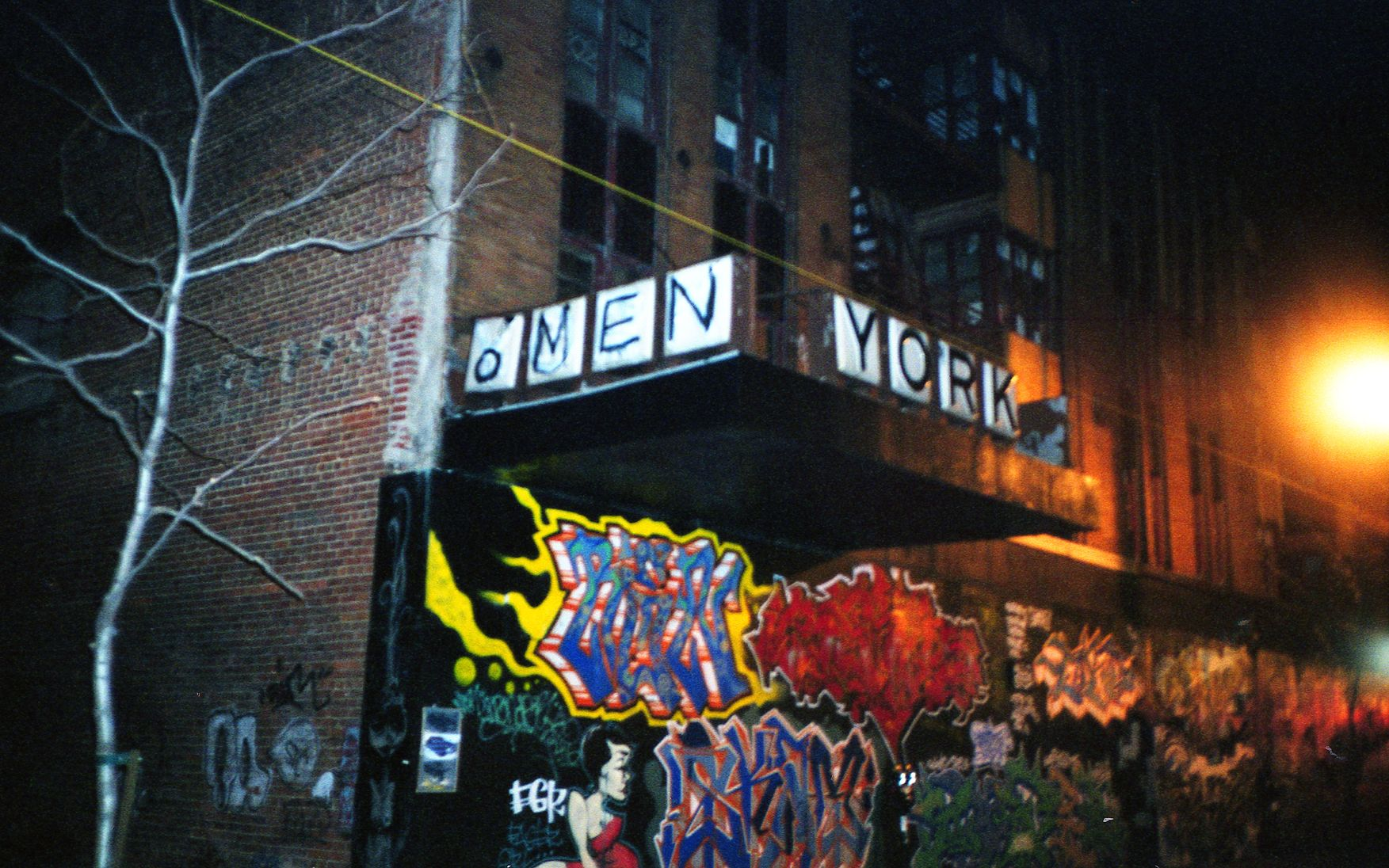
York Theatre, Montreal, March, 2000

The York was designed by architects Perry, Luke and Little, with an interior design by Emmanuel Briffa. Briffa, who had overseen interior designs of over 100 cinemas in Canada, commissioned murals by artist Kenneth Hensley Holmden for the project. These murals were badly damaged by a fire in 1989. Three of eight murals were removed and restored by the university, and are now incorporated into its new building.

Concordia purchased the complex in 1998, deciding that it was too badly deteriorated to save. It was demolished in 2001.

The building had included residential and commercial space, in addition to the cinema. It was built with a capacity of 1,200 theatre goers for the United Amusement Corporation.
