= Emmanuel Briffa =

Maltese Canadian theatre decorator

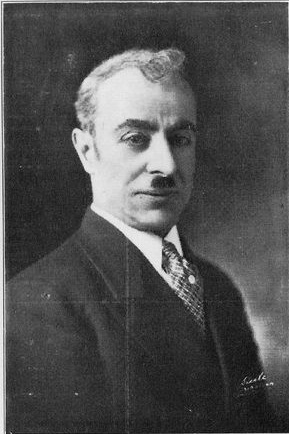
- Born: September 4, 1875; Birkirkara, Malta
- Died: 1955; Montreal, Quebec, Canada
- Resting place: Notre Dame des Neiges Cemetery
- Occupation: theatre design
- Years active: 1912-1942
- Known for: Rialto Theatre, Montreal

Emmanuel Briffa (September 4, 1875 – 1955) was a Maltese Canadian theatre decorator whose career in North America spanned thirty years, starting in 1912.

Devoted almost entirely to theatre decoration since immigrating to North America from Malta in 1912, Briffa spent several years working in the United States prior to moving to Canada in 1924. In Canada, Briffa established himself as one of the most sought after theatre decorators, decorating approximately one hundred theatres, including the Capitol Theatre in Moncton, New Brunswick.

== Quebec ==
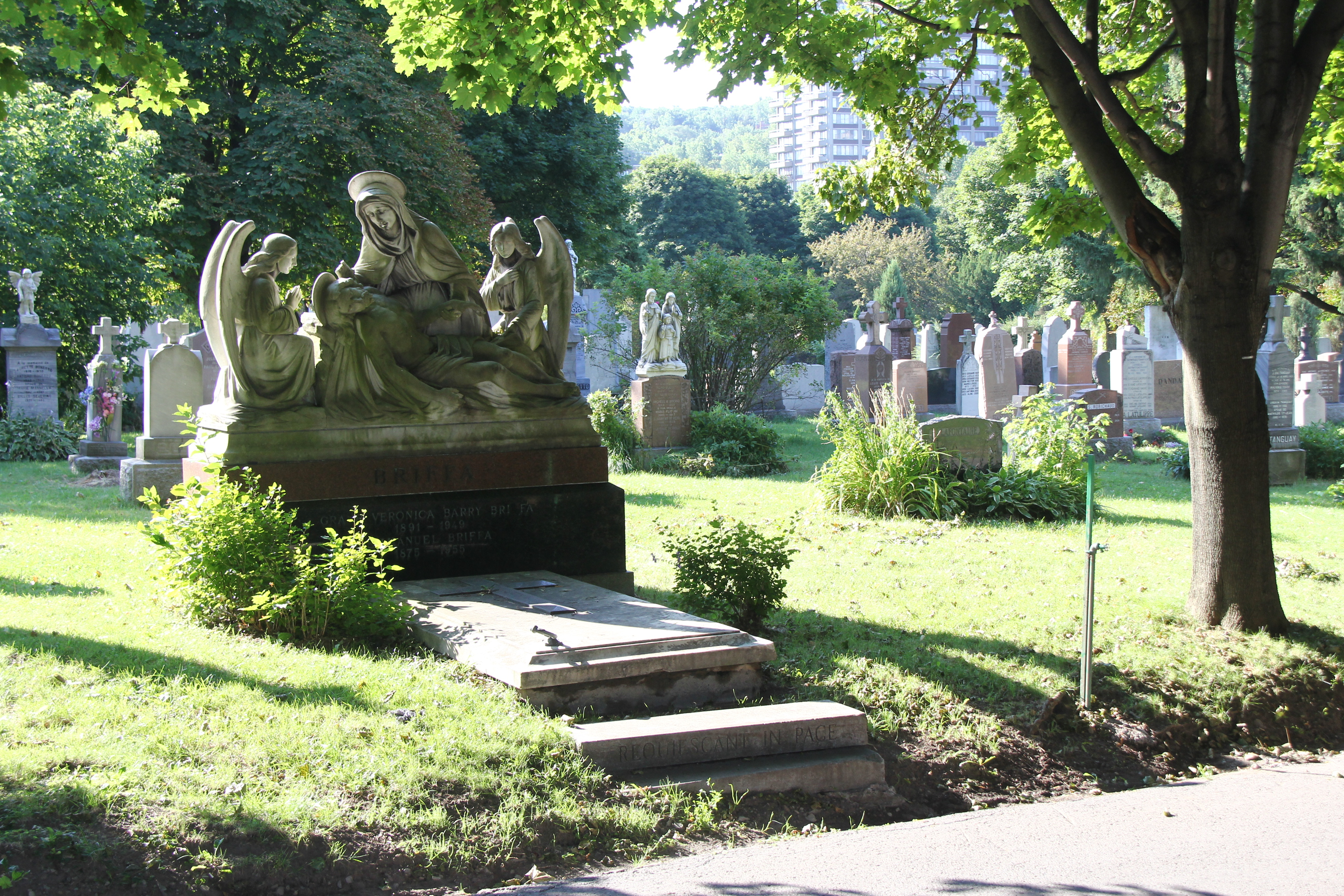
Briffa's tombstone in Montreal.

His cinema designs in Quebec included the Louis XVI style design for the Rialto Theatre, a National Historic Site of Canada, the former Snowdon Theatre, Seville Theatre, Cinema V, York Theatre as well as the Granada Theatre in Sherbrooke, Quebec, also a National Historic Site.

After his death in 1955, he was entombed at the Notre Dame des Neiges Cemetery in Montreal.
