= Le National (theater) =

Coordinates: 45°31′07″N 73°33′21″W

- Le National in 2026
- Interactive map of Le National
- Location: Montreal
- Opening date: 1900

Le National (first Théâtre National Français, then Théâtre National until 2006) is one of the oldest theaters in Montréal (Québec). It is situated on 1220 Saint Catherine Street, at the corner of rue Beaudry (Beaudry station), in the city's Gay Village.

== History ==
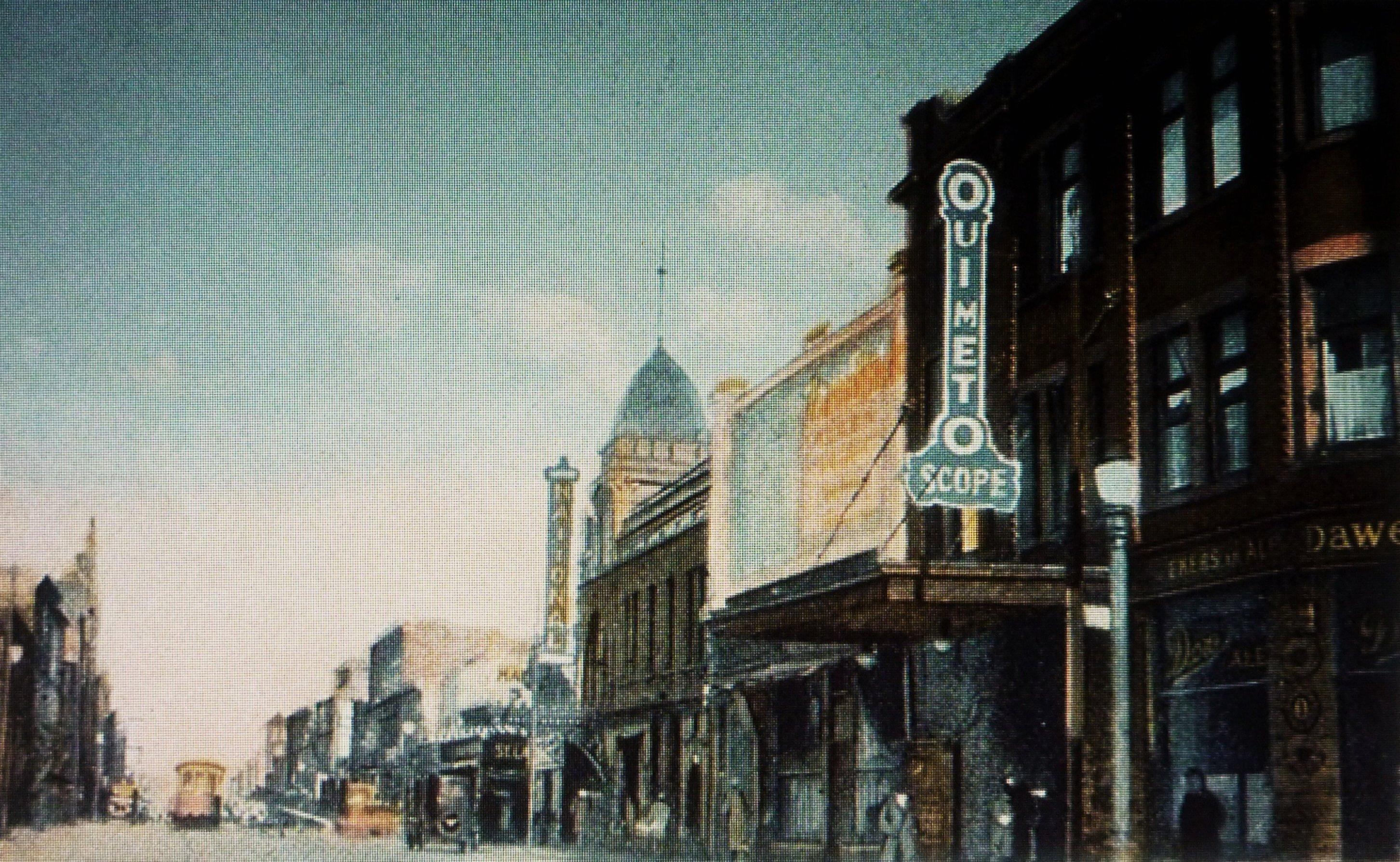
Le National around 1910, with the Ouimetoscope in the front

On August 12, 1900, one of the first professional theaters built by French speakers in the Americas—the Théâtre National Français—was inaugurated. Located in the heart of the city's French quarter, it enjoyed a period of great success following a difficult start. Its founder, Julien Daoust, envisioned a national stage—driven primarily by artists born in or who had immigrated to Canada—that would offer the French-Canadian community a reflection of its own identity through the dramatized portrayal of its reality. He brought an architect, Albert Sincennes, and a photographer, A. Racette, into the project. The building was designed to hold one thousand seats, but the promoters had been overly ambitious.

The project was quickly taken over by Georges Gauvreau, the neighboring restaurant owner, with cultural ambitions. Together with actor Paul Cazeneuve, he adapted major Broadway hits of the era into French for Montreal audiences. Subsequently, the Théâtre National Français also presented original productions centered on figures such as Louis-Joseph de Montcalm, Joseph Montferrand, and De Lorimier.

He was replaced in 1918 by Paul Gury, but it was primarily under the direction of Rose Ouellette—known as "La Poune"—between 1936 and 1953 that the theater experienced its golden age, attracting the stars of Montreal's French-language burlesque scene. For 17 years, crowds flocked to see the revues staged by "La Poune." All the major burlesque performers of that generation appeared there, including Juliette Petrie, Arthur Petrie, Manda Parent, Hector Pellerin, Georges Leduc, Simone Roberval, Paul Desmarteaux, Juliette Huot, Olivier Guimond son and Olivier Guimond, father, Paul Hébert and later, among others, Pierre Thériault, Jacques Normand, Lucie Mitchell, Léo Rivest.

Facing competition from television, Rose Ouellette left the Théâtre National in 1953; the venue subsequently served as a neighborhood movie theater, a Chinese-language cinema, and later a gay cinema. Conservatoire d'art dramatique de Montréal was also housed at the Théâtre National from 1968 to 1973. In 1984, following the police crackdown on the Stanley Street gay village, Bernard Rousseau opened the “Cinéma du Village” in the venue, one of the first establishments in what became the new gay village. The cinema was an important community place, and because of the financial troubles, showed various movies from arthouse to pornography, before closing in 1992. Since 2006, the venue has been owned by La Tribu/La Compagnie Larivée Cabot Champagne; renamed "Le National." it now hosts rock concerts and performances by French-language singer-songwriters.
