= Olivier Guimond =

Canadian actor (1914–1971)

Olivier Guimond (fils)
- Born: May 21, 1914; Montreal, Quebec, Canada
- Died: November 29, 1971 (aged 57); Montreal, Quebec, Canada
- Resting place: Notre Dame des Neiges Cemetery, Montreal
- Other names: Oliver, Ti-Zoune Jr.
- Occupation(s): Actor, humorist
- Years active: 1932–1971
- Known for: Cré Basile; 1970 Bye Bye
- Style: Burlesque
- Spouses: Evelyne Drummond (1934–1935); Jeanne-d'Arc Charlebois (1946–1953); Manon Brunelle (1967)
- Children: 3, including Richard Darbois
- Father: Olivier Guimond

Olivier Guimond (fils; May 21, 1914 – November 29, 1971) was a Canadian actor and humorist. He is the father of voice actor Richard Darbois.

== Biography ==
=== Early life ===
Olivier Guimond came from a family of burlesque artists. At the beginning of his career, he was called "Ti-Zoune junior" since the stage name of Olivier Guimond (père) was "Ti-Zoune". His mother, Effie McDonald, baptized him Oliver as she is English speaking. Later, Radio-Canada decided to call him Olivier.

At the age of 7, Olivier Guimond was placed by his parents at the Collège Mont-Saint-Louis in Montreal, where he stayed until he was 16.

In 1932, he convinced his father to let him perform on stage. At the age of 18, he made his debut at the Théâtre Impérial de Québec. Dreaming of becoming the star of his burlesque show, he left his parents' troupe. His father did not take kindly to this affront.

In 1934, Jean Grimaldi noticed him and hired him to be part of his troupe with which he performed until 1957. He sang and played comedy roles, notably with Manda Parent. It was with her that he created the sketch Trois heures du matin, which became a classic of Quebec burlesque.

=== Personal life ===
He married Evelyn Drummond, a dancer in Jean Grimaldi's troupe. At the same time, he met the singer Alys Robi, with whom he also fell in love. As a result, his marriage to Evelyn Drummond lasted only nine months. His wife left him and went into exile in the United States. His passionate relationship with Alys Robi came to an end as her career took off internationally.

Shortly after, he met Jeanne-D'Arc Charlebois, a singer with the Grimaldi troupe, whom Guimond married in 1946. He has two sons with Jeanne-D'Arc Charlebois, Richard Darbois and Marc Guimond, who died in an August 1964 car accident in Europe. His son Richard Darbois is a well-known actor and voice actor. In the mid-1950s, Jeanne-D'Arc Charlebois left Olivier Guimond and Quebec. Olivier Guimond met Manon Brunelle in 1959 with whom he had another son, Luc Guimond.

=== Rise to fame ===
Olivier Guimond quickly made a name for himself in Montreal's burlesque troupes and played with the best actors of this tradition such as Arthur Petrie, Juliette Petrie, Rose Ouellette, and Paul Desmarteaux, with whom he formed a notorious comic duo early in his career. He is also remembered for the duet with Denis Drouin, his sidekick. In the 1950s, he also rubbed shoulders with Paul Berval, Jacques Normand, Gilles Pellerin, and others in the Montreal cabarets that were in full swing at the time.

That year, producer Noël Gauvin hired him, and Olivier Guimond became the star of the variety show Music-Hall, broadcast by Radio-Canada. On Télé-Métropole, starting in 1965, he played the lead role in the television series Cré Basile, written by his friend Marcel Gamache. He also played in other series, including Le Zoo du Capitaine Bonhomme, À la branche d'Olivier, Smash, and in operettas, including Les Trois valses and La Vie parisienne.

His popularity reached records and his favorite expression "Quo qua fa là là" was on everyone's lips. In 1966, one year after the debut of the series Cré Basile, he was crowned "Monsieur Radio-Télévision" at the Gala des Artistes. He was recognized as one of the greatest comedians Quebec has ever known.

The sketch, written by Gilles Richer, of the soldier guarding a wealthy Westmount home during the October Crisis in the 1970 Bye Bye, in which Denis Drouin played the rich English Canadian, is one of the most famous numbers in the history of this annual comedy magazine. The sketch was shown again during the 1971 Bye Bye in tribute to the deceased. Guimond's innate aptitude for comedic expression and his extraordinary flexibility brought him close to Charlie Chaplin.

=== Death ===
On November 29, 1971, Olivier Guimond died of sepsis at the Maisonneuve Hospital in Montreal at the age of 57. On December 2, his funeral took place in the Church of Saint-Alphonse d'Youville in Montreal. Quebec was in mourning: a crowd of 25,000 people gathered around the church for the ceremony and 100,000 people came to the funeral home in three days. He is buried in Notre Dame des Neiges Cemetery.

== Filmography ==
- 1954–1960: Le Survenant (TV series): M. Bezeau
- 1957: Le Survenant (film): M. Bezeau
- 1958: Marie-Didace (TV series): M. Bezeau
- 1959: César (TV series): rôle muet (genre Charlie Chaplin)
- 1964: Le Zoo du Capitaine Bonhomme (youth show): Freddy Washington
- 1965: Give Me a Hand
- 1965: Cré Basile (TV series): Basile Lebrun
- 1967: Place à Olivier Guimond (TV show)
- 1970: À la branche d'Olivier (TV series): Olivier Beauchemin
- 1971: Smash (Radio-Canada TV variety series)

== Awards ==
- Olivier Guimond is elected Mr. Television in 1966.
- Three orange prizes from TV Hebdo were awarded to the artist most sympathetic to journalists. After his death, the orange prize was renamed the Olivier Guimond prize.
- To mark the tenth anniversary of his death, in 1981 the City of Montreal established Olivier Guimond Park in the block formed by Dickson, Boileau, Monsabré, and Pierre de Coubertin streets, very close to the place where Olivier Guimond lived for many years.
- In 1986, the residents of Montreal's Mercier-Ouest district decided to name their CLSC the "CLSC Olivier-Guimond".
- In 1999, the Gala des Oliviers was named in memory of Olivier Guimond. This annual event highlights and publicly rewards the work of Quebec artists and artisans working in the field of humor.
- In 2010, the city of Rigaud pays tribute to him by naming the newly built service area on the side of Highway 40 the Olivier Guimond building. Inside, there is a photo montage that illustrates the life and career of Olivier Guimond. It is also the name of the former rest stop located a little further west.
- In 2014 in Montreal, he was honoured on the occasion of his 100th birthday with several events including two outdoor shows: "César à la belle étoile", an outdoor projection with excerpts from Olivier Guimond in the 1959 series César accompanied by a pianist on stage recreating the era of silent movies, and "Un peu, beaucoup, passionnément", a Cirque Éloize show as part of Just for Laughs. Canada Post, for its part, is issuing a new stamp with his effigy.
- The local Quebec odonymy recalls the actor in several places: Place Olivier-Guimond in Saint-Laurent (Montreal), rue Olivier-Guimond in Mont-Laurier, Pointe-Fortune, Rigaud, Rougemont, and in Sainte-Julie, the Olivier-Guimond Parks in Montreal and Boisbriand.

== Anecdotes ==
- Olivier Guimond is remembered for the slogan "Lui, y connaît ça", which appeared in 1966 in an advertisement for Labatt brewery.
- Olivier Guimond was the star of the inauguration of the Théâtre des Variétés in Montreal on September 23, 1967.
- In 1997, Quebec actor Benoît Brière played Olivier Guimond in the television series Cher Olivier, broadcast on the TVA network and directed by André Mélançon. The series was a success with both journalists and the public and won nine awards, including the audience award at the 1997 Prix Gémeaux.

== See also ==
=== Bibliography ===
- Petrie, Juliette (1977). Quand on revoit tout ça! : [Le burlesque au Québec, 1914–1960]. Jean Leclerc. [Montréal]: [Productions Vieux rêves]. ISBN 0-88604-006-X. OCLC 6144424.
- Guimond, Manon (1994). Olivier Guimond. Outremont, Québec: Quebecor. ISBN 2-89089-972-1. OCLC 30514518.
- Guimond, Luc (1997). Olivier Guimond, mon pere, mon heros. Montreal: Edimag. ISBN 9782921735377. OCLC 1150949927.

=== External links ===
- Olivier Guimond at IMDb
- Olivier Guimond discography at Discogs
- "Olivier Guimond". Dictionary of Canadian Biography (online ed.). University of Toronto Press. 1979–2016.
- "Olivier Guimond Jr. (1914–1971) – Find a Grave..." www.findagrave.com.
- "Olivier Guimond – Comédien | Qui Joue Qui?". Qui Joue Qui ? – La référence en séries et téléromans québécois.
