= Jean-Baptiste Lafrenière =

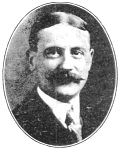
- Born: Jean-Baptiste Lafrenière; 1874; Maskinongé, Quebec
- Died: January 4, 1912 (aged 37); Montréal
- Education: Collège Saint-Joseph; Université Laval (dropped out)
- Occupations: Composer, musician
- Years active: 1885–1912
- Spouse: Victoria Danis
- Children: 2

Jean-Baptiste Lafrenière (1874 – January 4, 1912) was a Canadian pianist and composer noted for his work in the ragtime genre.

== Biography ==
Born in Maskinongé, Quebec in 1874, Lafrenière grew up in Montreal and Louiseville before beginning his musical education at the collège Saint-Joseph in Berthierville. He would go on to study at Université Laval in other disciplines before reorienting back towards music in 1893 at 19 years old.

From 1885 to 1898, he gave piano lessons and served as chapelmaster at the Saint-Charles-Borromée church in Joliette and led the local Ceclian Society. He established himself in Montreal, where he played in cabarets and worked in the Théâtre National and the Théâtre Français.

At the beginning of the 20th century, he began to venture into modern musical genres, taking a particular interest in the rise of ragtime in the United States. Collaborating with Léo-Ernest Ouimet, he began his career at Ouimetoscope, where he worked until becoming an accompanist at the Théâtre des Nouveautés.

He composed many works; for the most part, he published in Le Passe-Temps. He most well-known piece is Raggity-Rag, which was reissued in 1967.

Nicknamed "The Canadian Strauss", despite his talents, Lafrenière lived a life of poverty and died during a bout with tuberculosis on January 4, 1912, aged only 37. Thanks to the work of Canadian pianist Mimi Blais^{(fr)}, Lafrenière's music has regained popularity and is now regularly heard on Radio-Classique Montréal.

== Works ==
=== Ragtime ===
- Hip! Hip! Hourra! (two-step, 1907)
- Raggity-Rag (two-step, 1907)
- Sillyâss (two-step, 1907)
- Ben (two-step for orchestra, 1911)
- Balloon Rag (two-step for piano, 1911)
- Taxi Rag (two-step, 1911)
- John Chow Chow Rag (rag two-step, 1912)

=== Waltzes ===
- Margo (brilliant waltz, 1900)
- Yvette (waltz, 1901)
- Valse-lanciers (waltz for piano, 1903)
- valse-lanciers sur des airs d'opéra (1905)
- Valse miroir (1907)
- Madelon (1907)
- 1909 Lancers' Waltz (1909)
- Jannôt valse (1911)
- National (valse-lanciers, 1911)
- Patria (grand waltz for piano, 1911)
- Fleurs de Neige (1912)
- Aeroplane Waltz (1912)
- Jeannette (1912)
- S'VON (elegant waltz, 1912)
- Bohemian Lager Waltz (1919, posthumous publication)

=== Various Pieces for Piano ===
- Les Cascades (brilliant caprice, 1899)
- Adriano (caprice, 1901)
- Victo (mazurka, 1904)
- Charmeuse (gavotte, 1907)
- À la Québécoise (dance for piano, 1908, issued to commemorate the 300th anniversary of Quebec City)
- Mario (characteristic dance, 1914, posthumous publication)
- Railleuse (gavotte, 1914, posthumous publication)

=== Melodies ===
- Alfred (lost, 1895)
- L'Étoile du Nord (lost, 1896)
- Notre chef (1899)
- Le Couronnement (1902)
- Marche Nationale (1904)
- La Marche des travailleurs (1927, posthumous publication)

=== Sacred Pieces ===
- Messe de Noël (lost, 1894)
- Pace Domine (lost, 1897)
- Ecce Fidelis (lost, 1897)
- Tantum Ergo (lost, 1897)
