= Maskinongé River =

Maskinongé River "Rivière Maskinongé" (in French)
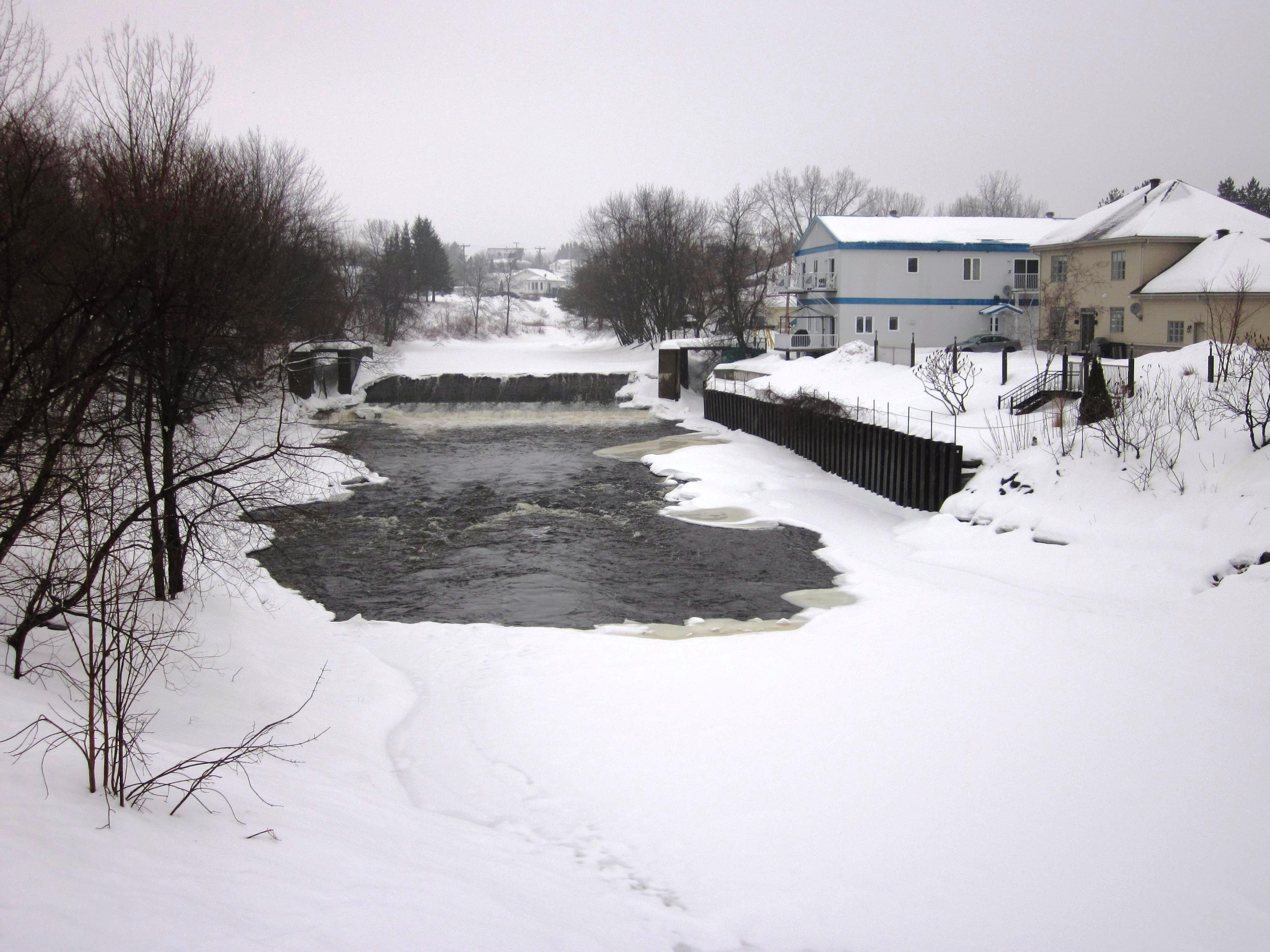
- Maskinongé River at Maskinongé, Quebec

Location
- Country: Canada
- Province: Quebec
- Region: Mauricie

Physical characteristics
- Source: Lake Maskinongé
  - location: Saint-Gabriel-de-Brandon, Lanaudière, Quebec, Canada
  - coordinates: 46°19′16″N 72°21′42″W
  - elevation: 142 m (466 ft)
- Mouth: Lake Saint-Pierre
  - location: Maskinongé, Mauricie, Quebec, Canada
  - coordinates: 46°09′48″N 73°01′06″W
  - elevation: 3 m (9.8 ft)

Basin features
- Tributaries
  - left: (from the mouth) Ruisseau du rang Double, décharge du lac du rang Double, décharge du Lac Marianne, décharge du Lac François, ruisseau Lafrenière, rivière Blanche, Rivière Mandeville.
  - right: (from the mouth) La Grande Décharge, Rivière de l'Ormière, ruisseau Penotte, La Grande Coulée, ruisseau au Castor, décharge du Petit lac à Nadon, ruisseau Charbonneau.

The Maskinongé River is located north of the administrative region of Lanaudière and west of the administrative region of Mauricie, in Quebec, in Canada.

The river has a total length of 40 km. It takes its source in Maskinongé Lake, located in Saint-Gabriel-de-Brandon. It crosses the municipalities of Saint-Gabriel-de-Brandon, Saint-Gabriel, and Saint-Didace in the region of Lanaudière; then Saint-Justin, Louiseville, and Maskinongé before pour into the north shore of Lake Saint-Pierre at the height of this municipality.

== Toponymy ==
The name of the river comes from the muskellunge ("Esox masquinongy"), a species of pike from North America. Its name comes from the Algonquin and means "deformed pike".

== Geography ==
=== Course ===
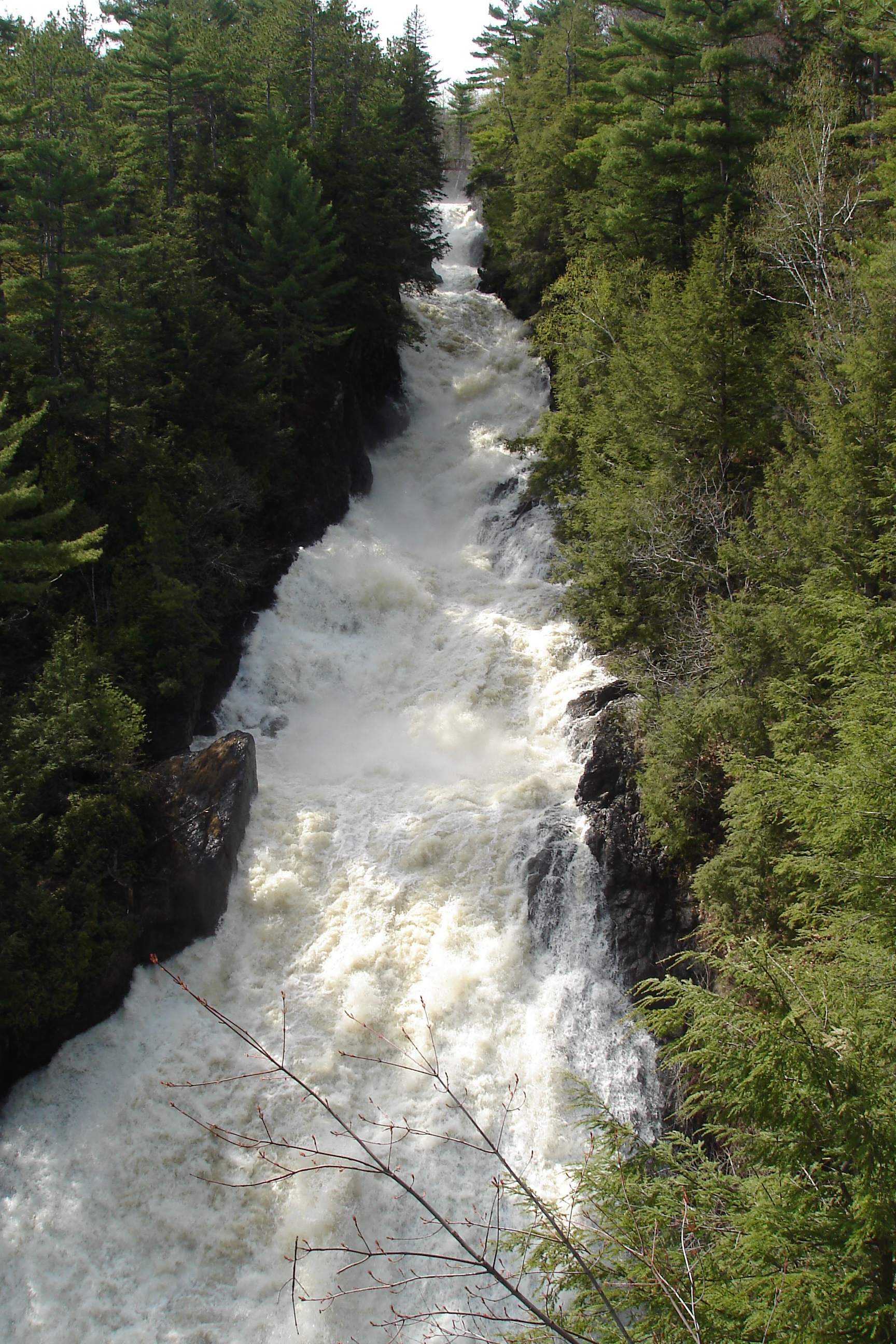
Falls of Sainte-Ursule

The Maskinongé River begins its course at an altitude of 142 m in lake of the same name. It then flows south-east for a distance of 52 km and flows into the St. Lawrence River at Maskinongé altitude of 3 m. It has two major gradients: the Lauzon Falls where it drops from 30 m and the Saint-Ursula Falls where it drops from 70 m.

=== Geology ===
The upstream section of the Sainte-Ursule Falls is part of the Laurentides, a section of the Canadian Shield. The latter formed a billion years ago and was probably as high as the Himalayas. A slow erosion process has brought it back to its current level. The downstream section is part of the St. Lawrence Platform.

=== Population ===
The basin was inhabited by a unit of 14,000 people in 2006. The largest urban agglomeration in the basin is the town of Saint-Gabriel, which is located on the shore of Lake Maskinongé.

== Natural environment ==
Over forty species of fish are found in the Maskinongé River and its tributaries. The main sporting species are the brook trout (Salvelinus fontinalis) and the muskellunge (fish) (Esox masquinongy). There are also the red knight (Moxostoma macrolepidotum), Ambloplites rupestris, brown trout (Salmo trutta), Semotilus corporalis, Perca flavescens, the horned mule, 'Semotilus atromaculatus', black sucker (Catostomus commersonii) and brown bullhead (Ameiurus nebulosus).

== History ==
The Attikameks used the Maskinongé River as a route from Matawinie to Trois-Rivières. In 1700, French settlers began settling in Maskinongé. As for Lake Maskinongé, the first settlers settled there in 1818. The north of the basin was occupied from 1880 by the club Mastigouche, a private club of hunting and fishing. This was nationalized in the 1970s and integrated into the Mastigouche Wildlife Reserve and the Nymphs' Nest.

== Sources ==
- Deléglise, Delphine; Giroux, Justine; Lambert, Michel (2014). Plan Directeur de l'eau: Zone de gestion intégrée des ressources en eau de la rivière Maskinongé (PDF) (Report) (in French). AGIR Maskinongé.
- Maskinonge River Subwatershed Plan (PDF) (Report). Lake Simcoe Region Conservation Authority. 2010.
- Portrait et diagnostic du Plan directeur de l’eau du bassin versant de la rivière Maskinongé (Report) (in French). Association pour la gestion intégrée de la rivière Maskinongé. 2008. AGIRM2008.

== See also ==
- Mandeville, Quebec, a municipality
- Saint-Gabriel-de-Brandon, a municipality
- Saint-Didace, Quebec, a municipality
- Saint-Édouard-de-Maskinongé, Quebec, a municipality
- Saint-Justin, Quebec, a municipality
- Sainte-Ursule, Quebec, a municipality
- Maskinongé, Quebec
- Maskinongé Regional County Municipality
- Lake Maskinongé, a body of water
- Lake Saint-Pierre, a lake of water
- Rivière Blanche, a river
- Mandeville River, a watercourse
- River of the Ormière, a river
- List of rivers of Quebec
