= Alys Robi =

Canadian singer (1923–2011)

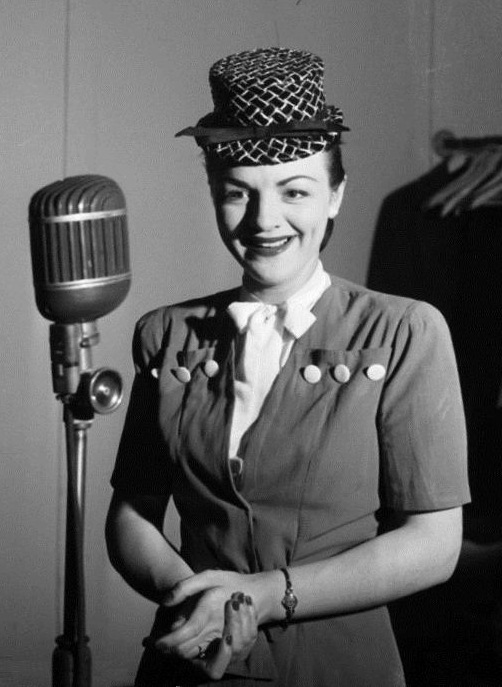
- Robi during the recording of the radio show Revoir Paris in 1945

Background information
- Born: Alice Robitaille; February 3, 1923; Quebec City, Canada
- Died: May 28, 2011 (aged 88) Montreal, Quebec, Canada
- Genres: Latin American music
- Instrument: Vocals
- Years active: 1930–2011

Alice Robitaille (February 3, 1923 – May 28, 2011), known professionally as Alys Robi, was a Canadian singer from Quebec, mainly remembered for her later French interpretations of Latin American songs.

== Youth ==
Born in 1923 in the Quebec City neighbourhood of Saint-Sauveur, Robitaille displayed talent for singing and acting at a very young age. She first performed on-stage at the Capitol Theatre at 7. At the time, she had already sung on-air with the CHRC radio station and was a real phenomenon in the whole city.

== Career ==
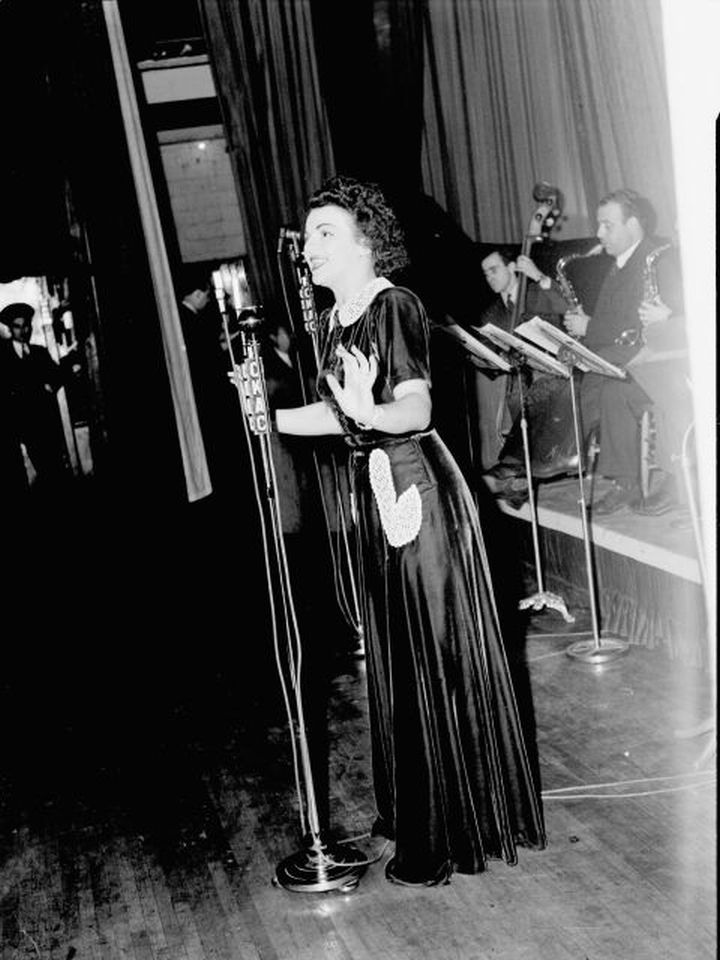
Robi performing for CKAC in 1943

At 13 she moved to the Théâtre National, on Montreal's Saint Catherine Street. Under the direction of Rose Ouellette, she learned acting and singing during a 75-week engagement. She continued her career in the Montreal cabarets, making radio appearances. For a time during the war, she also hosted a French radio show named Tambour battant ("Rumbling drum"). Touring Canadian military bases propelled her career across Canada.

During the 1940s, she started producing 78s and she became renowned far beyond Canada. She captured popular imagination with Latin titles like Besame Mucho and Tico tico, after translating herself the Spanish or Brazilian songs into French. She sang in chic New York City cabarets by the mid forties and in 1947, she travelled to England where she made an appearance on the first regular BBC television programme.

== Mental health ==
In 1948, while traveling by car to Hollywood, she was injured in an accident, and entered a period of depression. After a series of unfortunate diagnoses, and a failed romance, she suffered a mental breakdown and was interned for several years in a Quebec City asylum. She was at some point subjected to a lobotomy against her will. She credited the operation with her recovery:

"Je me réveillai guérie et j'ai compris plus tard que j'avais été un des rares cas réussis de lobotomie" (I woke up better and later understood that I was one of the rare lobotomy success stories). In 1952, she was released. The same year, she came back on stage at the Casa Loma and the Montmartre, but her efforts were impeded by taboos about mental problems and she never regained the same level of popularity.

== Later years ==
In the early 1990s, Alys returned into the public eye after the massive success she had with a song written for her by Alain Morisod ("Laissez-moi encore chanter"). Books, theses, plays and television series were written about her. A film was released in December 2004: Alys Robi: Ma vie en cinémascope (litterally "Alys Robi: My Life in Cinemascope"), titled Bittersweet Memories in English.

Robitaille has published two autobiographies: Ma carrière, ma vie ("My Career, My Life", 1980) and Un long cri dans la nuit: Cinq Années à l'Asile ("A Long Cry in the Night: Five Years in the Asylum", 1990). The last autobiography title comes from the song Un long cri dans la nuit, written and composed for Lady Alys by the songwriter Christine Charbonneau in 1989.

Several of Robi's songs have been used for commercial ads. Sico, notably, played on the similarity between its brand name and the title of "Tico Tico" to produce a very catchy campaign based on a spoof of the song.

On September 19, 2008 Alice performed 3 songs for the Desjardins Caisse populaire du Centre-ville de Quebec for their annual general meeting to great acclaim with an audience that knew her well in her hometown.

Robitaille died in the Hôpital Maisonneuve-Rosemont, Montreal, at the age of 88, on May 28, 2011.

== Discography ==
- Diva (2005) (recorded in 1946 at the CBC)
- Laissez-moi encore chanter (1989)

=== Compilations ===
- Alys Robi, Collection QIM (2005)
- Alys Robi, l'anthologie (2004)
- La Collection – volume 1 & 2 (1995)
- La Collection – volume 1 (1995)
- Les Succès d'Alys Robi (1962, 1995)
