= Maskinongé, Quebec =

Maskinongé
- Municipality
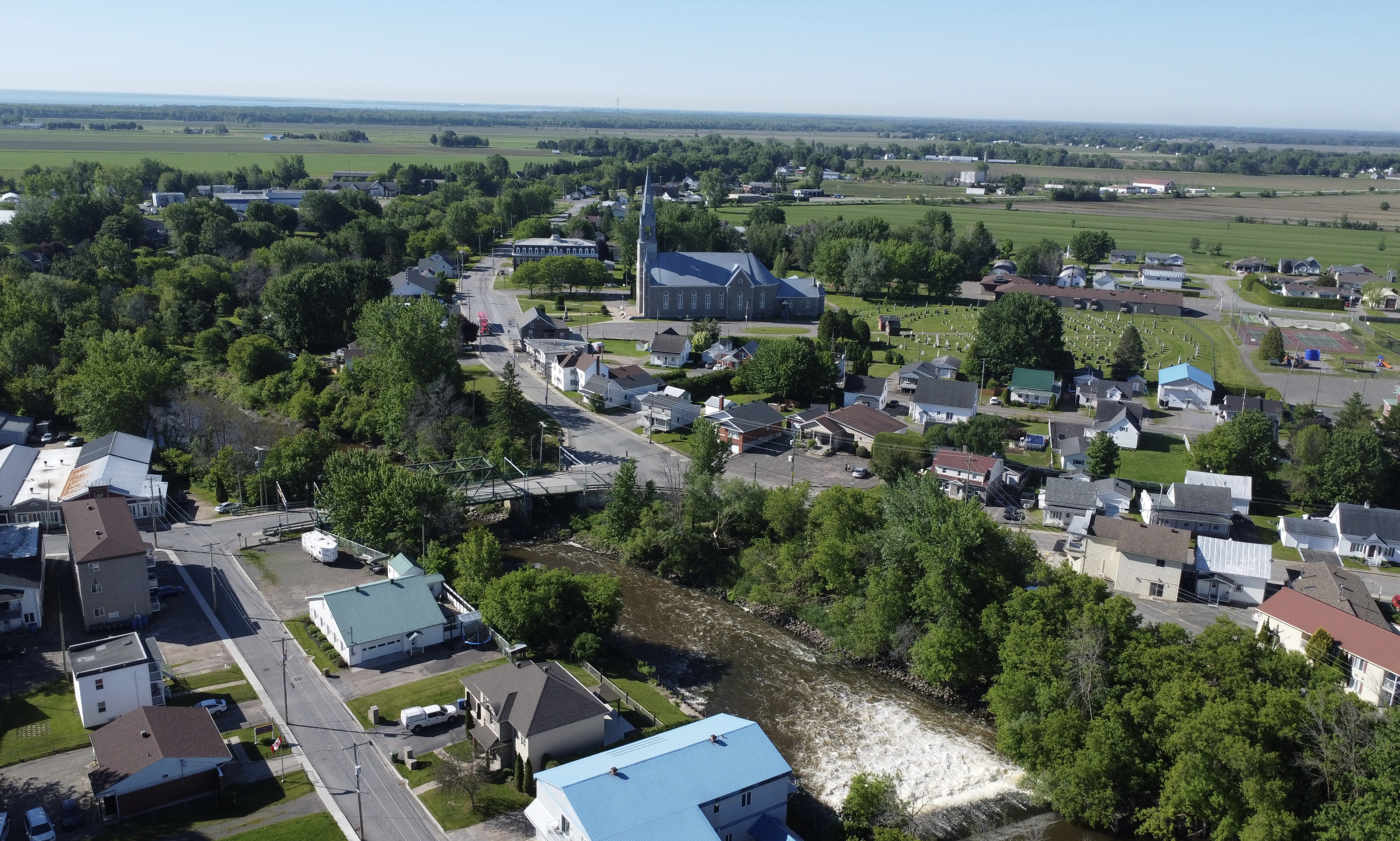

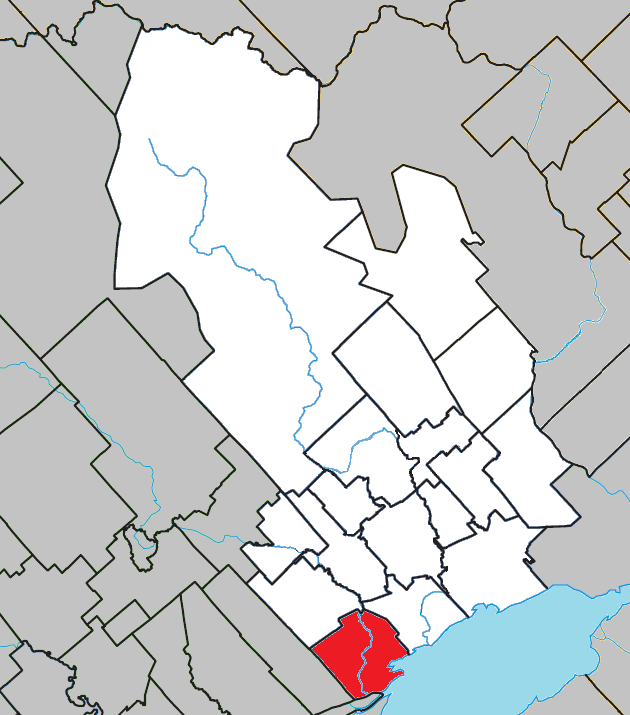
- Location within Maskinongé RCM

- Location in central Quebec
- Coordinates: 46°14′N 73°01′W
- Country: Canada
- Province: Quebec
- Region: Mauricie
- RCM: Maskinongé
- Settled: 1710
- Constituted: April 25, 2001

Government
  - Mayor: Roger Michaud
  - Fed. riding: Berthier—Maskinongé
  - Prov. riding: Maskinongé

Area
  - Total: 74.21 km^{2} (28.65 sq mi)
  - Land: 73.31 km^{2} (28.31 sq mi)
  - Urban: 2.15 km^{2} (0.83 sq mi)

Population (2021)
  - Total: 2,323
  - Density: 31.7/km^{2} (82/sq mi)
  - Urban: 1,409
  - Urban density: 655.9/km^{2} (1,699/sq mi)
  - Change 2016-21: ▲0.2%
  - Dwellings: 1,145
- Time zone: UTC−5 (EST)
  - Summer (DST): UTC−4 (EDT)
- Postal code(s): J0K 1N0
- Area code(s): 819
- Highways A-40: R-138
- Website: www.mun-maskinonge.ca

Maskinongé (French pronunciation: [maskinɔ̃ʒe]) is a municipality in the Mauricie region of the province of Quebec in Canada.

The municipality and its namesake population centre are bisected by the Maskinongé River, which empties there in the St. Lawrence River.

== History ==
In 1672, the area was granted by Jean Talon as a seignory to brothers Pierre-Noël Legardeur de Tilly and Jean-Baptiste Legardeur de Saint-Michel. The seignory was named after the Maskinongé River (spelled Masquinongé at the time), in which muskellunge (Esox masquinongy) is abundant.

Around 1710, the first settlers arrived, building its first church. 4 Years later in 1714, the parish of Saint-Joseph-de-Masquinongé was formed. By 1724, the current spelling "Maskinongé" was in use.

In 1845, the Municipality of Maskinongé was established, abolished 2 years later, and reestablished in 1855. A few years later on March 8, 1859, the municipality lost about half its territory when the Parish Municipality of Saint-Justin was split off.

In 1931, the village itself separated from the municipality and became the Village Municipality of Maskinongé. On March 15, 1969, the Municipality of Maskinongé changed its name and status to become the Parish Municipality of Saint-Joseph-de-Maskinongé.

On April 25, 2001, the Parish Municipality of Saint-Joseph-de-Maskinongé and the Village Municipality of Maskinongé merged to become the current Municipality of Maskinongé.

== Demographics ==
Historical census populations – Maskinongé, Quebec
Year	Pop.	±%
2001	2,208	—
2006	2,233	+1.1%
2011	2,253	+0.9%
2016	2,319	+2.9%
2021	2,323	+0.2%
Source: Statistics Canada

== Notable people ==
- Marie-Anne Gaboury
- Antonin Galipeault
- Joseph Gervais
- Jean-Baptiste Lafrenière
- Said Namouh
