= Gay Village, Montreal =

The Gay Village French: Le Village gai
- Neighbourhood
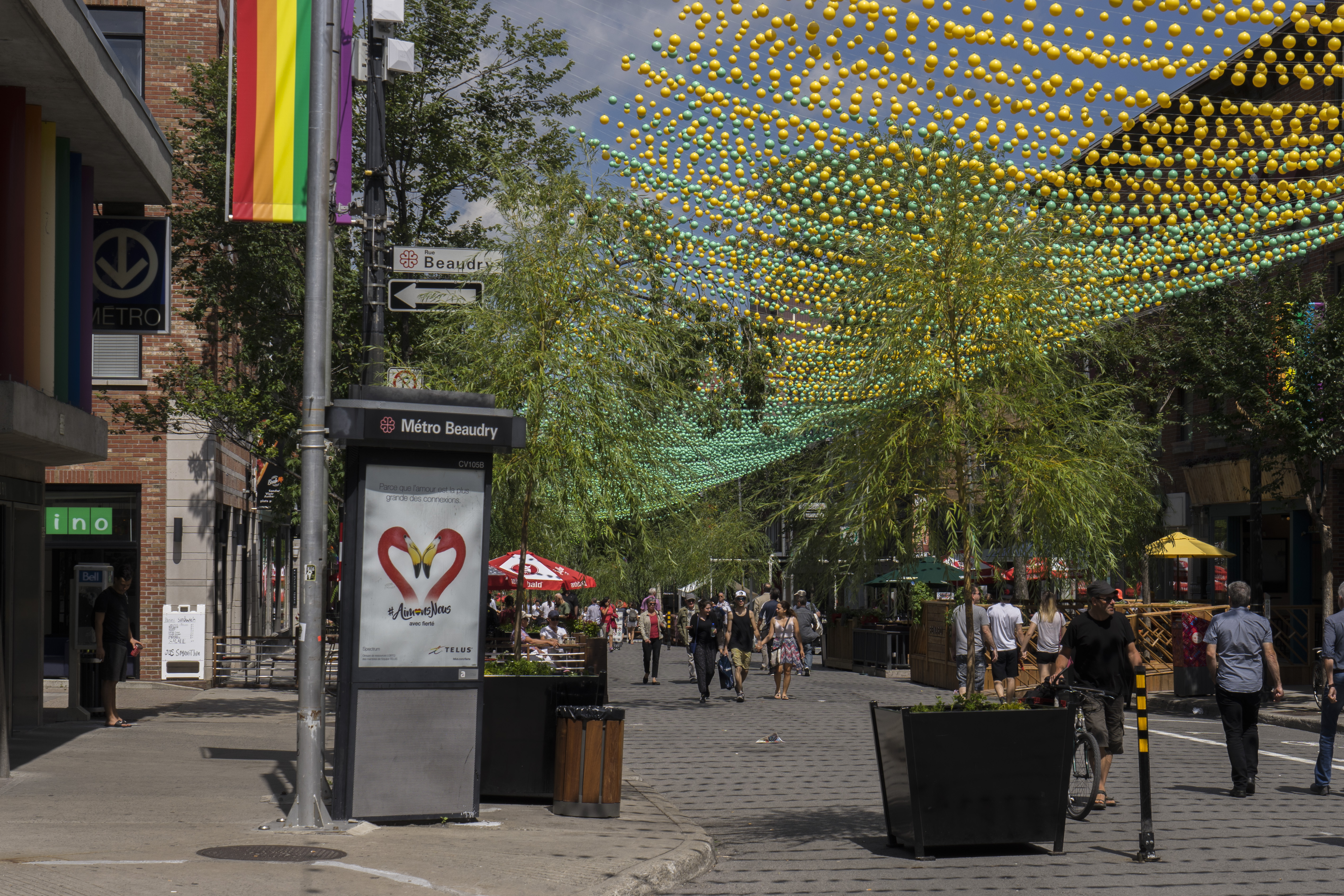
- A partial view of Montreal's Gay Village, with Beaudry Metro station to the left.

- Location of the Gay Village in Montreal
- Coordinates: 45.518825°N 73.555798°W
- Country: Canada
- Province: Quebec
- City: Montreal
- Borough: Ville-Marie
- Postal Code: H2K, H2L
- Area codes: 514, 438

Gay Village (often simply known as "the Village"; French: Le Village gai [lə vilaʒ ɡɛ] or simply Le Village) is a neighbourhood delineated by Saint Catherine Street East and Atateken Street in the Ville-Marie borough of Montreal, Quebec, Canada.

The entire Village is bordered approximately by Saint Hubert Street to the west, De Lorimier Avenue to the east, Sherbrooke Street to the north and René Lévesque Boulevard to the south, making it the largest gay village in North America in terms of area. It is served by the Beaudry and Papineau metro stations.

Originally a poor working-class area, the Centre-Sud neighbourhood became increasingly attractive to the gay and lesbian community after the migration of many LGBTQ businesses from other parts of the city. The area has become considerably gentrified, due in part to significant investment from the various levels of all governments. All three levels of government are aggressively promoting Montreal's gay life as a tourist attraction. In recognition of the Village's importance to the city, the Ville-Marie borough has displayed a rainbow flag in its council chambers and redecorated the entrance to the Beaudry Metro station with rainbow pillars. The Village is specifically marked on official city maps as "Le Village".

== History ==
The first recorded gay establishment in North America was Montrealer Moise Tellier’s apple and cake shop on Craig Street (now Saint Antoine Street) in 1869. In addition to a small scene in Old Montreal, specifically Champs de Mars, there were traditionally two concentrations of establishments where gays were welcomed (by the 1970s, these had become openly gay businesses), which mirrored Montreal's more language-segregated culture. These were Downtown Montreal (mixed, but mostly anglophone) and The Main (mixed, but mostly francophone):

=== Downtown Montreal ===
The west end of Montreal's downtown had bars on Stanley Street and Drummond Street, with Shaughnessy Village west of Guy Street as a gay residential neighbourhood. By the 1950s, Dominion Square (now Dorchester Square) was seen as an area where men could meet and cruise and the centrally located Dominion Square Tavern was known as a place where gays could meet (it still exists today, but has lost its gay clientele). By the late 1960s and early 1970s, many gay-owned or gay-open businesses existed and it became the city's main gay concentration, though it was still relatively marginal and kept discreet. The businesses consisted mainly of clubs where men could dance.

=== The Main ===
The Main, the strip of businesses on Saint-Laurent Boulevard and east along Saint Catherine Street East, an area which was known as the red-light district of sexual services and businesses. The east had a more francophone clientele. Here, the businesses consisted mainly of taverns, often featuring drag shows.

=== Closure of gay businesses in the past ===
The businesses in these two areas came under regular repression, particularly before Montreal's Expo 67 World's Fair and the Olympic Games in 1976. The Aquarius Sauna on Crescent Street was raided in February 1975, followed by six gay and lesbian bars in October 1975, the "Les Bains Clubs" on January 23, 1976 and the Cristal Sauna on February 11, 1976. Because of the increased police repression, the Gay Coalition Against Repression was formed and hosted what was then the largest gay demonstration in Canada on July 19, 1976. In mid-March 1987, the 456 Sauna (formerly the historical Neptune Sauna), the "Taureau d'Or", "Studio 1", "Club Stork", "le Jilly's" and many other businesses were raided and a number of owners had to shut down after dubious accusations that led to a number of owners and clients being arrested.

=== Development of the Gay Village ===
Originally, there were only a handful of establishments located in what is now the Gay Village. In the early 1980s, some bars opened along Saint-Catherine Street East, between Berri Street and Papineau Avenue, in Montreal's Centre-Sud area. In 1984 Bernard Rousseau opened the Cinéma du Village on Saint-Catherine Street, one of the first gay establishments. The cinema was an important community place, and because of the financial troubles, showed various movies from arthouse to pornography, before closing in 1992.

Eventually, a new generation of gays also moved into the neighbourhood, both anglophone and francophone, including many came from other parts of Quebec. This was encouraged by the creation of a "Latin Quarter" in the vicinity of the Université du Québec à Montréal campus.

The name Le Village de l'Est ('the East Village') was coined in an advertisement by one of the owners of K.O.X., a very popular bar/club at the time. After having lived in New York City, it was his intention to create a strong vibrant gay community similar to the East Village in Manhattan. The name was created to differentiate itself from the traditional downtown scene. Eventually, the name became known simply as The Village and it became Montreal's main gay residential and commercial district. However, its success also caused the near-disappearance of gay businesses from other areas of the city.

By the 1990s, the Village began expanding along Amherst (now Atateken) Street, with the departure of many antique shops and the emergence of more gay-owned and gay-operated businesses. By this time, the Village had become well established, gaining political recognition and acceptance by the LGBT community as well as by heterosexuals. By gaining popularity, the area has generally thrived, having been beautified and having housing renovated. Almost all gay businesses in Montreal are now located in this area.

Librairie L'Androgyne, the city's main LGBT-oriented bookstore, moved to the village in 2001, from its prior location on Saint-Laurent, but closed in 2002 due to declining sales.

Although many LGBTQ individuals reside and are very present in other parts of Montreal, the Gay Village remains the heart of Montreal's LGBT community. Every summer, St. Catherine Street becomes a pedestrian mall that is decked out with many pink balls strung overhead. Many bars and restaurants provide outdoor terraces for their patrons at this time. Major events that are held in the Village include Fierté Montréal (Montreal's Pride festival) and Le Festival International de Montréal en Arts.

=== Lesbian communities and the development of the Gay Village ===
Throughout the second half of the twentieth century, lesbian communities in Montreal established social and cultural spaces outside the area that later became known as the Gay Village. Between the 1950s and 1970s, these spaces gave lesbian women places to socialize, build community, and express their identities safely at a time when they faced discrimination and social repression. Working-class lesbian women's experiences of public and social spaces were shaped by both gender and social class. According to sociologist Line Chamberland, lesbian bars between 1955 and 1975 helped develop lesbian communities in Montreal before the Gay Village was established.

During the 1970s and 1980s, a growing number of lesbian women in Montreal became involved in political activism and public demonstrations. Through this activity, they created opportunities for social connection, political participation, and visibility, and contributed to the development of the city's broader LGBTQ movement. In 1974, lesbian women boycotted Chez Madame Arthur, a lesbian bar on Bishop Street, following concerns about harassment and the treatment of lesbian patrons. It was the city's first lesbian public demonstration. The boycott challenged gender-based inequalities within lesbian social spaces and asserted greater control over the establishments women frequented. Lesbian activists also took part in protests against police repression surrounding the 1976 Summer Olympics, in Montreal's first gay pride march in 1979, and in an International Women's Day demonstration in 1983. Julie A. Podmore and Line Chamberland examine four examples of lesbian activism during this period, outside the development of the predominantly gay male Village, in which women used public demonstrations to assert their identities, increase their visibility, and claim greater access to urban spaces. These activities contributed to lesbian political visibility independently of the commercial development of the Gay Village and show the role lesbian women played in shaping Montreal's LGBTQ communities and public spaces.

The Gay Village developed during the 1980s and 1990s alongside differences in how lesbian women and gay men established and occupied urban space. Sociologist Colin Giraud describes the Village as having developed in the 1980s as a refuge for gay individuals facing discrimination and social exclusion, before becoming a more visible and socially recognized LGBTQ neighbourhood in the 1990s. While gay men's commercial establishments became increasingly concentrated in the Gay Village, lesbian communities developed a separate network of bars, cafés, and community organizations in the Plateau-Mont-Royal neighbourhood, particularly around Saint-Denis Street. During the 1980s, this area became a hub for lesbian social and cultural life, offering opportunities for community organization, social interaction, and political participation. According to Podmore, these distinct geographical patterns reflected differences in the organization and visibility of lesbian and gay male communities, and gender and sexuality shaped access to social spaces, community organization, and public visibility. Her study of lesbian social spaces between 1950 and 2001 examines community building, visibility, and lesbian women's evolving relationship with the Gay Village. Montreal's LGBTQ communities therefore developed beyond the Village's geographical boundaries.

During the 1990s, the Gay Village expanded from a space largely populated by gay men into an increasingly important hub for lesbian nightlife and social interaction. Changes in lesbian nightlife during this period created new opportunities for social interaction, community participation, and expressions of lesbian identity within the Village. Podmore argues that gay villages did not function exclusively as spaces for gay men that marginalized lesbian women, but also provided opportunities for new expressions of lesbian identity and participation in LGBTQ nightlife. These developments reflect how the relationship between lesbian communities and the Gay Village changed over time, in step with broader transformations in Montreal's LGBTQ social and cultural spaces.

=== Bibliography ===
- Chamberland, Line (1993). "Remembering Lesbian Bars: Montreal, 1955–1975". Journal of Homosexuality. 25 (3): 231–270. doi:10.1300/J082v25n03_02.
- Giraud, Colin (2013). "Montreal's 'Gay Village': A Minority Urban Adventure". Espaces et sociétés (154): 33–48. doi:10.3917/esp.154.0033.
- Podmore, Julie A. (2006). "Gone 'Underground'? Lesbian Visibility and the Consolidation of Queer Space in Montréal". Social & Cultural Geography. 7 (4): 595–625. doi:10.1080/14649360600825737.
- Podmore, Julie A. (2013). "Lesbians as Village 'Queers': The Transformation of Montréal's Lesbian Nightlife in the 1990s". ACME: An International Journal for Critical Geographies. 12 (2): 220–249. doi:10.14288/acme.v12i2.961.
- Podmore, Julie A.; Chamberland, Line (2015). "Entering the Urban Frame: Early Lesbian Activism and Public Space in Montréal". Journal of Lesbian Studies. 19 (2): 192–211. doi:10.1080/10894160.2015.970473.

== See also ==
- List of gay villages
  - Church and Wellesley, Toronto's gay village
  - Davie Village, Vancouver's gay village
- Montreal Pride
- Divers/Cité, Montreal's former Pride event (1993 to 2014)
- 2006 World Outgames
- Le Stud
