= Stanley Street (Montreal) =

Street in Montreal, Canada

- Native name: rue Stanley (French)
- Length: 1 km (0.62 mi)
- Location: Between Doctor Penfield Avenue and Canadiens-de-Montréal Avenue
- Coordinates: 45.49967°N 73.574308°W

Construction
- Inauguration: 1845

Stanley Street (officially in French: rue Stanley) is a north–south street located in downtown Montreal, Quebec, Canada. It links Doctor Penfield Avenue in the north and De la Gauchetière Street in the south.

== History ==
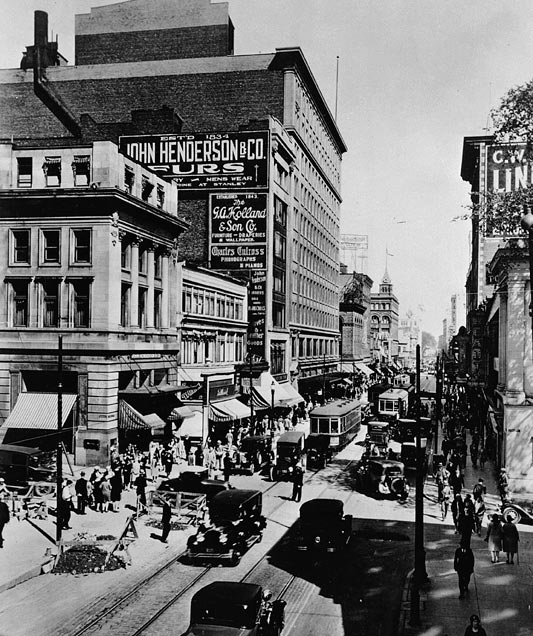
The intersection of Stanley Street and Saint Catherine Street in 1930.

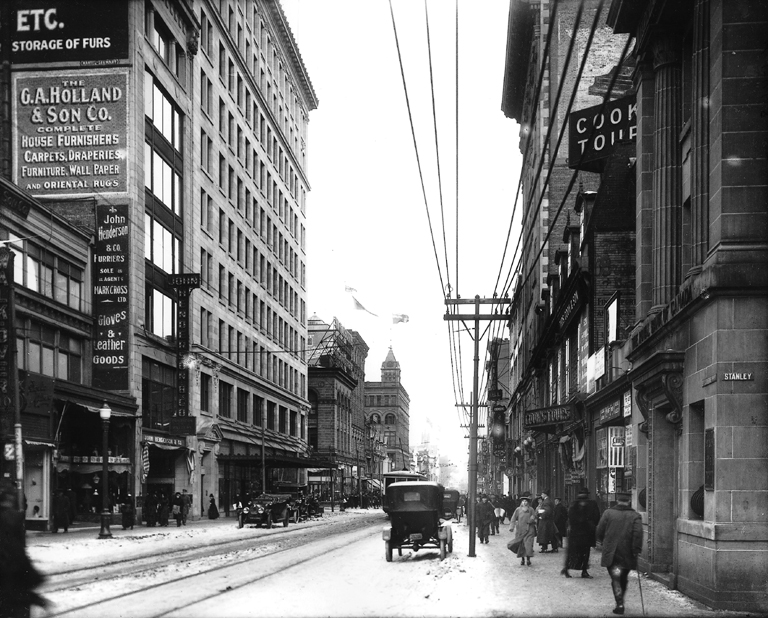
Corner of St Catherine and Stanley Streets looking east (1915)

Stanley Street opened in 1845, and was named for Edward Smith-Stanley, 14th Earl of Derby (1799–1869), the Secretary of State for War and the Colonies at the time (and later Prime Minister of the United Kingdom). The name was chosen by James Smith and Duncan Fisher, and was designated on August 23, 1845.

Frederick Stanley, 16th Earl of Derby, second son of Edward Smith-Stanley, 14th Earl of Derby, and later Lord Stanley of Preston, was the 6th Governor General of Canada, in office from June 11, 1888 – September 18, 1893.

Molson's Bank was located on the street and at one time employed Joachim von Ribbentrop.

From the 1970s, the street had been the centre of Montreal's gay village. Open since 1974 and still operating from its basement location on Stanley Street until its closing in 2009, the gay bar Le Mystique was raided by police in 1976, leading to riots. Starting in the early 1980s, Montreal's gay village relocated further east.
