= Rose Ouellette =

Canadian actress and comedian

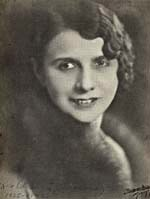
- Ouellette, c. 1925
- Born: Rose-Alma Ouellette; August 25, 1903; Faubourg à m'lasse, Montreal, Quebec, Canada
- Died: September 14, 1996 (aged 93); Montreal, Quebec, Canada
- Occupations: Actress, comedian
- Years active: 1919–1990

Rose-Alma Ouellette OQ, (August 25, 1903 – September 14, 1996) also known by her stage name La Poune was a Quebec actress, comedian, theatre manager and artistic director. Ouellette was born to François Ouellette and Josephine Lasanté in the faubourg à M’lasse, a working-class neighbourhood in Montréal, Quebec. In her teens, she dropped out of school and worked at a shoe factory in order to provide income for her large family. In the later part of her career, she appeared in film and on television, but she is most remembered for her work on stage. She is known as the first woman ever to have directed two individual playhouses in North America.

== Career ==
Ouellette began her career at the age of 12, when she won several local singing and theater contests. At age 19, she was noticed after performing at the Ouimetoscope and Lune rousse theatres in Montréal. She formed a duo with Olivier Guimond (père), which quickly became popular throughout Québec. Ouellette called herself "Casserole" at first, but eventually took the stage name "La Poune" in order to complement Guimond's own stage name, "Ti-Zoune."

Ouellette was a leading figure of the very popular burlesque and vaudeville genres which dominated the theatrical scene in Montreal from the 1920s until the 1960s. From 1936 to 1953, Ouellette was in charge of the Théâtre National. In 1958 she launched a career in cabaret that lasted more than 20 years. In the late 60s and early 70s, she worked with Gilles Latulippe at the Théâtre des Variétés of Montreal. Between 1971 and 1980, she played opposite Juliette Pétrie, Gerry Morelle, Simone Mercier, Gaston Boileau and Louis Armel. In 1982, she appeared as madame Jeanne Renoir in Scandale; she has also made various television appearances. Her 75-year career eventually made her a cultural icon in Quebec.

=== Television roles ===
She made her television debut in "Les Deux Valses," a play by André Laurendeau presented by the SRC in 1960. Later in 1960 she appeared in the comedy series "Télé-surprise" (CFTM). She played occasional roles in the TV soap operas "Rue des pignons" (SRC, 1966–1977), "Chère Isabelle" (TVA, 1976–1977), "Les Brillant" (TVA, 1979–1982) and "Les Moineau et les Pinson" (TVA, 1982–1985).

=== Awards ===
In 1985, Rose Ouellette was awarded the Rose d'or, a prize given by popular vote. In 1990, she was the recipient of the Ordre national du Québec.

=== Publications ===
Journalist Philippe Laframboise collected some biographical remarks, which were published in La Poune (Éditions Héritage, 1978. 139 pages). Oulette published several works including Vous faire rire, c'est ma vie (1983) and Comment atteindre le bel âge en grande forme (1985).

== Death ==
Ouellette died on September 14, 1996, at Hôpital Maisonneuve-Rosemont in Montreal, Quebec at the age of 93.
