= Olivier Guimond (père) =

Canadian comedian (1893–1954)

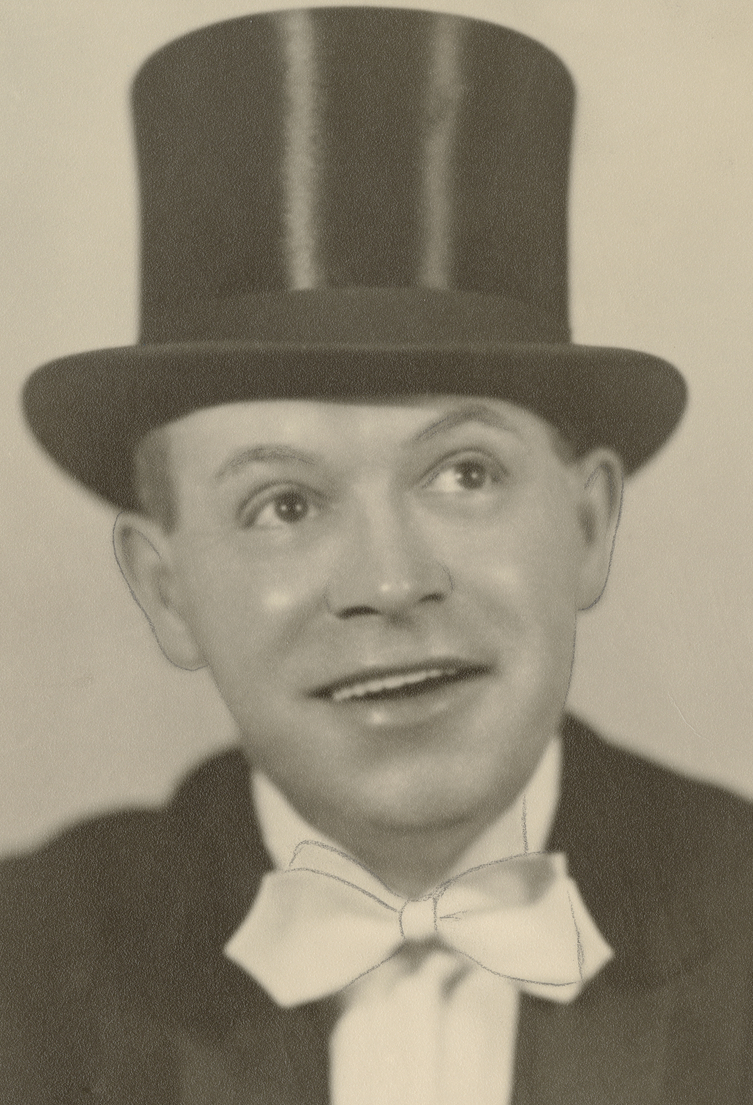
- Guimond in 1940
- Born: March 18, 1893; Sudbury, Ontario, Canada
- Died: October 9, 1954 (aged 61); Montreal, Quebec, Canada
- Resting place: Notre Dame des Neiges Cemetery, Montreal
- Other names: Ti-Zoune
- Occupations: Comedian, humorist, actor
- Style: Burlesque
- Spouse: Euphemia-Mary McDonald (m. 1913)
- Children: Olivier Guimond (fils)

Olivier Guimond (père) (born March 18, 1893, in Sudbury, Ontario, died October 9, 1954, in Montreal, Quebec) was a Canadian comedian, humorist, and burlesque revue leader who was very famous in Quebec between the mid-1910s and the late 1940s. He was the father of comedian Olivier Guimond (fils) and the grandfather of dubbing actor Richard Darbois.

== Biography ==
=== Early years ===
He started his career at a very young age, in English. He played in a duet with Nosey Black, a New York vaudeville performer. But this early career did not support him and he had to work at other jobs such as a shoeshine boy at the Ottawa train station.

It was there that Arthur Petrie, who became Juliette Petrie's husband, discovered Olivier Guimond while on tour in Ontario around 1912. While waiting to catch a train at the Ottawa Station, he stopped to shine his shoes. The young man shining his shoes was Olivier Guimond and he kept singing and dancing while doing his job. Arthur Petrie offered him a better salary and Olivier followed him for the rest of the tour. From his first appearance, he was so successful that Arthur Petrie gave him a bigger role and quickly gave him the stage name of "Ti-zoune" that another comic, who had already left the theater, had held before him. The first "Ti-zoune" was Pierre Desrosiers, the father of Jacques Desrosiers. The nickname is sometimes spelled "Tizoune" without the hyphen, but the most commonly observed form remains "Ti-zoune".

In a few weeks, he became one of the stars of Arthur Petrie's troupe. There he met Effie MacDonald, a dancer, whom he married in 1913. Olivier Guimond (fils) was born of this union in 1914.

=== Burlesque troupe leader ===
In the late 1910s, he co-directed a successful burlesque troupe with Arthur Petrie. However, a dispute led Guimond to create his own troupe. The separation between the two partners was difficult.

Their son (Olivier Guimond Jr.) accompanied them on their tours until the age of seven (1921); they then sent him to boarding school at Mont-Saint-Louis in Ahunstic, Montreal.

Initially (in the late 1910s and early 1920s), no doubt influenced by the context of the time, his Franco-Ontarian childhood, and the influence of American burlesque, Ti-zoune performed in English in Montreal even though his audience was mostly French-speaking. He made the transition to French gradually from the mid-1920s and participated in the creation of a French-language burlesque repertoire. He was thus following in the footsteps of his former associate Arthur Petrie, who had begun presenting burlesque shows in French in the late 1910s.

In 1922, Guimond, now nicknamed "Ti-zoune" by everyone, formed his own troupe and toured for several years. Several stars participated in the shows and tours of his troupe, including Rose Ouellette, known as La Poune, Manda Parent, Paul Desmarteaux, and the wife of Olivier Guimond Sr., dancer Effie MacDonald.

=== Legacy ===
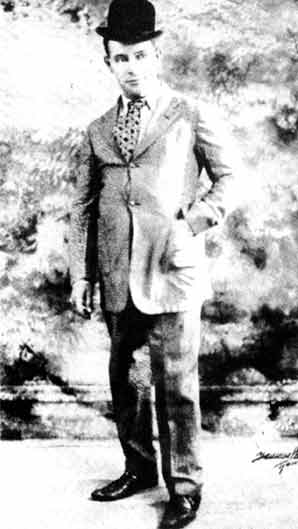

Burlesque — a genre composed mainly of humorous monologues and improvised sketches in which stripping is excluded — dominated the Montreal stage from the 1920s to the 1950s before television eclipsed it. Initially performed in English and heavily influenced by American vaudeville, burlesque in Quebec owes its remarkable success in French almost exclusively to three performers who all led numerous French-language burlesque troupes: Arthur Petrie (husband of Juliette Petrie), Olivier Guimond Sr., the most popular comic of the time, and a little later, Rose Ouellette ("La Poune"), who learned her art from Guimond and remained the queen of burlesque until the disappearance of theatrical practice. Indeed, in the early 1920s, Olivier Guimond had a major influence on Rose Ouellette's career, even going so far as to give her her stage name, "La Poune".

According to Juliette Petrie and Jean Grimaldi, Olivier Guimond Sr. was and remains the greatest comic in the history of Canadian burlesque.

=== Death ===
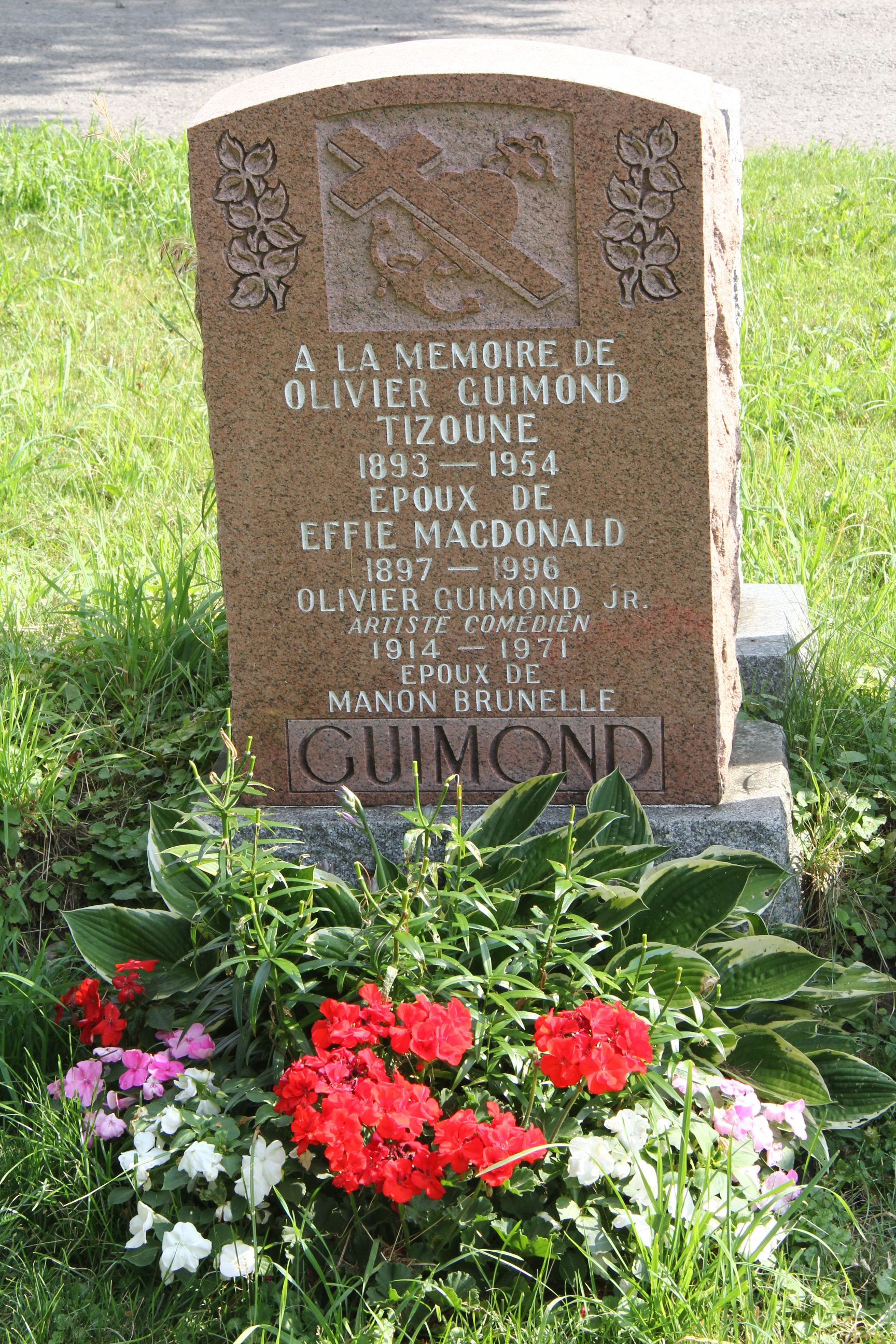
Olivier 'Tizoune' Guimond (1893–1954) and his son's (1914–1971) tombstone, Notre Dame des Neiges Cemetery, Montreal

Guimond died of cancer in Montreal on October 9, 1954, at the age of 61, at the Royal Victoria Hospital, after a year of illness. He is buried at Notre Dame des Neiges Cemetery in Montreal.

== Bibliography ==
- Cimon, Jacques; Laframboise, Philippe (1973). Jean Grimaldi présente. Montreal: René Ferron.
- Petrie, Juliette (1977). Quand on revoit tout ça! : [Le burlesque au Québec, 1914–1960]. Jean Leclerc. [Montréal]: [Productions Vieux rêves]. ISBN 0-88604-006-X. OCLC 6144424.
- Laframboise, Philippe (1978). La Poune. Montréal: Éditions Héritage. ISBN 0-7773-3813-0. OCLC 4982771.
- Hébert, Chantal (1981). Le burlesque au Québec : un divertissement populaire. [Ville LaSalle]: Hurtubise HMH. ISBN 2-89045-507-6. OCLC 8785371.
- Hébert, Chantal (1989). Le burlesque québécois et américain : textes inédits. Québec: Presses de l'Université Laval. ISBN 2-7637-7187-4. OCLC 27433538.
- Guimond, Luc (1997). Olivier Guimond, mon pere, mon heros. Montreal: Edimag. ISBN 9782921735377. OCLC 1150949927.
- Dictionnaire des artistes du théâtre québécois. Cahiers de théâtre Jeu. Montréal. 2008. ISBN 978-2-7644-2156-7. OCLC 857904937.
