= Le Stud =

Gay bar in Montreal, Canada

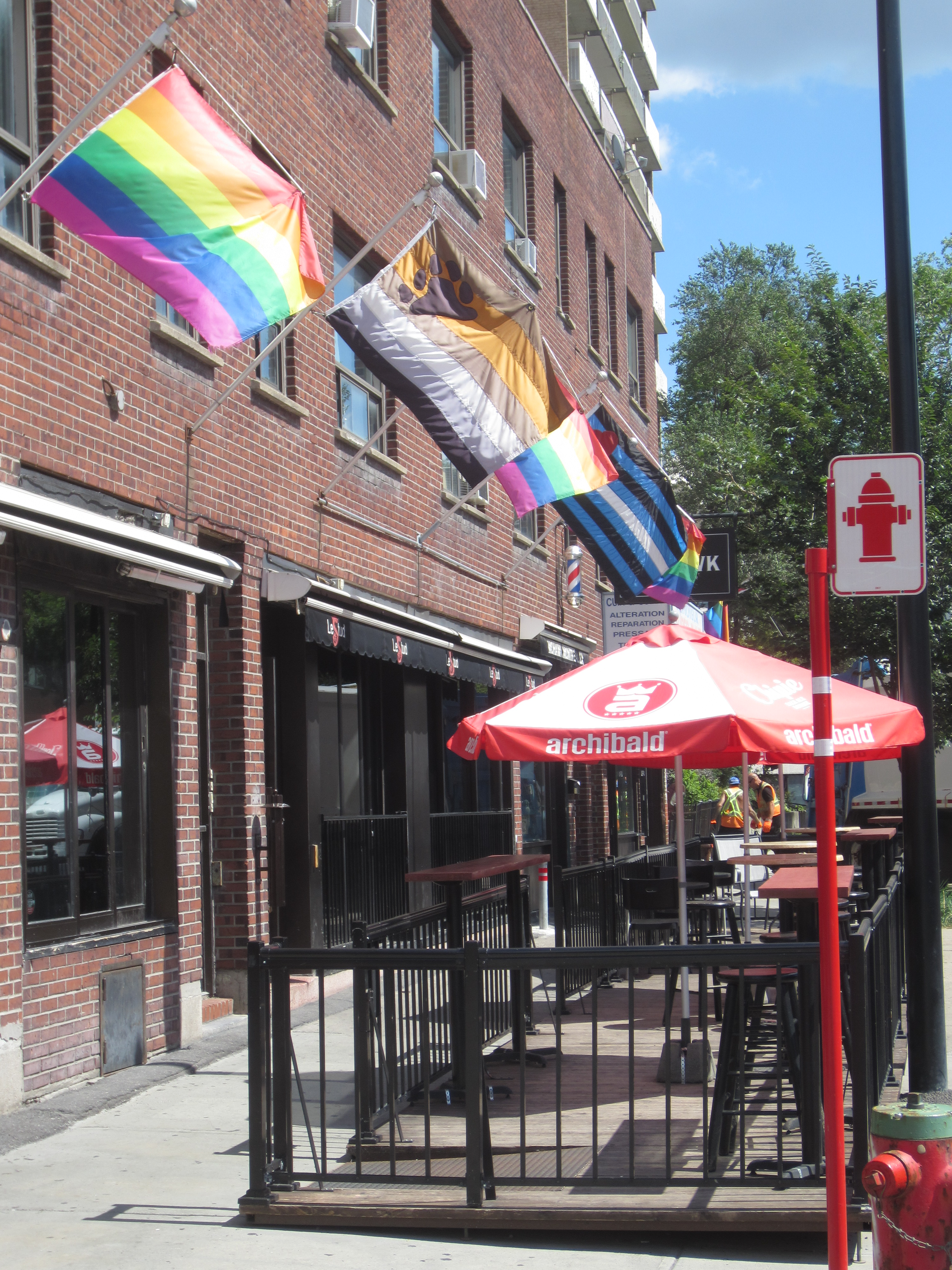
- The bar's exterior, 2017

- Location within Montreal
- Location: Gay Village, Montreal, Quebec, Canada
- Coordinates: 45°31′21″N 73°33′7″W

Construction
- Opened: 1996

Le Stud, or Bar Le Stud, is a gay bar in Montreal's Gay Village, in Quebec, Canada. Established in 1996, the bar caters to bears and the leather subculture. The business has since been criticized for not allowing women in the past, but no longer has such a policy following a discrimination complaint that was filed in 2007.

== History ==
Le Stud opened in 1996.

In 2007, Audrey Vachon filed a complaint with the Human Rights Tribunal of Quebec. According to the bar's owner, Michel Gadoury, women have not been allowed since the bar's establishment in order to provide masculine environment to its clientele. Vachon's discrimination complaint was settled in 2008. The terms were not disclosed, but the commission concluded that "businesses have the right to attract a particular clientele but not to discriminate by excluding other customers".

== See also ==
- List of LGBTQ bars
