= Said Namouh =

Moroccan jihadist

Said Namouh is a Moroccan-Canadian jihadist. He emigrated to Canada in 2003 and settled in Maskinongé, Quebec. A divorced man, Namouh worked on the Khidemat web forum under the name "Ashraf" and is alleged to have edited videos for the Global Islamic Media Front.

In 2009, he was convicted under the Canadian Anti-Terrorism Act of distributing "jihadist" propaganda online and sentenced to life imprisonment.

== 2007 arrest ==
Two days after his arrest, Canada stated that they would not extradite him to Austria, where two men and a woman were also arrested. He was accused of making the images "widely available on the internet", and helping publicise a threat against Austria and Germany that threatened to detonate a car bomb unless the countries withdrew their troops from Afghanistan.

His defence lawyer, Rene Duval, argued there was a slippery slope between disseminating religious materials and "propaganda".
