= Docteur-Penfield Avenue =

Thoroughfare in Montreal, Canada

Coordinates: 45.5003°N 73.5831°W

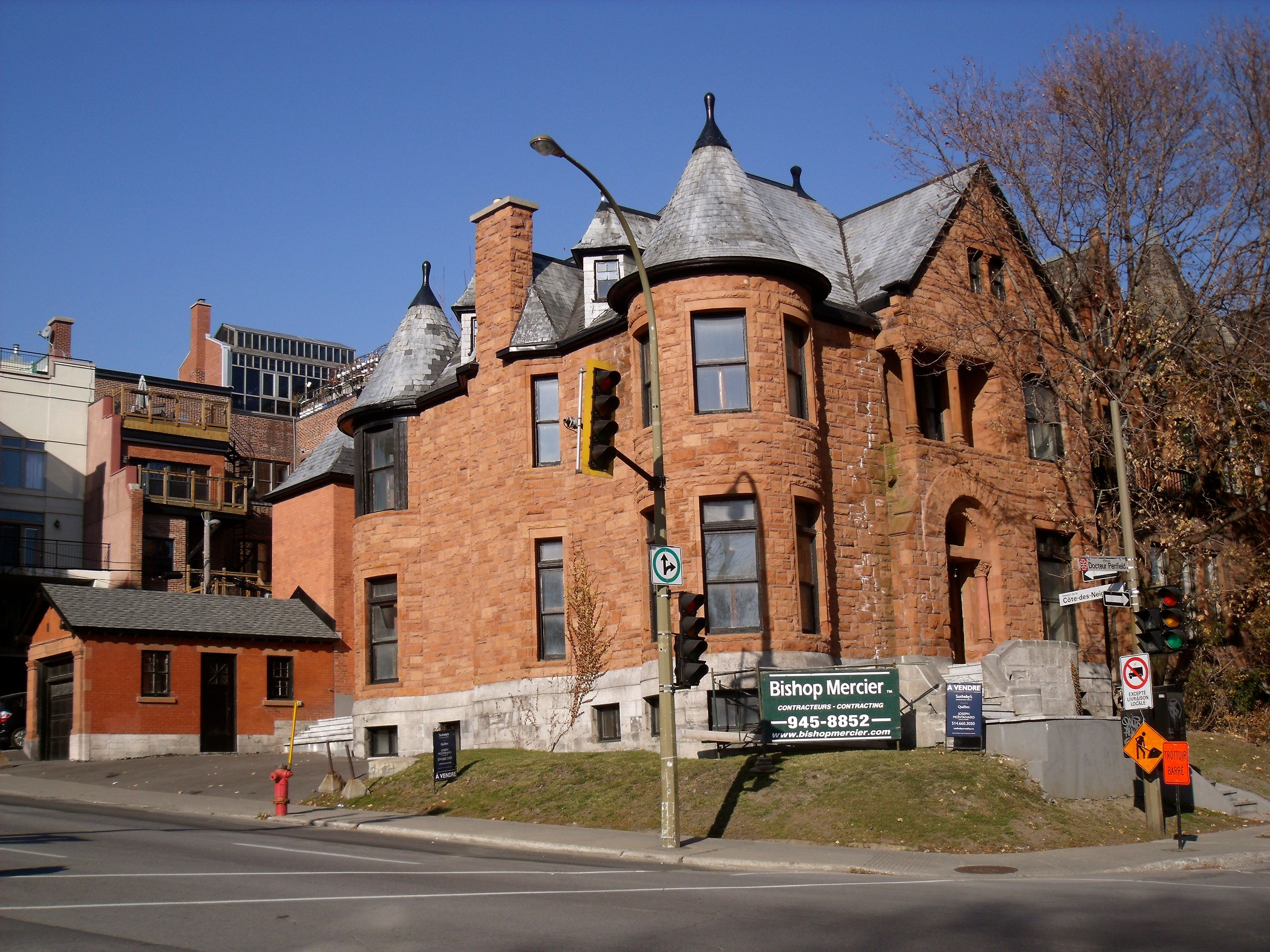
1595 Doctor Penfield Avenue

Doctor Penfield Avenue (officially in French: Avenue du Docteur-Penfield) is a one-way eastbound street located in the Golden Square Mile neighbourhood of the borough of Ville-Marie in Montreal, Quebec, Canada. Spanning 1.7 kilometres, it begins at Pine Avenue in the east and terminates at McDougall Avenue, to the west. Doctor Penfield Avenue is named after Wilder Penfield (1891–1976), the founder of the Montreal Neurological Institute.

Located on the southern flank of Mount Royal, it passes through the heart of McGill University's campus, and features opulent Victorian homes, many now serving as foreign consulates.

== History ==
Despite being named for Penfield in 1978, the street itself is much older. The street opened on the property of John McGregor around 1867. Upon selling the land in 1883, the street was named after McGregor. Originally it connected Côte-des-Neiges Road and Simpson Street, but was lengthened on December 6, 1956.
