= Richard Darbois =

Canadian voice actor (born 1951)

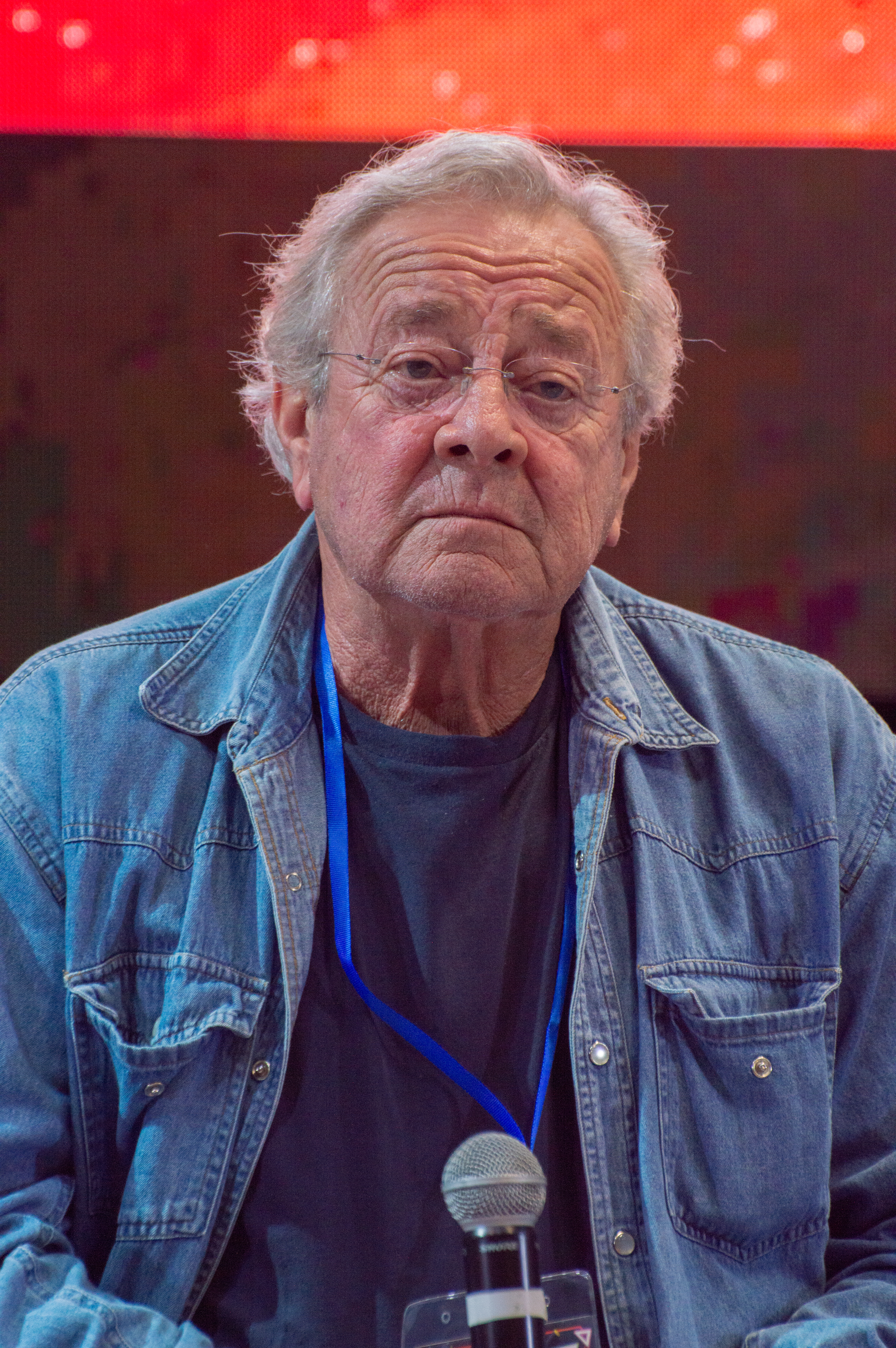
- Richard Darbois in 2023.
- Born: Richard Guimond; 7 December 1951 (age 74); Montreal, Quebec, Canada
- Occupation: Actor
- Years active: 1963–present

Richard Guimond (French pronunciation: [ʁiʃaʁ ɡimɔ̃]; born 7 December 1951), professionally known as Richard Darbois (pronounced [ʁiʃaʁ daʁbwa]), is a Canadian actor who specializes in French dubbing.

Darbois is a regular French voice for many actors, including Harrison Ford, Danny Glover, Richard Gere, Jeff Goldblum, Dan Aykroyd, and Patrick Swayze, as well as for Bill Murray, Arnold Schwarzenegger and Sylvester Stallone.

Darbois is also very present in the animation industry, standing out singularly by his playing and various vocal possibilities. He has participated in many works for Disney Studios, notably lending his voice to Buzz Lightyear in the Toy Story franchise and the series Buzz Lightyear of Star Command, Genie in Aladdin, Oogie Boogie in The Nightmare Before Christmas, Shan-Yu in Mulan, Bruce in Finding Nemo, Mr. Waternoose in Monsters, Inc.. He also lent his voice to Batman in several series and animated films of the 1990s (including Batman: The Animated Series) and Captain Harlock in the anime series Space Pirate Captain Harlock.

In the media, he is also known as the voice-over artist of the radio station NRJ and some brands for advertising. His prominence among voice actors of the era is such that he was once referred to as the "God-Emperor of French dubbing".

== Early life ==
Richard Darbois is the son of comedian Olivier Guimond and singer Jeanne-d'Arc Charlebois.

In 1955, his parents separated and his mother left for a career in Europe, accompanied by her children, where she took the artist name of Jeanne Darbois, a surname that her children would adopt.

== Career ==
In the 1970s, at the start of his acting career, Richard Darbois appeared in several soft erotic films, then in pornographic films; however, he was dubbed in the latter for the hard shots. He then turned to dubbing, where he professionalized. Within the post-synchronization, Richard Darbois is distinguished by a very recognizable voice, of which he is able to modify the bass as well as the treble (though his normal voice is still very deep, even cavernous).

Darbois has since been in many French versions for films and television series through animation. He doubles Harrison Ford, Richard Gere, Danny Glover and Jeff Goldblum and has repeatedly dubbed Bill Murray, Patrick Swayze, Arnold Schwarzenegger, Liam Neeson, George Clooney and even Sylvester Stallone (during a certain period, Alain Dorval, the usual voice of Stallone, was at odds with the studios, following union demands).

He also modulates his voice according to the actors he doubles; he retains his normal voice for Harrison Ford (who also has a very deep voice), while giving a much less serious voice to Richard Gere and Jeff Goldblum and even less serious to Bill Murray. Danny Glover, on the other hand, has the same voice as Harrison Ford, but with a slight black African-American accent. Darbois also kept his normal voice for Richard Chamberlain, Arnold Schwarzenegger, Michael Ironside and Keith Richards, who played Edward Teague in Pirates of the Caribbean: At World's End. He explained that "To do a good dubbing, you must observe the original, not only the voice but the face and body. I like to believe I am an excellent forger."

Darbois currently lives in Guadeloupe with his wife, with whom he has a son. However, he continues to record announcements for NRJ Radio, and the firm has set up a studio for him there.

== Filmography ==
=== Dubbing roles ===
==== Cinema ====
- Harrison Ford
  - Blade Runner (1982) (Rick Deckard)
  - Indiana Jones and the Last Crusade (1989) (Indiana Jones)
  - Patriot Games (1992) (Jack Ryan)
  - Clear and Present Danger (1994) (Jack Ryan)
  - Air Force One (1997) (President James Marshall)
  - K-19: The Widowmaker (2002) (Captain Alexis Vostrikov)
- Sneakers (Mother)
- Pearl Harbor (Captain Thurman)
- 50 First Dates (Doctor Keats)
- Casper (Doctor Raymond Stantz)
- Ghostbusters (Doctor Raymond Stantz)
- Ghostbusters II (Doctor Raymond Stantz)
- Blues Brothers 2000 (Elwood Blues)
- Unconditional Love (Max Beasley)
- My Stepmother Is an Alien (Steven Mills)
- Gremlins (Deputy Brent, Mister Jones)
- Flubber (Chester Hoenicker)
- The Substitute (Jonathan Shale)
- Starman (Starman)
- Highlander (The Kurgan)
- Blue Steel (Nick Mann)
- Alien 3 (Aaron)
- RoboCop 3 (RoboCop)
- Ghost (Sam Wheat)
- Spaceballs (Barf)
- Man of the House (Jack)
- One Fine Day (Jack)
- From Dusk till Dawn (Seth Gecko)
- Taps (Cadet Captain David Shawn)
- Wishmaster series (Djinn)
- Platoon (Captain Harris)
- What Lies Beneath (Doctor Norman Spencer)
- The Fugitive (Doctor Richard Kimble)
- Random Hearts (Sergeant William 'Dutch' Van Den Broeck)
- Hollywood Homicide (Joe Gavilan)
- Witness (John Book)
- Sabrina (Linus Larrabee)
- Presumed Innocent (Rusty Sabich)
- The Devil's Own (Tom O'Meara)
- No Mercy (Eddie Jillette)
- Chicago (Billy Flynn)
- The Jackal (Declan Mulqueen)
- Pretty Woman (Edward Lewis)
- Unfaithful (Edward "Ed" Sumner)
- Runaway Bride (Homer Eisenhower "Ike" Graham)
- Final Analysis (Doctor Isaac Barr)
- Red Corner (Jack Moore)
- The Mothman Prophecies (John Klein)
- Dr. T & the Women (Doctor T)
- Intersection (Vincent Eastman)
- Autumn in New York (Will Keane)
- The Color Purple (Mister)
- Bat*21 (Captain Bartholomew Clark)
- Lethal Weapon series (Sergeant Roger Murtaugh)
- Beloved (Paul D.)
- The Money Pit (Max Beissart)
- Jurassic Park (Doctor Ian Malcolm)
- The Lost World: Jurassic Park (Doctor Ian Malcolm)
- Cats & Dogs (Professor Brody)
- Holy Man (Ricky Hayman)
- The Fly (Seth Brundle)
- Silverado ('Slick' Calvin Stanhope)
- Scooby-Doo (N' Goo Tuana)
- Doctor Welker (Dr Paul Welker)
- The Right Stuff (John Glenn)
- Betrayed (Michael Carnes)
- After Hours (Thomas 'Tom' Schorr)
- Police Academy (Kyle Blankes)
- Hero (Bernard "Bernie" LaPlante)
- Hook (Hook)
- I Love You to Death (Harlan James)
- Total Recall (Richter)
- Blown Away (Ryan Gaerity)
- Willow (Madmartigan)
- Blind Date (David Bedford)
- The Silence of the Lambs (Buffalo Bill)
- Ransom (Agent Lonnie Hawkins)
- Gone in 60 Seconds (Detective Roland Castlebeck)
- Masters of the Universe (He-Man)
- Wild Things (Kenneth Bowden)
- Space Jam (Bill Murray)
- Rushmore (Herman J. Blume)
- Groundhog Day (Phil Connors)
- Three Fugitives (Dan Lucas)
- Beetlejuice (Otho)

=== Animation ===
Film
Year	Title	Role	Notes
1946	Make Mine Music	Narrator	
1947	Fun and Fancy Free	Willie the Giant	
1971	Bedknobs and Broomsticks	King Leonidas	
1987	The Chipmunk Adventure	Klaus Vorstein	
1989	All Dogs Go to Heaven	Charlie B. Barkin	
1992	Aladdin	The Genie	
1993	The Nightmare Before Christmas	Oogie Boogie	
1993	Batman: Mask of the Phantasm	Batman (Bruce Wayne)	
1994	Thumbelina	Mr. Bear	
1994	Aladdin and The Return of Jafar	The Genie	
1994	The Pagemaster	Captain Ahab	
1995	Toy Story	Buzz Lightyear	
1996	All Dogs Go to Heaven 2	Charlie B. Barkin	
1996	Aladdin and the King of Thieves	The Genie	
1997	Babes in Toyland	Gonzargo / Goblin King / Santa Claus	
1997	Beauty and the Beast: The Enchanted Christmas	Forte	
1997	Anastasia	Rasputin/Vladimir (singing voice)	
1998	Mulan	Shan Yu	
1998	Batman & Mr. Freeze: Subzero	Batman (Bruce Wayne)	
1999	The King and I	The King of Siam	
1999	Bartok the Magnificent	Zozi	
1999	Toy Story 2	Buzz Lightyear	
1999	Fantasia 2000	Penn Jillette	
2000	The Road to El Dorado	Cortés	
2000	Dinosaur	Kron	
2000	Buzz Lightyear of Star Command: The Adventure Begins	Buzz Lightyear	
2001	Monsters, Inc.	Henry J. Waternoose	
2003	The Jungle Book 2	Baloo	
2003	Finding Nemo	Bruce	
	Sinbad: Legend of the Seven Seas	Chum	
2004	The Magnifying Word	Zeus	
2005	Valiant	Von Talon	
2006	The Wild	Kazar	
2006	Cars	Buzz Lightyear Car	
2006	Barnyard: The Original Party Animals	Miles the Mule	
2007	The Simpsons Movie	Russ Cargill	
2008	Horton Hears a Who	Morton	
2009	The Princess and the Frog	Louis	
2010	Toy Story 3	Buzz Lightyear	
2010	Alpha and Omega	Winston	
2015	The Good Dinosaur	Butch	
2016	Storks	Hunter	
2019	Toy Story 4	Buzz Lightyear	

Television
Year	Title	Role	Notes
1992–1995	Batman: The Animated Series	Batman (Bruce Wayne)	
1994–1995	Aladdin	The Genie	
1997–1999	The New Batman Adventures	Batman (Bruce Wayne)	
2000–2001	Buzz Lightyear of Star Command	Buzz Lightyear	
2002–2004	Funky Cops	Capt. Dobbs	
2008	Wakfu	Kabrok / Corbeau Noir	Episode: "Le Corbeau Noir"

=== Video games ===
Video games
Year	Title	Role	Notes
2002	Kingdom Hearts	The Genie, Oogie Boogie	
2006	Kingdom Hearts II	Shan Yu, Oogie Boogie, The Genie	
2013	Kingdom Hearts Re: Chain of Memories	Oogie Boogie	
