= Léo-Ernest Ouimet =

Canadian film pioneer

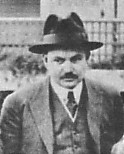
- Léo-Ernest Ouimet in 1910
- Born: March 16, 1877; Saint-Martin, Laval, Quebec, Canada
- Died: March 2, 1972 (aged 94); Montreal, Canada
- Occupations: Theater operator, filmmaker, producer, and distributor

Léo-Ernest Ouimet (March 16, 1877 – March 2, 1972) was a Canadian film pioneer. He was a theater operator, filmmaker, producer, and distributor.

== Early life ==
Léo-Ernest Ouimet was born in St. Martin, Quebec, on 16 March 1877. He dropped out of school at age twelve and worked on his family's farm from 1889 to 1894, when he moved to Montreal. He was a plumber's apprentice before becoming an electrician.

== Career ==
Ouimet, who was working as an electrician, attended an event organized by Louis Minier and Louis Pupier using a cinematograph in Saint-Laurent, Quebec, on 27 June 1896. It was the first time a film was shown in Canada and Ouimet's testimony about the event would be the main evidence for its existence until Germain Lacasse proved its existence in 1984. He worked as a lighting designer at the Théâtre National Français in 1901, and a projectionist at Sohmer Park around 1903 to 1904.

Ouimet gained the Canadian franchise rights for Kinetographe Company in 1904. He opened the Ouimetoscope on 1 January 1906. Georges Gauvreau, who owned the Theatre National before selling it and retiring, attempted to reenter the film industry by buying the Ouimetoscope. Ouimet stopped him after purchasing the property for $150,000 with $70,000 being for the property itself, $30,000 for the hotel licence, and $50,000 for design and construction. He opened a second theatre on August 31, 1907, with 1,200 seats. His theatre was initially successful, but was financially strained by lower-cost theatres around it. He rented the theatre out in 1915, and went out of business in 1926.

Ouimet established one of the first Canadian film exchanges in May 1906, with its first branch office being in St. John, New Brunswick. He started creating films in 1908. Ouimet's first films focused on his children and recording life. He sold Quebec: The Tercentenary Celebration (1908) to Charles Urban and The Eucharist Congress in Montreal (1910) to Butcher's Film Service. He was unable to produce films from 1912 to 1915, due to an illness. He reentered the industry and formed the Specialty Film Import in 1915, and became Pathé's representative in North America. He distributed serials starring Ruth Roland and Pearl White. He formed British Canadian Pathé News in 1918.

Ouimet sold Specialty Film Import to Nathan Nathanson's Regal Films for $200,000 in May 1922, and moved to produce films in California. Why Get Married? was his first film after moving and it was released in Montreal in December 1923. Its middling reviews and poor financial performance ended Ouimet's filmmaking career. He managed the Imperial Theatre for two years, but a fire killed two children ending his activity there. He gained a position on the Quebec Liquor Board and served on it until 1956.

Ouimet was inspired by S. Ivanov's work on 3D imagery without glasses. Starting in 1943, he and Albert Brault attempted to create a camera that could record separate right and left eye images on the same piece of film. They modified Pathé cameras from the 1920s and worked on the project until abandoning it in 1948.

Ouimet died in Montreal on 3 March 1972. In 2018, Ouimet was named a National Historic Person by the federal government.

== Works cited ==
- Gaudreault, André (1996). "The Introduction of the Lumière Cinematograph in Canada". Revue Canadienne d'Études Cinématographiques / Canadian Journal of Film Studies. 5 (2). SAGE Publishing: 113–123. doi:10.3138/cjfs.5.2.113. JSTOR 24402139.
- Graham, Gerald (1989). Canadian Film Technology, 1896-1986. University of Delaware Press. ISBN 0874133475.
- Clandfield, David (1987). Canadian Film. Oxford University Press. ISBN 0195405811.
- Morris, Peter, ed. (1978). Embattled Shadows: A History of Canadian Cinema 1895-1939. McGill–Queen's University Press. ISBN 9780773560727.
