= Saint-Justin, Quebec =

Saint-Justin
- Municipality
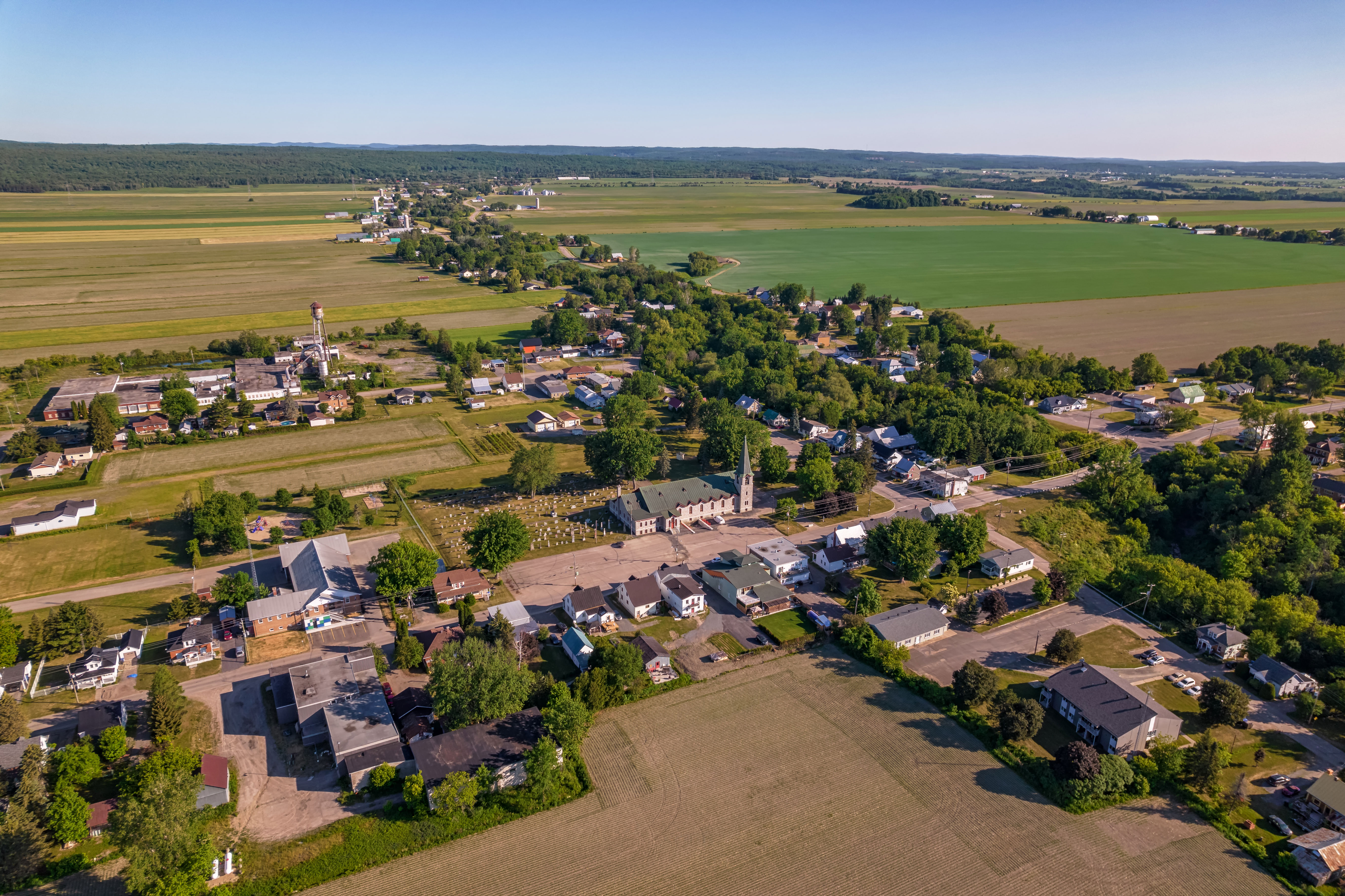
- Motto: Cruce et Aratro ("By the Cross and the Plough")
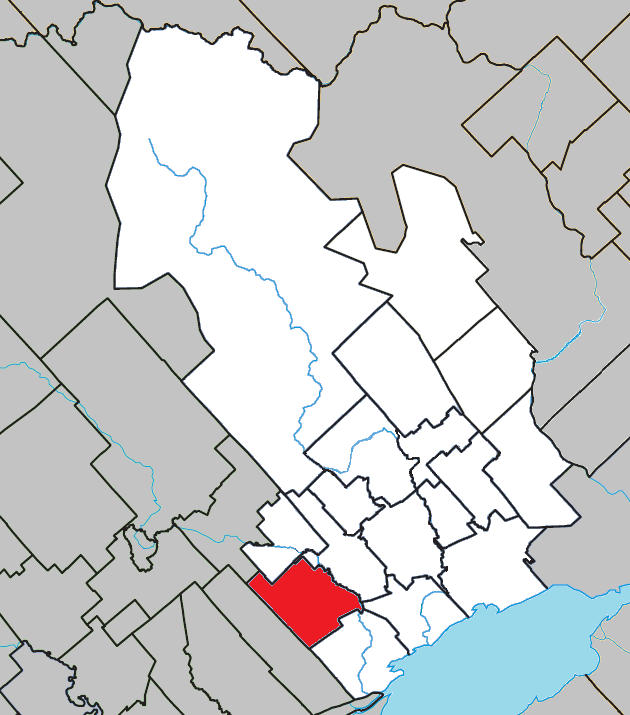
- Location within Maskinongé RCM

- Location in central Quebec
- Coordinates: 46°15′N 73°05′W
- Country: Canada
- Province: Quebec
- Region: Mauricie
- RCM: Maskinongé
- Settled: 1840s
- Constituted: 1859

Government
  - Mayor: Félix Letarte
  - Fed. riding: Berthier—Maskinongé
  - Prov. riding: Maskinongé

Area
  - Total: 79.95 km^{2} (30.87 sq mi)
  - Land: 78.96 km^{2} (30.49 sq mi)

Population (2021)
  - Total: 961
  - Density: 12.2/km^{2} (32/sq mi)
  - Change 2016-21: ▼1.2%
  - Dwellings: 511
- Time zone: UTC−5 (EST)
  - Summer (DST): UTC−4 (EDT)
- Postal code(s): J0K 2V0
- Area code(s): 819
- Highways: No major routes
- Website: www.saint-justin.ca

Saint-Justin (French pronunciation: [sɛ̃ ʒystɛ̃]) is a municipality in the Mauricie region of the province of Quebec in Canada.

== History ==
The area was originally part of the seignory of Carufel, and was opened to settlement around 1720. But little development took place. It was not until 1848 that the Parish of Saint-Justin was formed, named in honour of Justin Martyr. On March 8, 1859, the Parish Municipality of Saint-Justin was created out of territory ceded by the Municipality of Maskinongé. That same year, its post office opened.

On December 6, 2014, Saint-Justin changed from parish municipality to a (regular) municipality.

== Demographics ==
Historical census populations – Saint-Justin, Quebec

Year	Pop.	±%
1871	1,578	—
1881	1,954	+23.8%
1891	1,677	−14.2%
1901	1,619	−3.5%
1911	1,435	−11.4%
1921	1,393	−2.9%
1931	1,442	+3.5%
1941	1,539	+6.7%

Year	Pop.	±%
1951	1,465	−4.8%
1956	1,624	+10.9%
1961	1,596	−1.7%
1966	1,549	−2.9%
1971	1,444	−6.8%
1976	1,307	−9.5%
1981	1,248	−4.5%
1986	1,209	−3.1%

Year	Pop.	±%
1991	1,151	−4.8%
1996	1,152	+0.1%
2001	1,086	−5.7%
2006	1,051	−3.2%
2011	1,060	+0.9%
2016	973	−8.2%
2021	961	−1.2%

Source: Statistics Canada
