= Hôpital Maisonneuve-Rosemont =

Hospital in Montreal, Quebec, Canada

- CIUSSS de l'Est-de-L’Île-de-Montréal
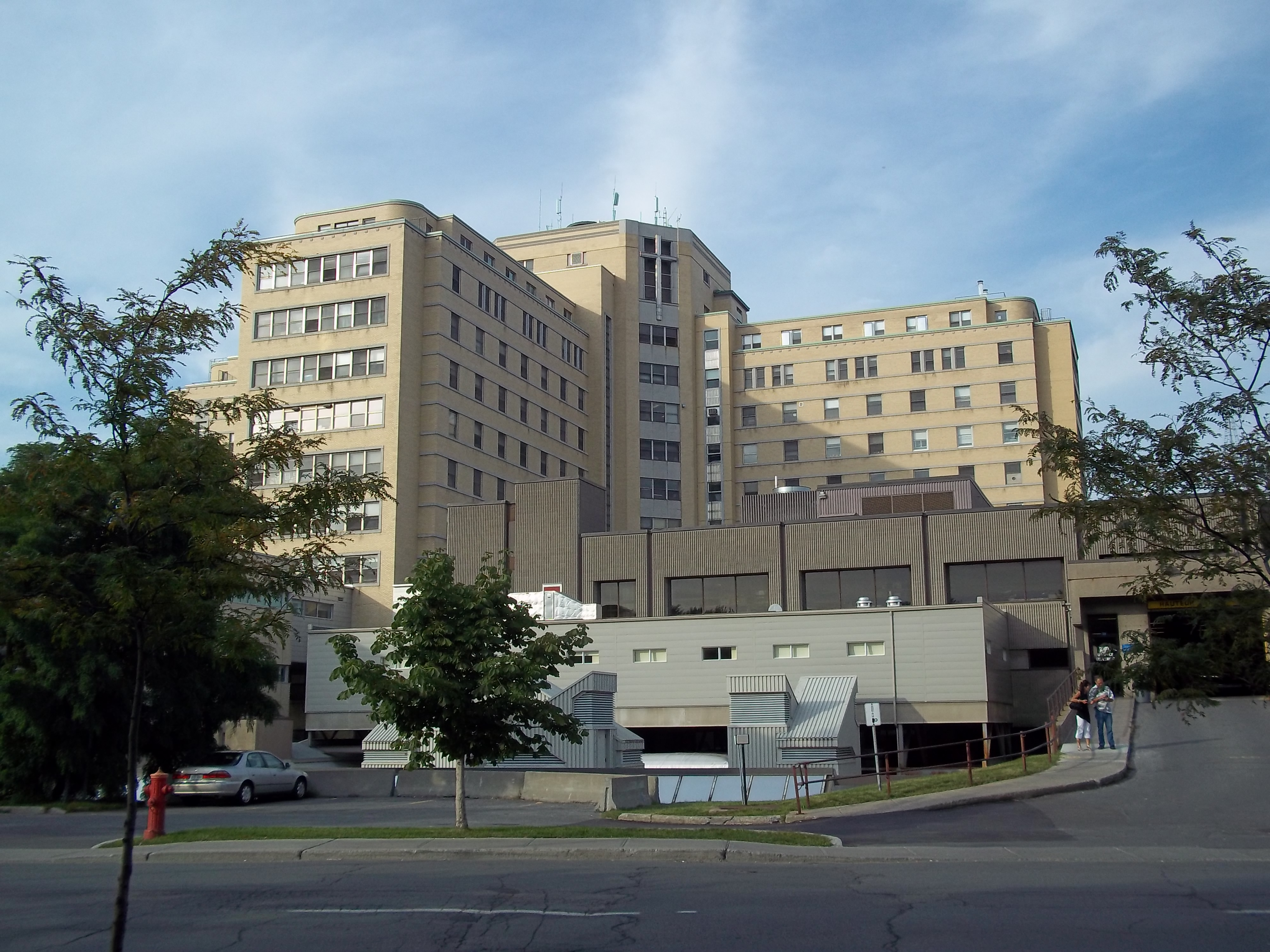

- Location in Montreal

Geography
- Location: 5415, boulevard de l'Assomption; Montreal, Quebec, Canada; H1T 2M4
- Coordinates: 45.573889°N 73.558333°W

Organisation
- Care system: RAMQ (Quebec medicare)
- Type: Teaching
- Affiliated university: Université de Montréal Faculty of Medicine

Services
- Beds: 800

History
- Founded: 1971

Links
- Website: Hôpital Maisonneuve-Rosemont

Hôpital Maisonneuve-Rosemont is a hospital in Montreal, Quebec, Canada, located in the boroughs of Rosemont–La Petite-Patrie and Mercier-Hochelaga-Maisonneuve. It serves the eastern part of the city and offers 800 beds. It employs 5,000 people and 3,000 students annually.

== History ==
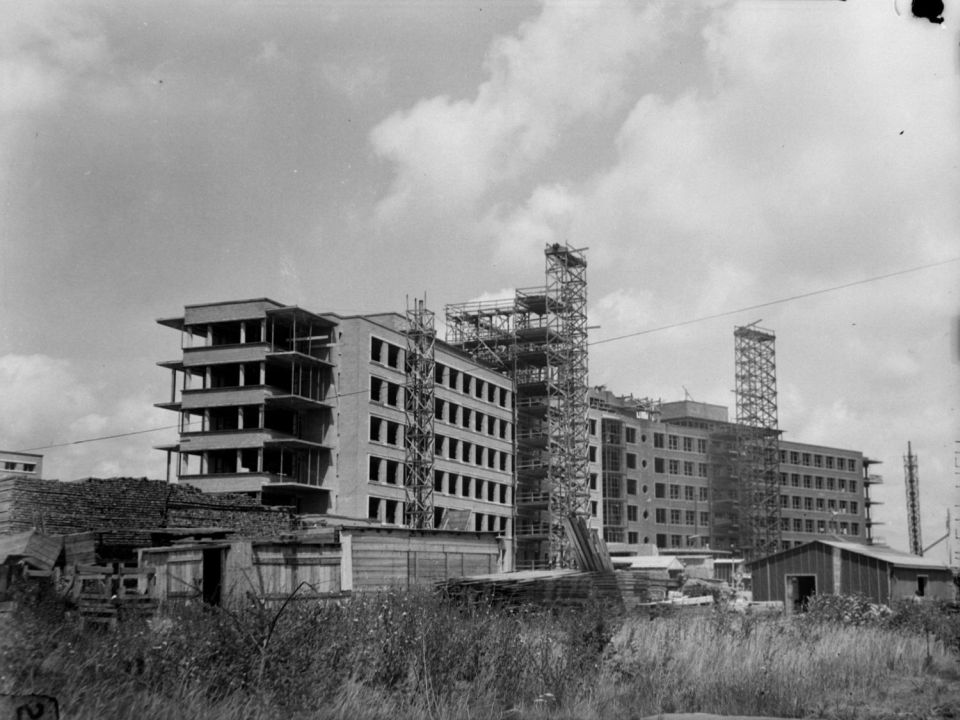
Construction of the Sanatorium Saint-Joseph (now pavillon Rosemont of the hôpital Maisonneuve-Rosemont) located on boulevard Rosemont in Montréal

Hôpital Maisonneuve-Rosemont was founded in 1971 as a result of a merger of two previous hospitals: Hôpital Maisonneuve and Hôpital Saint-Joseph de Rosemont.

Hôpital Maisonneuve was founded by the Grey Nuns in 1954 and housed a nursing school and the Montreal Heart Institute. Hôpital Saint-Joseph de Rosemont was built in 1948 and was founded in 1950 by the Misericordia Sisters. It specialized in treating tuberculosis.

== Specialization ==
Hôpital Maisonneuve-Rosemont offers general medical care, but it is known for specializing in a few particular areas: ophthalmology, stem cell treatments of various cancers, and nephrology.

== Bibliography ==
- Denis Goulet, L'hôpital Maisonneuve-Rosemont, une histoire médicale, 1954-2004, Septentrion, 2004.
