= Ouimetoscope =

Early movie theatre in Montreal, Canada

Coordinates: 45°31′6″N 73°33′22″W

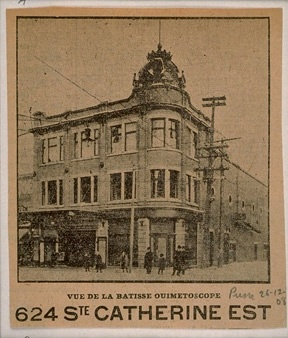
Photograph of the Ouimetoscope as it existed in 1908. The civic number of the building has now been changed to 1204 Sainte-Catherine Est.

The Ouimetoscope was the first Canadian theatre dedicated exclusively to showing movies. It was inaugurated on 1 January 1906 at the corner of Saint Catherine and Montcalm Streets in Montreal, Quebec. Originally a converted cabaret with 500 seats and a small screen, it was demolished to be replaced with a luxurious 1,200 seat movie palace that featured air conditioning.

For eighteen years, the Ouimetoscope was the venue for French and American cinema supplemented with local production, accompanied by live musicians.

== History ==
Encouraged by his 1904 success at showing moving pictures with a projector of his devising, Electrical engineer Léo-Ernest Ouimet invested his life savings of $75 into converting an ailing cabaret theatre in Montreal's downtown into the first theatre dedicated to showing moving pictures of Canada, the Ouimetoscope. Despite the small screen, the theatre was an instant success, keeping its 500 seats filled at every showing.

One year later, he reinvested his profits to construct a 1,200 seat amphitheatre with plush seating and air conditioning, a rarity at the time, making it one of the first movie palaces. Despite the large investment and the luxurious venue, admission ranging from ten to thirty cents allowed even the working-class man and woman to attend (in separated seating sections).

Showing local productions, including his own, news movies, French and translated American movies, the theatre would remain open for eighteen years until, in 1922, Ouimet's financial difficulties forced him to sell the Ouimetoscope, which closed two years later.

== Revival ==
In 1967, the theatre Le Canadien that occupied the same location would again take the name Ouimetoscope and show repertory cinema until 1992 when it was abandoned. A plaque honoring Léo-Ernest Ouimet and his theatre is all that remains.
